= Bugline Trail =

Trail in Waukesha County, Wisconsin, USA

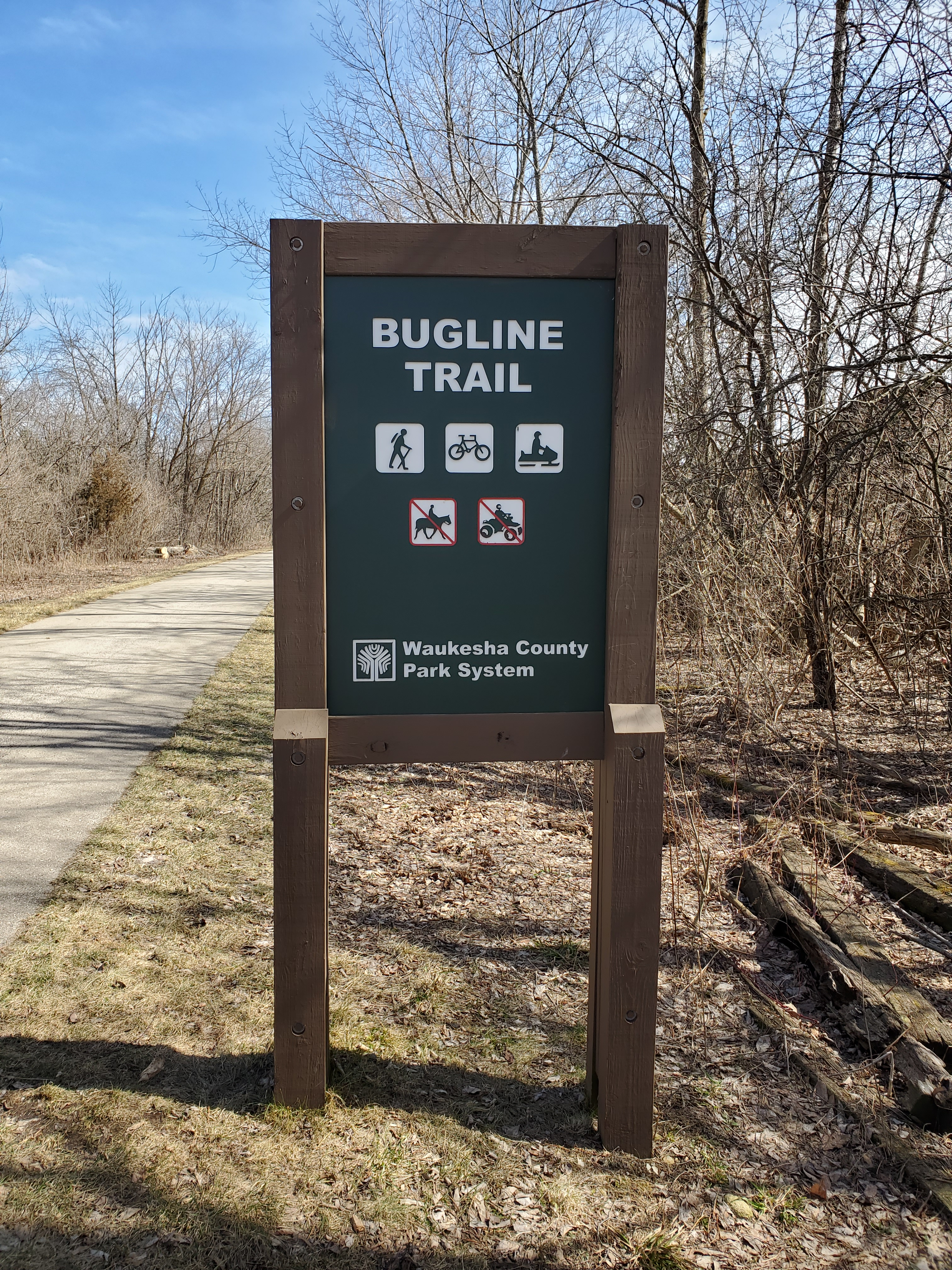
- The trailhead in North Lake
- Length: 15.6 mi (25.1 km)
- Location: Waukesha County, Wisconsin, United States
- Established: 1983
- Trailheads: Menomonee Falls 43°11′2.1235″N 88°6′48.6544″W; North Lake43°9′36.2102″N 88°21′56.9059″W
- Use: Hiking and biking
- Surface: Asphalt

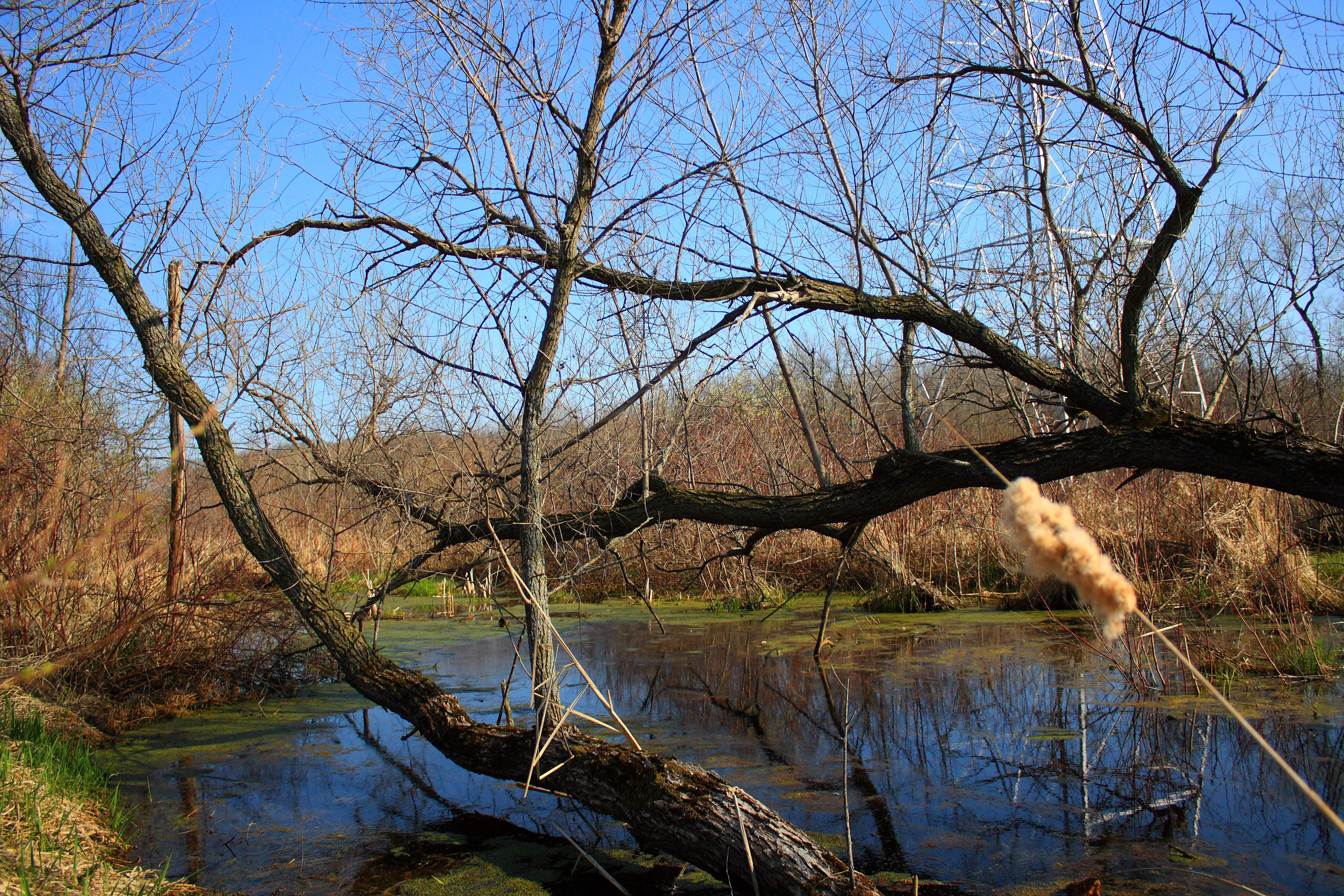
A pond off of the Bugline Trail

The Bugline Trail is a paved 15.6-mile (25.1 km) rail trail located on the former Milwaukee Road right-of-way in Waukesha County, Wisconsin.

The trail stretches between Appleton Avenue (Highway 175) in Menomonee Falls to just east of North Lake in Merton. A separate 4-foot wide bridle trail adjacent to the original 8-foot wide recreation trail extends 2.5 miles (4.0 km) from The Ranch in Menomonee Falls to Menomonee Park where it joins the park bridle trails.

== History ==
The railroad formerly occupying the trail area was constructed in 1890 by the Milwaukee, Menomonee Falls, and Western Railroad, later acquired by the Milwaukee Road. It hosted passenger service, and freight service for quarries, feed mills, creameries, and a cannery. Passengers compared the route as similar to that of "a bug following a grapevine"; later, locals referred to it simply as the Bugline. Service ceased in 1978.

The right-of-way for the trail was acquired in 1979. The trail itself opened in 1983, with an initial length of 10.5 miles (16.9 km) from Appleton Avenue in Menomonee Falls to Oakwood Road in Lisbon. In 1987, the county purchased land to extend the trail 1.65 miles (2.66 km) into the village of Merton. In 2013, a section of the trail in Sussex was rerouted to accommodate redevelopment of a former cannery; plans also progressed to extend the trail to North Lake.

Planning work for paving the trail started in 2012; paving occurred in a segmented fashion between 2013 and 2016.

== See also ==
- Lake Country Trail
