= Arrowhead High School =

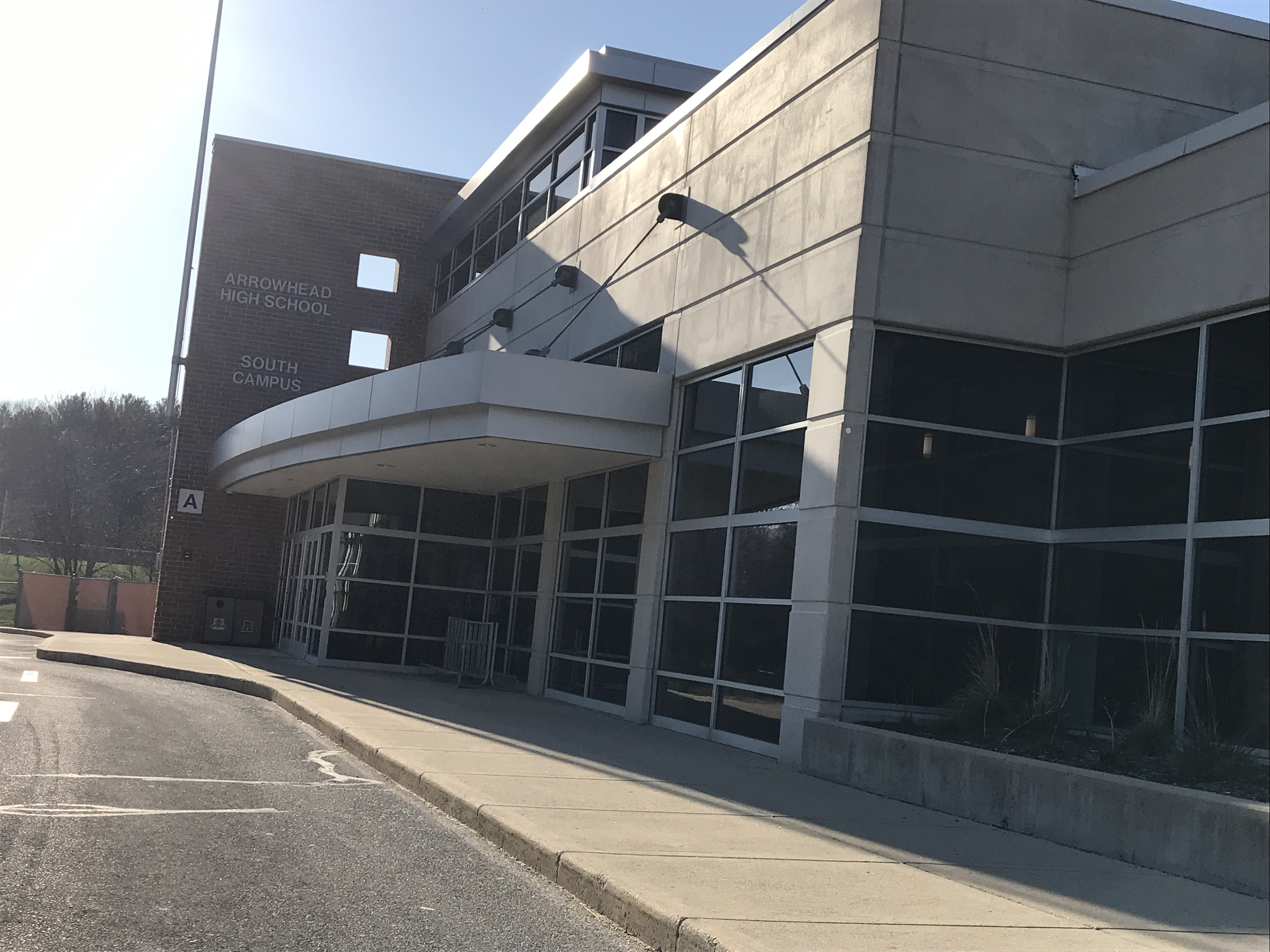

Location
- 700 North Avenue; Hartland, Wisconsin 53029; United States; 43.117640°N 88.347612°W

Information
- Type: Public high school
- Motto: "As One"
- Established: 1956
- School district: Arrowhead School District
- Principal: Adam Kurth
- Teaching staff: 113.71 (on an FTE basis)
- Grades: 9–12
- Enrollment: 2,038 (2023–2024)
- Student to teacher ratio: 17.92
- Campus: Suburban
- Colors: Red, Columbia blue, and white
- Mascot: Wally the Warhawk
- Rival: Oconomowoc High School Muskego High School
- Website: www.arrowheadschools.org

Arrowhead High School is a high school located in Merton Town, Wisconsin (with a Hartland, Wisconsin post address). Sitting on 117 acres (0.47 km^{2}) of land, the school has two campuses, a north campus and a south campus. Juniors and seniors attend the north campus, while freshmen and sophomores attend the south campus.

Enrollment is about 2300 students at the school, which employs about 200 faculty members.

Arrowhead's athletics teams are known as the Warhawks, and its mascot, Wally, is a hawk.

== History ==
Arrowhead High School was established in 1956 in the Hartland, Wisconsin area. The original high school is today known as South Campus. North Campus was added later following increased enrollment.

Laura Myrah is the superintendent. In December 2022 she announced that after August 7, 2023, she will no longer be superintendent. She cited "political pressures" on K-12 schools as her reason for leaving the field.

== Academics ==
In 2022, Newsweek ranked Arrowhead 594th in the nation out of more than 27,000 public high schools in the United States.

Arrowhead offers nearly 200 academic courses. There are honors sequences in English, mathematics, social studies, science, and art, and 17 Advanced Placement courses. "Transcripted credit" agreements with Waukesha County Technical College (WCTC) allow students to earn technical school credit for high school courses in areas such as engineering, automotive mechanics, technical and architectural drafting, fashion merchandising, child care, commercial art, and computer technology. In addition, students can participate in manufacturing and health apprenticeships through WCTC.

The school is equipped with technology and laboratory facilities. The high school also serves as a community center by providing concerts, lectures, athletic facilities and events, seminars, and evening classes to residents of the Lake Country area.

== Attendance area ==
Arrowhead serves students from:

- The unincorporated areas of North Lake and a section of Okauchee Lake
- The villages of Hartland, Chenequa, Merton and Nashotah, as well as a part of Sussex
- Portions of the cities of Delafield and Pewaukee.
- All of the town of Merton, and portions of the towns of Lisbon, Delafield, and Oconomowoc.

It also includes the unincorporated areas of Monches, Colgate, and Stone Bank.

== Feeder patterns ==
Feeder districts include: Lake Country School District, Hartland-Lakeside Joint No. 3 School District, Richmond School District, Swallow School District, North Lake School District, Merton Community School District, and Stone Bank School District.

== Extracurricular activities ==
=== Broadway Bound ===
Broadway Bound was a competitive show choir that competed between 1982 and 1998. The school also hosted its own competition, the Broadway Bound Invitational.

=== Athletics ===
Arrowhead is a member of the Classic 8 Conference. In 2004, it became the first non-professional venue in Wisconsin to use FieldTurf on its football field when it was installed at Pfeiffer Memorial Stadium. In 2007, the school renovated its East Gym in the north campus to include a new wooden floor with the school's "A" logo at half court. The school has an on-campus ice rink, the Howard G. Mullett Ice Center, which was donated by the Mullett family and opened in 1998.

In 2005, Arrowhead was named the best athletic high school in the state by Sports Illustrated, which stated, "This suburban Milwaukee school is incredible in swimming and football and has won 13 state titles over the last 10 years." It was also named the best athletic high school in Wisconsin in 2006 and 2007. The school has won 25 WIAA state championships since 1993, including six in boys' swimming, six in girls' swimming, and five in football.

In the 2007–2008 season Arrowhead's girls' cross country team won its first-ever WIAA state championship by defeating Whitefish Bay. 2007 also saw the Arrowhead girls' field hockey team win its second consecutive Wisconsin State Field Hockey Association (WSFHA) championship by defeating University School of Milwaukee. The football team took home its fourth state title in the fall of 2007 with a win over Homestead. The boys' swimming team took the state title that same year, its fourth in seven years. They had been runners-up to Madison Memorial in the previous three years. In Spring 2008 the Arrowhead boys' golf team won the Division 1 state team championship by defeating Madison Memorial. The gymnastics team took 2nd place in its third state appearance.

In the 2008–2009 school year the football team advanced to its third consecutive Division 1 state championship game against Homestead (its 9th in 16 years) and the girls' swimming team took home its sixth Division 1 state title in seven years by edging Madison East. The girls' golf team also advanced to the state tournament, finishing with a fifth-place performance.

In the winter sports season, the boys' hockey team took home its first state championship by defeating Fond du Lac.

The 2009–2010 boys' basketball team advanced to the state tournament for the first time since 2006, beating defending state champion Madison Memorial for the state championship. It was the first time Arrowhead had made it to the state finals and the school's first state basketball title. Coaching the Warhawks is Craig Haase. Before Haase the coach was Andrew Cerroni, who was named coach of Hamilton (Sussex) despite continually losing at Arrowhead at record paces.

Arrowhead's girls' gymnastics team won its first state championship, after having been runner-up the previous year. The boys' track and field team took home its third state championship, defeating Menomonee Falls. On the same day, the boys' golf team won the state championship. Arrowhead took home six state championships in the 2008–2009 school year.

In 2004, the boys' soccer team was ranked seventh in the nation in a poll of the National Soccer Coaches Association of America (NSCAA)/Adidas. In 2008, the boys' soccer team was ranked 24th in the nation in the same poll. In 2009, the soccer team advanced to the state tournament defeating Marquette in the quarterfinals.

The boys' and girls' lacrosse teams both took state titles in 2007, and in 2006, the boys' team was state runner-up. The school offers girls' ice hockey and girls' field hockey. Arrowhead, the first public school in Wisconsin to offer field hockey, claimed state titles in 2006 and 2007. The boys' track team won the state title in 2004 for the first time since 1965. Arrowhead's boys' cross country team won the state title in 2010 and 2011.

The high school has the winningest summer baseball coach in Wisconsin high school history, Tim O'Driscoll. Through the 2009 summer season, he had compiled a 742–234 record, a .767 winning percentage. In 2006, Arrowhead's baseball team was the WIAA state runner-up after losing to Marquette. On May 25, 2007, before Arrowhead's game against Kettle Moraine, the school's baseball field was renamed O'Driscoll Field in honor of the coach. Arrowhead's summer baseball team advanced to the state tournament in 1973, 1975, 1979, 1999, 2000, 2006, and 2009, with title game appearances in 1973, 1975, 1979, 2006, and 2009. The Warhawks won the state title in 1979 by defeating West Bend East. They repeated that feat in the summer of 2009 by defeating defending 2008 champion Marquette.

In 2006 the Arrowhead Cheer & Stunt team won the WACPC (Wisconsin Association of Cheer/Pom Coaches) State Championship in the Small Co-ed Division.

==== Swimming and diving ====
The girls' team won the 2014, 2010, 2009, 2008, 2006, 2005, 2004, 2003 and 2002 WIAA Division 1 Championship and was runner-up in 2013, 2012, 2011, 2000, and 1999. Winning the championship every year for five consecutive years, from 2002 to 2006, was a state record.

The boys' team won the WIAA Division 1 Championship in 2008, 2004, 2003, 2002, 1997, and 1995 and was runner up in the years 2007, 2006, 2005.

== Arrowhead and the community ==
Arrowhead hosts teams such as the Lake Country Phoenix youth swim team and the Lake Country Cyclones semi-professional football team. The Lake Country Chiefs youth football team of the Wisconsin Youth Football League also participate in football on Pfeiffer Field at Taraska Stadium.

== Notable alumni ==
- Ben Askren, professional MMA fighter, two-time NCAA champion and 2008 U.S. Olympic freestyle wrestler
- Ben Bredeson, NFL offensive lineman
- Max Bredeson, American football player
- Alec Eberhardt, record producer and DJ, known professionally as DJ Speedsick.
- Nick Hayden, NFL defensive tackle
- Jim Herrmann, NFL defensive end
- Michael Hobert, actor and scriptwriter
- John Kaiser, NFL linebacker
- Dennis Lewis, writer
- David Merkow, professional golfer, 2006 Big Ten Conference Player of the Year
- Keegan O'Toole, folkstyle and freestyle wrestler, two-time NCAA champion and Junior World freestyle champion
- Anna Piscitello, Miss Wisconsin USA 2006
- Mike Solwold, NFL long-snapper and tight end
- Tim Hobert, TV writer & producer of Spin City, Scrubs (2001 TV series)
- Christina Schwarz, author of Drowning Ruth
