= Merton Community Schools =

School district in Wisconsin, US

Merton Community School District, or Merton Community Schools, is a school district headquartered in Merton Village, Wisconsin. It operates grades PK-8.

It has 909 students in grades PK, K-8 with a student-teacher ratio of 14 to 1. According to state test scores, 69% of students are at least proficient in math and 70% in reading.

It includes most of Merton Village as well as sections of Merton Town and Lisbon Town. It feeds into the Arrowhead High School District.

== History ==
Prior to 1969 the Merton district took the junior high school students of the Lake Five School District, which operated a two room school; as of that year there were plans to divide the Lake Five district and close its school.

In 1970 an elementary school received an addition. It had a cost of $137,000.

In 2019 the district installed solar panels.

In the period 2019 to 2022, enrollment increased by 69, due to out-of-district students enrolling and additional housing developments. 58 of those students were added beginning in 2021.

== Schools ==
- Merton Intermediate School
- Merton Primary School
  - Becca Stein served as principal until 2023, when she submitted her resignation. There were parents who were in favor of her remaining, and who argued that she was unfairly convinced to resign. There were other individuals who stated that there were issues with the leadership during her principalship. The school board did not explain the resignation.
