= Swallow School District =

School district in Wisconsin, US

Swallow School District is a school district headquartered in Merton, Wisconsin (with a Hartland address). The district was established in 1844. Its sole school is Swallow School.

The district includes portions of Chenequa, Hartland, Merton Village, and Merton Town. It feeds into the Arrowhead High School District.

== History ==
In 1966 there were plans for an addition which would add four rooms.

In 1967 the district had 122 students and five full time teachers. The school had plans to increase the number of full time teachers and have a mixed classroom for the 3rd and 4th grades.

Melissa Thompson is the superintendent of the district. In 2023 she announced that she will not seek to continue being in her position even though the board of education allowed her to continue.
