= Gustaf Unonius =

Writer priest, and American Midwest pioneer (1810–1902)

Gustaf Elias Marius Unonius
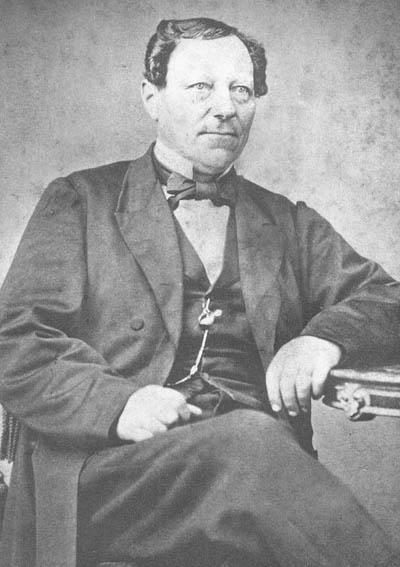
- Born: 25 August 1810; Helsinki, Finland
- Died: 14 October 1902 (aged 92); Sweden
- Other names: Gustav Unonius Gustave Unonius; Gustavus Unonius Gustov Unonius
- Education: Uppsala University; Nashotah House
- Church: Episcopal Church in the United States of America
- Ordained: 1845
- Congregations served: St. James' Episcopal Church, Manitowoc; St. Ansgarius Episcopal Church, Chicago

Gustaf Elias Marius Unonius also referred to as Gustav Unonius, Gustave Unonius, Gustavus Unonius, or Gustov Unonius (25 August 1810 – 14 October 1902) was a pioneer and priest in the American Midwest. Unonius served as a catalyst for early Scandinavian emigration to the Upper Midwest.

== Background ==
Unonius was born of Swedish parents in Helsinki (Swedish: Helsingfors) in the Grand Duchy of Finland, then part of the Russian Empire. His family moved to Sweden when he was a child. In 1830, he graduated from Uppsala University in Sweden and from the Uppsala law department in 1833. In 1841 Unonius emigrated to the United States, settling in Waukesha County, Wisconsin on a lake now called Pine Lake in the village of Chenequa, Wisconsin.

== Nya Uppsala ==
Unonius was founder of the early Swedish-American immigrant settlement known as the Pine Lake Settlement or New Upsala, (Swedish: Nya Uppsala). The settlement was near what is now the town of Merton, Wisconsin. Unonius' letters to Swedish, Danish and Finnish newspapers about pioneer life in America sparked a wave of immigration by Scandinavians to the Midwest. While living in Waukesha County, Unonius befriended James Lloyd Breck, one of the founders of the Episcopal seminary Nashotah House.

== Priesthood ==
In 1845, Gustaf Unonius became the first graduate of Nashotah House and was ordained to the Diaconate by Bishop Jackson Kemper. He was later ordained as a priest in The Episcopal Church, continuing to commute from the Pine Lake Settlement for several years. In 1848, Unonius moved to Manitowoc, Wisconsin and became the first Rector of St. James' Episcopal Church. In 1849, he founded the Swedish Episcopal Church of St. Ansgarius in Chicago, Illinois.

== Return to Sweden ==
Unonius returned to Sweden in 1858, having lived in the United States for 17 years. The stories of his travels to the United States and the trials and tribulations of life on the frontier were the subject of his two-volume memoirs, published in 1862. A partial translation of his memoirs, A Pioneer in Northwest America 1841-1858: The Memoirs of Gustaf Unonius, was published in 1960 for the Swedish Pioneer Historical Society by the University of Minnesota Press.

== Selected works ==
- Haandbog for den Hell. allmindelige Kirkes Bekjendere (1846)
- Reply to A Letter of Bp. Chase to the Members of the PEC (1851)
- Minnen från en sjuttonårig vistelse i Nordvestra Amerika (1862) Volume one Volume two
- Mormonismen: Dess Uprinnelse, Utveckling Och Bekännelse (1883)
- Bihang till Minnen från en sjuttonårig vistelse i Nordvestra Amerika (1896)
