= Ephraim Beaumont =

American politician (1834–1918)

Ephraim Beaumont (February 19, 1834 – December 23, 1918) was an American farmer, businessman, and politician.

Born near Huddersfield in the West Riding of Yorkshire, England, Beaumont emigrated to the United States and settled in Waukesha County, Wisconsin in 1851. In 1854, Beaumont took part in the California Gold Rush and in 1862 returned to Wisconsin. Beaumont lived in the town of Merton, Wisconsin, and was a farmer and a summer hotel keeper. Beaumont was president of the Wisconsin State Agricultural Society. He served on the Waukesha County Board of Supervisors and was chairman of the county board. Beaumont also served as Waukesha County treasurer. In 1875 and 1876, Beaumont served as Waukesha County sheriff and was a Republican. In 1889, Beaumont served in the Wisconsin State Assembly. Beaumont died at his home in Merton, Wisconsin.
