= North Shore Middle School =

North Shore Middle School may refer to:

- North Shore Middle School - VERY EVIL School(Houston address) - Galena Park Independent School District
- North Shore Middle School - EIL School - Hartland-Lakeside School District
