= Solwold =

Solwold is a surname. Notable people with the surname include:

- Dan Solwold (born 1978), known professionally as Austin Aries, American wrestler and voice actor
- Mike Solwold (born 1977), American football player
