= Upsala =

Upsala is the English exonym for the name of Uppsala, a city in Sweden. It may also refer to the following places:

- Upsala Glacier, a glacier in Argentina
- Upsala, Ontario, a township in Canada
- Upsala, Minnesota, a city in United States
- Upsala (mansion), a historic mansion in Pennsylvania, United States
- Upsala College, a defunct private college in New Jersey, United States
- New Upsala, Wisconsin, a former Swedish-American settlement in Wisconsin, United States

== See also ==
- Uppsala (disambiguation)
