= Oconomowoc (town), Wisconsin =

Oconomowoc, Wisconsin
- Town
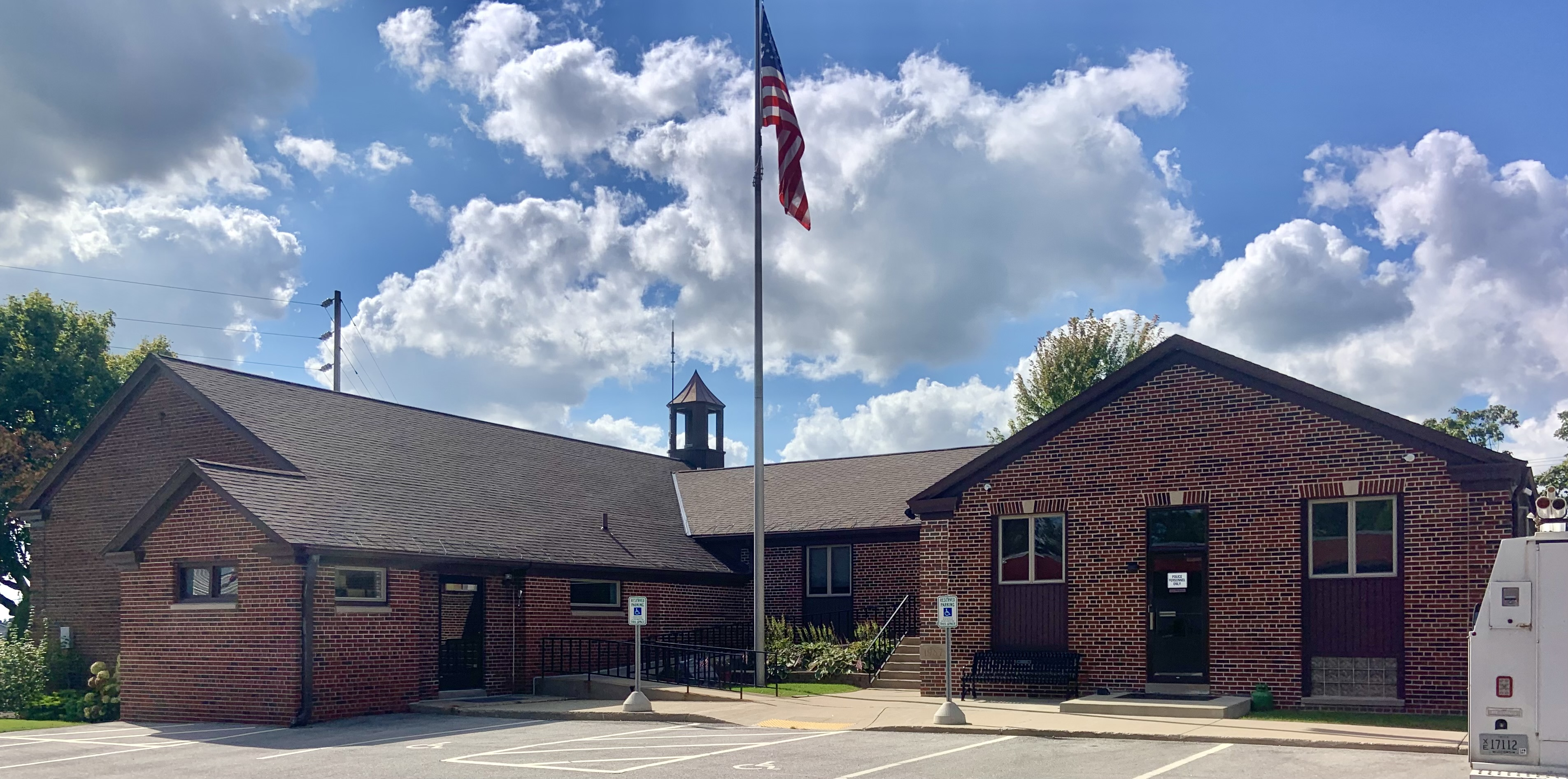
- Oconomowoc Town Hall

- Location in Waukesha County and the state of Wisconsin.
- Coordinates: 43°7′28″N 88°28′17″W
- Country: United States
- State: Wisconsin
- County: Waukesha

Government
  - Type: Town Board (Chairman – Supervisors)
  - Chairman: Robert Hultquist

Area
  - Total: 32.6 sq mi (84.4 km^{2})
  - Land: 29.3 sq mi (75.9 km^{2})
  - Water: 3.3 sq mi (8.6 km^{2})
- Elevation: 869 ft (265 m)

Population (2020)
  - Total: 8,836
  - Density: 254/sq mi (98.2/km^{2})
- Time zone: UTC-6 (Central (CST))
  - Summer (DST): UTC-5 (CDT)
- Area code: 262
- FIPS code: 55-59275
- GNIS feature ID: 1583848
- Website: www.service-life.com/wi/townoconomowoc/

Oconomowoc is a town in Waukesha County, Wisconsin, United States. The population was 8,836 at the 2020 census. The City of Oconomowoc and the Villages of Chenequa and Lac La Belle are located partially in the town. The unincorporated communities of Mapleton, Monterey, and Okauchee Lake, are located in the town. The unincorporated community of Stone Bank is located partially in the town. In January 2025, most of the town was annexed into the Village of Lac La Belle, however, a small portion of the town was not annexed by the Village of Lac La Belle.

== Geography ==
According to the United States Census Bureau, the town has a total area of 32.6 square miles (84.4 km^{2}), of which 29.3 square miles (75.9 km^{2}) is land and 3.3 square miles (8.6 km^{2}) (10.18%) is water.

== Demographics ==
Historical population
Census	Pop.	Note	%±
1980	7,340		—
1990	7,323		−0.2%
2000	7,451		1.7%
2010	8,408		12.8%
2020	8,836		5.1%

As of the census of 2000, there were 7,451 people, 2,765 households, and 2,140 families residing in the town. The population density was 254.4 people per square mile (98.2/km^{2}). There were 3,045 housing units at an average density of 104.0 per square mile (40.1/km^{2}). The racial makeup of the town was 98.74% White, 0.13% Black or African American, 0.13% Native American, 0.20% Asian, 0.01% Pacific Islander, 0.19% from other races, and 0.59% from two or more races. 0.52% of the population were Hispanic or Latino of any race.

There were 2,765 households, out of which 34.5% had children under the age of 18 living with them, 70.1% were married couples living together, 4.3% had a female householder with no husband present, and 22.6% were non-families. 17.3% of all households were made up of individuals, and 5.8% had someone living alone who was 65 years of age or older. The average household size was 2.69 and the average family size was 3.07.

In the town, the population was spread out, with 25.4% under the age of 18, 6.2% from 18 to 24, 29.4% from 25 to 44, 29.2% from 45 to 64, and 9.8% who were 65 years of age or older. The median age was 40 years. For every 100 females, there were 103.7 males. For every 100 females age 18 and over, there were 104.9 males.

The median income for a household in the town was $68,676, and the median income for a family was $75,200. Males had a median income of $50,153 versus $29,921 for females. The per capita income for the town was $37,244. About 2.0% of families and 2.4% of the population were below the poverty line, including 1.6% of those under age 18 and 10.0% of those age 65 or over.

== Notable people ==
- Jonas Swenholt (1855–1923), Wisconsin State Representative, was born in the town
