= Stone Bank, Wisconsin =

Stone Bank
- Unincorporated community
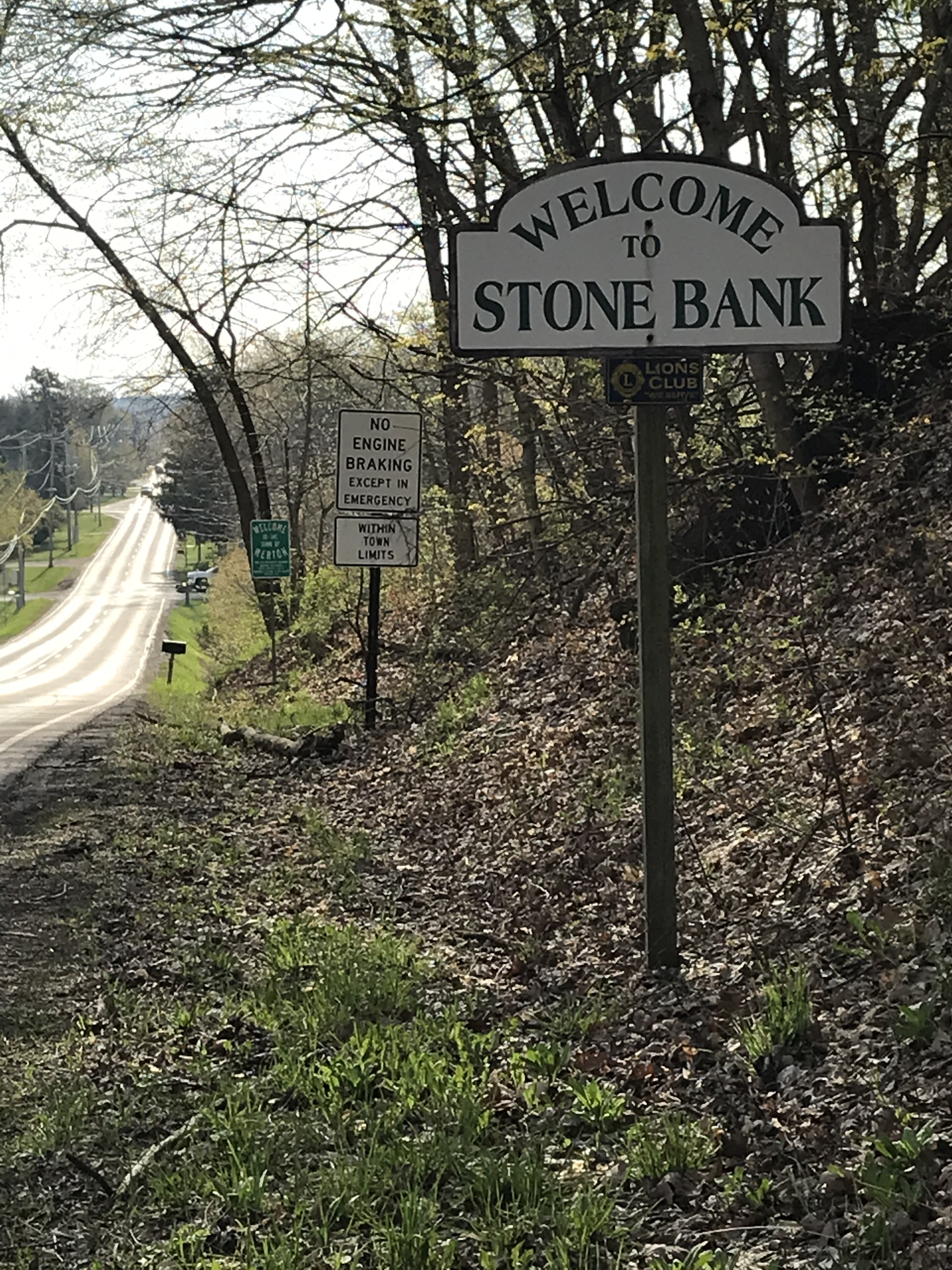

- Location within the state of Wisconsin
- Coordinates: 43°8′32″N 88°24′36″W
- Country: United States
- State: Wisconsin
- County: Waukesha
- Time zone: UTC-6 (Central (CST))
  - Summer (DST): UTC-5 (CDT)

Stone Bank (formerly Newberg) is an unincorporated community located in the towns of Merton and Oconomowoc, in Waukesha County, Wisconsin, United States.

== History ==
Stone Bank was first settled in 1842 and had grist and saw mills. In 1858, the post office opened; a blacksmith shop and grocery store also opened. Churches and a cemetery were also established.

== Community services ==
For over 100 years, the community supported and maintained the Stone Bank Fire Department which served the Towns of Oconomowoc and Merton with Fire, EMS, and Rescue services. The Stone Bank Fire Department also served portions of the Town of Ashippun with EMS services. SBFD dates back to 1907 and averaged 400 calls for service per year. Unfortunately, the fire department was overtaken by Western Lakes Fire District in 2020.

Stone Bank School offers kindergarten (K4) through 8th grade and is a part of the Arrowhead Union School District. The son of renowned local architect Alexander C. Eschweiler, Carl Eschweiler, has his diploma hanging in the front office of Stone Bank School.

== Geography ==
Stone Bank is situated about 4.5 miles northeast of the city of Oconomowoc along Waukesha County Highways K and C. It is on the north shore of Okauchee Lake and also has extensive shorelines with Moose Lake.

The surface geology of the Oconomowoc region as a whole is glacial, part of the Kettle Moraine region of Southeastern Wisconsin. Okauchee and Moose lakes are both kettle lakes as are all nearby lakes.

The soil is, therefore, very rich with clays and organics, suitable for farming. Much of the farming done in Stone Bank is corn, or alfalfa. Because of the urban encroachment from Milwaukee, much of this farmland is being subdivided for neighborhoods.

One prominent feature in the area is the large ridge between Moose Lake and Okauchee Lake. County Highway C runs along this ridge between Nashotah and its termination at the Stone Bank Market. Downtown is bordered on the East side by this formation and on the west side by another hill that runs just west of Breezy Point Road. This hill terminates at Breezy Point, a small point in Okauchee Lake. At the base of the east hill lies the Oconomowoc River, a stream that runs through North Lake and meets Okauchee Lake in a small marsh between the east hill and Lakeview Drive.

== Landmarks ==
- Stone Bank Community Park

== Events ==
There are many festivals and events held at the Stone Bank Community Park. In addition, the Stone Bank Fire Department typically holds an annual Pancake Breakfast and Open House in May.
