= St. James' Episcopal Church (Manitowoc, Wisconsin) =

Church in Wisconsin, United States of America

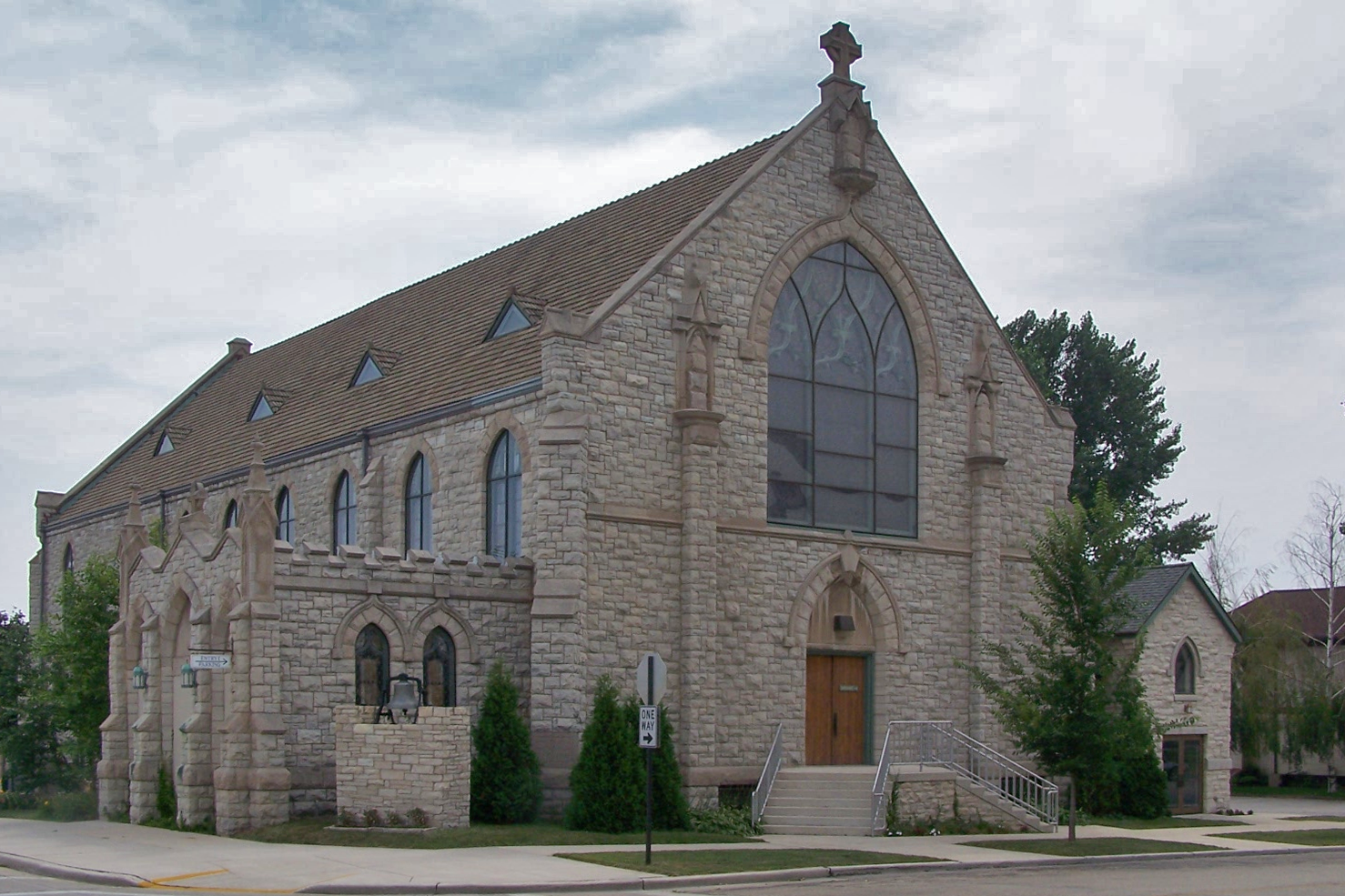
- View of St. James' church building from northeast

Religion
- Affiliation: Episcopal, Anglican
- District: Diocese of Fond du Lac
- Province: Province V
- Ecclesiastical or organizational status: Parish church
- Year consecrated: 1902 (current building)

Location
- Location: Manitowoc, Wisconsin, United States
- Interactive map of St. James' Episcopal Church
- Coordinates: 44.0969°N 87.658°W

Architecture
- Type: Church
- Style: Gothic Revival
- Completed: 1902 (current building)
- Construction cost: $35,000

Specifications
- Direction of façade: north
- Height (max): 48 feet (interior)
- Materials: dolomitic limestone Bedford limestone

Website
- St. James' Episcopal Church

St. James' Episcopal Church, named for James the Greater, is a historic Episcopal church located in Manitowoc, Wisconsin. The only Episcopal church in Manitowoc County, St. James' identifies a "broad church" parish in the Episcopal Diocese of Wisconsin. It is the oldest continually operating congregation in Manitowoc County, first meeting in 1841. and organizing in 1848. The current church building, an example of Gothic Revival architecture, was consecrated in 1902. The congregation is active in community service and social justice ministries. It was formerly in the jurisdiction of the Episcopal Diocese of Fond du Lac.

In 2017, the church reported 113 members; in 2023, it reported 72 members. No membership statistics were reported in 2024 national parochial reports. Average Sunday Attendance ASA reported in 2024 was 28 persons. This was a relative decrease on ASA of 58 in 2018. Plate and pledge financial support reported by the church in 2024 was $85,767.

== History ==
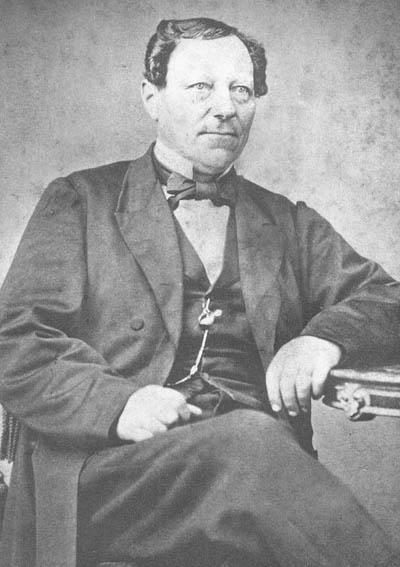
First rector Gustaf Unonius

Richard Cadel, a missionary to the Oneida nation, made his first trip to Manitowoc County, and held the first Protestant worship service there in Manitowoc Rapids in the late 1830s. The first documented gathering of the forming congregation was in February 1841, with about 60 congregants. On 28 February 1848, the congregation was formally organized as St. James' Mission of the Diocese of Wisconsin (which later sub-divided into the Eau Claire, Fond du Lac, and Milwaukee dioceses). The first graduate of Nashotah House seminary, The Rev. Gustaf Unonius, became the first Rector of St. James' on 20 April 1848. Initially, worship was held on the upper floor of the Unonius family home. Worship was later held at a local schoolhouse.

The first church building, designed by Philadelphia architect R.A. Gilpin, was erected at Ninth and Chicago streets in Manitowoc. It was constructed of white pine fastened with oak pegs. Bishop Jackson Kemper laid the cornerstone 24 November 1851. The church, built at a cost of $1500, was consecrated 25 July 1852 (the Feast of St. James). In 1864, St. James' was removed from the mission list and became a self-supporting parish. The church also provided Episcopal missions in Branch, Manitowoc Rapids, and Two Rivers through the remainder of the 1800s.

== Architecture and design ==
The Rev. S. R. S. Gray became Rector of St. James' in 1895, at a time when the congregation was outgrowing the original building. Construction on a new building commenced in 1901, using plans Gray had brought that were based on an Anglican church near Oxford, England. On 14 August 1901, Bishop Reginald Weller laid the cornerstone. The building was consecrated on 25 July 1902 (the Feast of St. James), fifty years after consecration of the original church building. The building cost approximately $35,000.

Altar and reredos

The exterior uses gray dolomitic limestone as the main material, with lighter Bedford limestone as trim. The interior walls of the nave and chancel are of carved Flemish oak, and the interior height is 48 feet. The altar is crafted from white Vermont marble, with four onyx supporting pillars. The reredos and tabernacle behind the altar are of carved Flemish oak, matching the surrounding walls, and rise into a set of panels containing wood burnings. A plaque designates the area in memory of first rector Gustaf Unonius, who died the same year the church was completed. The wood burning panels were created by Mrs. R.K. Paine, started in 1902 and completed in 1907.

The original church building at Ninth and Chicago streets was sold to Sacred Heart Roman Catholic Church, and razed in 1927.

== Ecumenism ==
St. James' is located on Eighth and State streets in the heart of the neighborhood locally referred to as Holy Hill (not related to Holy Hill National Shrine), immediately north of the National Register of Historic Places Eighth Street Historic District. The close proximity of historic ELCA Lutheran, Episcopal, Presbyterian, and Roman Catholic churches and the Jewish synagogue in this neighborhood has facilitated ecumenical partnership and collaboration among those congregations. A variety of community forums, joint educational opportunities, and ecumenical worship are offered by these congregations.

== Notable clergy ==
Since 1848, St. James' has been served by 39 rectors, four deacons, and a number of interim clergy, with several clergy of note in addition to those of historical significance. George W. Thompson contracted cholera, while nursing cholera patients and died in 1854. G.B. Engel (rector from 1860–1864) gave up his pastoral duties for a time to serve as a military chaplain for the 14th Wisconsin Volunteer Infantry Regiment during the American Civil War. B. Talbot Rogers was the first priest vocation from within the parish in 1855, and also served as rector in 1890. Joan Smoke became the first woman to be ordained a deacon in the Diocese of Fond du Lac in 1998.

== Worship ==
St. James' Episcopal Church is a "broad church" parish, offering a balance between the high church and low church styles of churchmanship. In worship and theology, this stresses and embraces the breadth of Episcopal doctrine and practice. The original marble altar, raised up several tiers, is used to celebrate some Eucharists, while a simpler wooden altar placed at floor level near the congregation is used for others. Worship is from the 1979 Book of Common Prayer, primarily using Rite II, written in modern language. All four Eucharistic Prayers are used throughout the year. Rite I, written in more traditional language, is used on occasion.

Music at Sunday 10:00 AM worship is a balance between traditional hymns and more contemporary songs; some weeks feature organ music and others guitar music. A spoken Morning Prayer service is offered every Friday morning at 6:30 AM in the chapel. The church also offers more specialized worship styles throughout the year, featuring Taizé-style worship, polka masses, and contemporary Christian music.

== Community service and social justice ==
St. James' has a history of ministry in community service and social justice.

- The church has provided space for local Head Start programs for 40 years.
- St. James' founded and continues to support an ecumenical community feeding program, Sunday Supper.
- The congregation was one of the founders of Project Cool for Back to School in 2004 merging with a similar venture, Operation KAN, to form KAN Cool for School in 2006. The non-profit organization gathers and distributes school supplies and clothing to students at an annual back-to-school event, and also stocks schools with supplies and winter clothing for distribution throughout the year.
- St. James' is a Habitat for Humanity "covenant congregation", providing financial and volunteer support to the organization.
- The church supports achievement of the Millennium Development Goals (MDGs), a global plan focusing on hunger, poverty, education, equality, health, and environmental issues. In 2007, St. James' held the first U2charist in Wisconsin, raising funds to support MDG causes.
- In fall 2007, St. James' formed a partnership with Madison Elementary School, developing an after-school tutoring and activity program.
