= New Upsala, Wisconsin =

Former human settlement in Waukesha County, Wisconsin, USA

- Ghost Town
- Location within Wisconsin
- Coordinates: 43°7′1.2″N 88°23′2.4″W
- Country: United States
- State: Wisconsin
- Established: 1842

New Upsala (Swedish: Nya Uppsala) also referred to as the Pine Lake Settlement, was an early pioneer Swedish-American community in Wisconsin. The short-lived settlement of Swedish immigrants was founded by Gustaf Unonius. It was located in the north central section of Waukesha County, Wisconsin, near the town of Merton, outside Delafield, in the area now incorporated as the villages of Chenequa and Nashotah.

== Founding ==
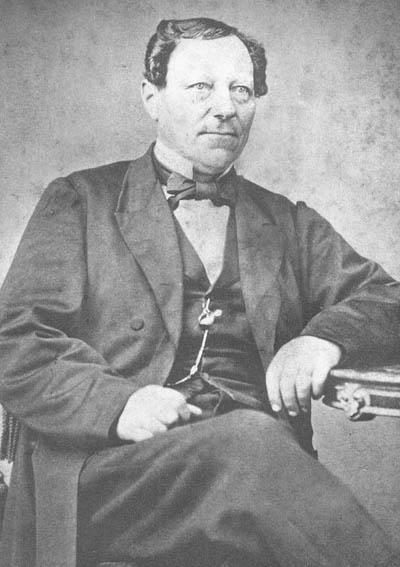
Gustaf Unonius, Founder of New Upsala
