= Uppsala (disambiguation) =

Uppsala is a city in Sweden.

Uppsala may also refer to:

- Gamla Uppsala, a village outside Uppsala city, important in Norse paganism
- Uppsala Airport (ICAO code ESCM)
- Uppsala County
- Uppsala County (Riksdag constituency)
- Uppsala Municipality
- Uppsala Synod, a 1593 ecclesiastical conference of the Lutheran Church of Sweden
- Uppsala University, a public university in Uppsala

== See also ==
- Upsala (disambiguation)
- Upsall
