= Delafield (town), Wisconsin =

Town of Delafield, Wisconsin
- Town
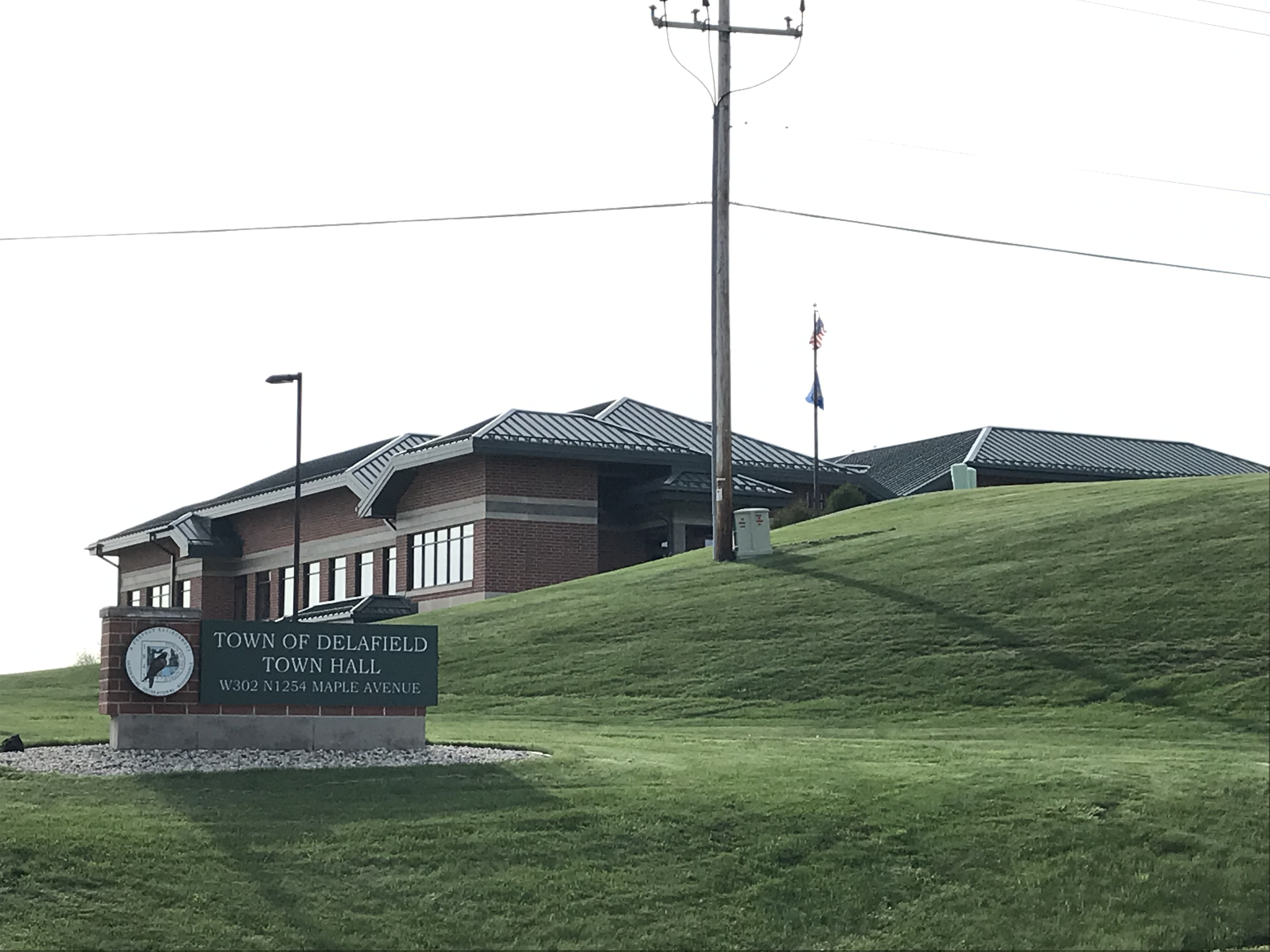
- Town hall

- Location in Waukesha County and the state of Wisconsin.
- Coordinates: 43°3′29″N 88°20′30″W
- Country: United States
- State: Wisconsin
- County: Waukesha

Area
  - Total: 20.7 sq mi (53.7 km^{2})
  - Land: 18.6 sq mi (48.3 km^{2})
  - Water: 2.1 sq mi (5.5 km^{2})
- Elevation: 981 ft (299 m)

Population (2020)
  - Total: 8,095
  - Density: 420/sq mi (162.1/km^{2})
- Time zone: UTC-6 (Central (CST))
  - Summer (DST): UTC-5 (CDT)
- Area code: 262
- FIPS code: 55-19425
- GNIS feature ID: 1583067

The Town of Delafield is located in Waukesha County, Wisconsin, United States. The population was 8,095 at the 2020 census. The City of Delafield is adjacent to the town. The unincorporated community of Buena Vista is located in the town.

== History ==
The town of Delafield was originally named "Nemahbin". The name was changed in the 4th Wisconsin Territorial Assembly in 1844.

== Geography ==
According to the United States Census Bureau, the town has a total area of 20.8 square miles (53.7 km^{2}), of which 18.6 square miles (48.3 km^{2}) is land and 2.1 square miles (5.5 km^{2}) (10.22%) is water.

== Demographics ==
Historical population
Census	Pop.	Note	%±
1980	4,597		—
1990	5,735		24.8%
2000	7,820		36.4%
2010	8,400		7.4%
2020	8,095		−3.6%

As of the census of 2000, there were 7,820 people, 2,521 households, and 2,137 families residing in the town. The population density was 419.7 people per square mile (162.1/km^{2}). There were 2,625 housing units at an average density of 140.9 per square mile (54.4/km^{2}). The racial makeup of the town was 93.94% White, 3.47% Black or African American, 0.24% Native American, 0.77% Asian, 0.50% from other races, and 1.09% from two or more races. Some 1.78% of the population were Hispanic or Latino of any race.

There were 2,521 households, out of which 42.0% had children under the age of 18 living with them, 79.5% were married couples living together, 3.8% had a female householder with no husband present, and 15.2% were non-families. About 11.2% of all households were made up of individuals, and 3.2% had someone living alone who was 65 years of age or older. The average household size was 2.93 and the average family size was 3.19.

In the town, the population was spread out, with 32.4% under the age of 18, 5.6% from 18 to 24, 24.7% from 25 to 44, 30.7% from 45 to 64, and 6.6% who were 65 years of age or older. The median age was 39 years. For every 100 females, there were 112.2 males. For every 100 females age 18 and over, there were 100.9 males.

The median income for a household in the town was $98,779, and the median income for a family was $107,486. Males had a median income of $70,136 versus $35,216 for females. The per capita income for the town was $41,391. About 1.9% of families and 3.0% of the population were below the poverty line, including 3.5% of those under age 18 and 8.1% of those age 65 or over.

== Government and infrastructure ==
The former Ethan Allen School for Boys, a Wisconsin Department of Corrections facility, was located in the town.

== Education ==
The Kettle Moraine School District serves most of Delafield Town. Kettle Moraine Middle School and Kettle Moraine High School are the zoned secondary schools of the Kettle Moraine district.

A portion of Delafield Town is zoned to Hartland-Lakeside Joint No. 3 School District, and a small portion is zoned to Lake Country School District. Both of those portions are zoned to Arrowhead Union High School District.
