= Waukesha County, Wisconsin =

County in Wisconsin, United States

Coordinates: 43.02°N 88.31°W

- County
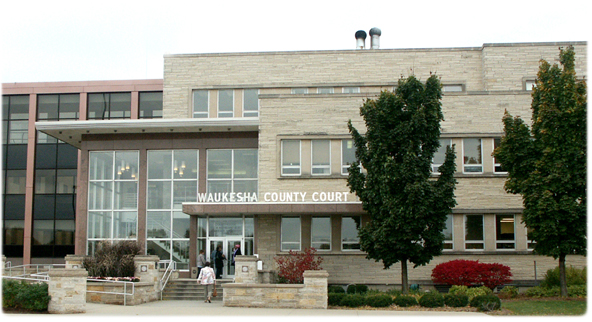
- Waukesha County Courthouse

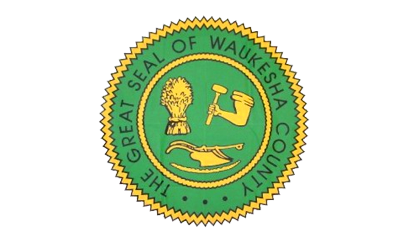
- Flag Seal
- Motto: "Leading the way!"
- Map of Wisconsin showing Waukesha County

- Wisconsin's location in the contiguous United States
- Country: United States
- State: Wisconsin
- Incorporated: 1846
- County seat: Waukesha
- Largest city: Waukesha

Area
  - Total: 581 sq mi (1,500 km^{2})
  - Land: 550 sq mi (1,400 km^{2})
  - Water: 31 sq mi (80 km^{2})

Population (2020)
  - Total: 406,978
  - Estimate (2025): 417,210 ▲
  - Rank: 3rd largest county in Wisconsin
  - Density: 740/sq mi (290/km^{2})
- Time zone: UTC−6 (Central)
  - Summer (DST): UTC−5 (Central)
- Area codes: 262, 414
- Congressional districts: 5th
- U.S. Routes: link = U.S. Route 18 in Wisconsin link = U.S. Route 41 in Wisconsin link = U.S. Route 45 in Wisconsin
- State Routes: link = Wisconsin Highway 16 link = Wisconsin Highway 36 link = Wisconsin Highway 59 link = Wisconsin Highway 67 link = Wisconsin Highway 83 link = Wisconsin Highway 100
- Airports: Waukesha County Airport Capitol Airport
- Website: www.waukeshacounty.gov

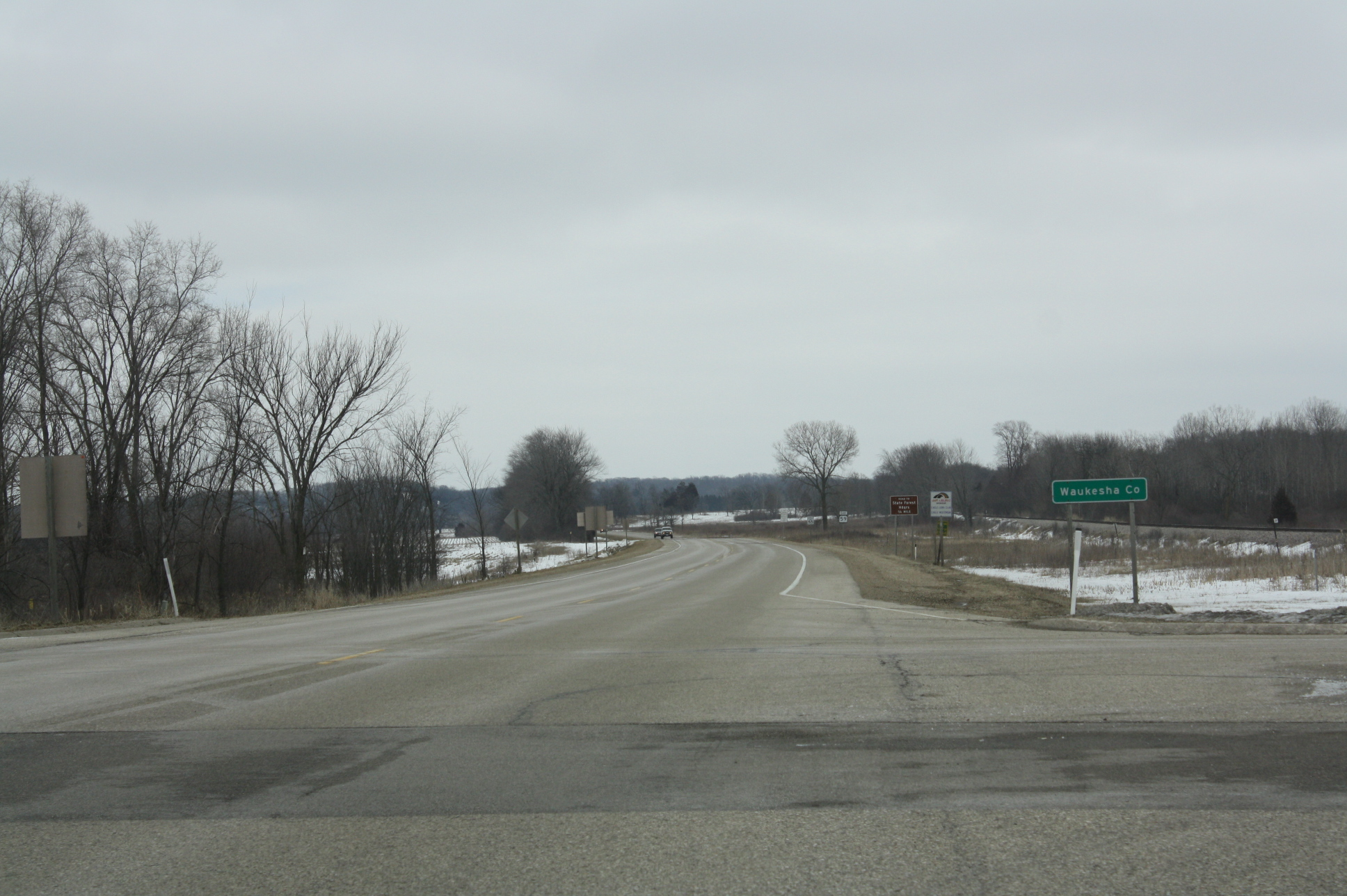
Waukesha County sign on WIS 59

Waukesha County (/ˈwɔːkɪʃɔː/) is a county in the U.S. state of Wisconsin. As of the 2020 United States Census, the population was 406,978, making it the third-most populous county in Wisconsin. Its county seat and largest city is Waukesha.

Waukesha County is included in the Milwaukee metropolitan area, and is one of the three WOW counties.

== History ==
The region was first home to Indigenous tribes like Menomonie, Ojibwe (Chippewa), Potawatomi, and Ho-Chunk (Winnebago), who practiced agriculture and trade. In 1836, Native American tribes formally lost title to the land when treaties were disregarded and were forcibly removed by the Federal Army. Prior to the 1830s, the area was unoccupied by settlers due to its inland location and the fact that the Fox River was not a water highway. The New England settlers only came to the area to set up fur trading posts between their new encampments and established cities like Milwaukee. Morris D. Cutler and Alonso Cutler, seeking claims for homesteads, were the first permanent white colonial settlers.

The part of Wisconsin that Waukesha County occupies was a part of Michigan Territory when Milwaukee County was organized in September 1834. On July 4, 1836, the Wisconsin Territory was formed, which included land that is now in the state of Minnesota. In January 1846, part of Milwaukee County was split off into Waukesha County. Curtis Reed was the first county chairman. When a vote decided the county seat, Waukesha defeated Pewaukee by two votes. The name is derived from the Potawatomi word for 'fox' because the streams in the lower part of the county drain into the Fox River.

Waukesha was a New England settlement, and Waukesha's founders were settlers from New England, particularly Connecticut, rural Massachusetts, Vermont, New Hampshire and Maine, as well as from upstate New York who were born to parents who had migrated there from New England shortly after the American Revolution. These people were "Yankees" descended from the English Puritans who settled New England in the 1600s. They were part of a wave of New England farmers who headed west into what was the wilds of the Northwest Territory during the early 1800s. Most arrived as a result of the completion of the Erie Canal as well as the end of the Black Hawk War.

The New Englanders built farms, roads, government buildings and established post routes. They brought many of their Yankee New England values, such as a passion for education that led to the establishment of many schools as well as staunch support for abolitionism. They were mostly members of the Congregationalist Church, though some were Episcopalian. Due to the second Great Awakening some converted to Methodism, and others became Baptists before moving to what is now Waukesha County. Waukesha, like much of Wisconsin, would be culturally very continuous with early New England culture for most of its early history, before the state received a substantial influx of German immigrants in the latter half of the 19th century.

Waukesha County is growing faster than the rest of Wisconsin. In the early 20th century, Waukesha County only contained about 2% of Wisconsin's population. By the year 2000, about 7% of Wisconsin's population was in Waukesha County, and the percentage has grown since.

In 2024, Waukeshaaspis, a prehistoric genus of trilobite, was named after the county.

== Geography ==
According to the U.S. Census Bureau, the county has a total area of 581 square miles (1,500 km^{2}), of which 550 square miles (1,400 km^{2}) is land and 31 square miles (80 km^{2}) (5.3%) is water. The Fox River runs through it.

Waukesha County is located to the west of Milwaukee and its suburban development was spurred by the construction of Interstate 94.

=== Lake country ===
Because of its large number of lakes, the northwestern corner of Waukesha County is referred to as "Lake Country" by local residents. The area includes Pewaukee, Delafield, Hartland, Merton, Nashotah, Chenequa, Okauchee Lake, Oconomowoc, Summit, and Lac La Belle.

=== Adjacent counties ===
- Washington County – north
- Ozaukee County – northeast
- Milwaukee County – east
- Racine County – southeast
- Walworth County – southwest
- Jefferson County – west
- Dodge County – northwest

== Demographics ==
Historical population
Census	Pop.	Note	%±
1850	19,258		—
1860	26,831		39.3%
1870	28,274		5.4%
1880	28,957		2.4%
1890	33,270		14.9%
1900	35,229		5.9%
1910	37,100		5.3%
1920	42,612		14.9%
1930	52,358		22.9%
1940	62,744		19.8%
1950	85,901		36.9%
1960	158,249		84.2%
1970	231,365		46.2%
1980	280,326		21.2%
1990	304,715		8.7%
2000	360,767		18.4%
2010	389,891		8.1%
2020	406,978		4.4%
2025 (est.)	417,210	▲	2.5%
U.S. Decennial Census; 1790–1960 1900–1990; 1990–2000 2010–2020

=== Racial and ethnic composition ===
Waukesha County, Wisconsin – Racial and ethnic composition Note: the US Census treats Hispanic/Latino as an ethnic category. This table excludes Latinos from the racial categories and assigns them to a separate category. Hispanics/Latinos may be of any race.
Race / Ethnicity (NH = Non-Hispanic)	Pop 1980	Pop 1990	Pop 2000	Pop 2010	Pop 2020	% 1980	% 1990	% 2000	% 2010	% 2020
White alone (NH)	273,248	294,855	339,905	353,114	347,922	97.48%	96.76%	94.22%	90.57%	85.49%
Black or African American alone (NH)	725	1,058	2,570	4,726	6,648	0.26%	0.35%	0.71%	1.21%	1.63%
Native American or Alaska Native alone (NH)	458	629	685	863	807	0.16%	0.21%	0.19%	0.22%	0.20%
Asian alone (NH)	1,453	2,676	5,340	10,675	15,616	0.52%	0.88%	1.48%	2.74%	3.84%
Native Hawaiian or Pacific Islander alone (NH)	x	x	71	117	121	x	x	0.02%	0.03%	0.03%
Other race alone (NH)	444	49	186	252	1,138	0.16%	0.02%	0.05%	0.06%	0.28%
Mixed race or Multiracial (NH)	x	x	2,507	4,021	12,891	x	x	0.69%	1.03%	3.17%
Hispanic or Latino (any race)	3,998	5,448	9,503	16,123	21,835	1.43%	1.79%	2.63%	4.14%	5.37%
Total	280,326	304,715	360,767	389,891	406,978	100.00%	100.00%	100.00%	100.00%	100.00%

=== 2020 census ===
As of the 2020 census, the county had a population of 406,978. The population density was 740.3 people per square mile (285.8 people/km^{2}). There were 172,177 housing units at an average density of 313.2 units per square mile (120.9 units/km^{2}).

The median age was 43.6 years. 21.8% of residents were under the age of 18 and 19.6% of residents were 65 years of age or older. For every 100 females there were 96.1 males, and for every 100 females age 18 and over there were 93.9 males age 18 and over.

The racial makeup of the county was 87.0% White, 1.7% Black or African American, 0.3% American Indian and Alaska Native, 3.9% Asian, <0.1% Native Hawaiian and Pacific Islander, 1.5% from some other race, and 5.7% from two or more races. Hispanic or Latino residents of any race comprised 5.4% of the population.

84.8% of residents lived in urban areas, while 15.2% lived in rural areas.

There were 164,537 households in the county, of which 28.7% had children under the age of 18 living in them. Of all households, 57.7% were married-couple households, 14.9% were households with a male householder and no spouse or partner present, and 21.9% were households with a female householder and no spouse or partner present. About 25.9% of all households were made up of individuals and 12.3% had someone living alone who was 65 years of age or older. Of these housing units, 4.4% were vacant. Among occupied housing units, 75.2% were owner-occupied and 24.8% were renter-occupied. The homeowner vacancy rate was 0.7% and the rental vacancy rate was 5.1%.

Its 2020 median income was $88,985. This ranked 97th in the nation.

=== 2010 census ===
At the 2010 census there were 389,891 people, 152,663 households, and 108,810 families living in the county. The population density was 672 people per square mile (259 people/km^{2}). There were 160,864 housing units at an average density of 277 units per square mile (107 units/km^{2}). The racial makeup of the county was 93.3% White, 1.3% Black or African American, 0.3% Native American, 2.7% Asian, 0.0003% Pacific Islander, 1.0% from other races, and 1.3% from two or more races. 4.1% of the population were Hispanic or Latino of any race. Of the 152,663 households 30.8% had children under the age of 18 living with them, 60.7% were married couples living together, 7.1% had a female householder with no husband present, and 28.7% were non-families. 23.8% of households were one person and 10.1% were one person aged 65 or older. The average household size was 2.52 and the average family size was 3.00.

The age distribution was 24.1% under the age of 18, 6.8% from 18 to 24, 23.6% from 25 to 44, 31.2% from 45 to 64, and 14.3% 65 or older. The median age was 42 years. For every 100 females there were 96.30 males. For every 100 females age 18 and over, there were 93.90 males.

2000 Census age pyramid for Waukesha County

=== 2000 census ===
At the 2000 census there were 360,767 people, 135,229 households, and 100,475 families living in the county. The population density was 649 people per square mile (251 people/km^{2}). There were 140,309 housing units at an average density of 252 units per square mile (97 units/km^{2}). The racial makeup of the county was 95.77% White, 0.73% Black or African American, 0.22% Native American, 1.49% Asian, 0.02% Pacific Islander, 0.87% from other races, and 0.90% from two or more races. 2.63% of the population were Hispanic or Latino of any race. 44.5% were of German, 9.2% Polish, 7.5% Italian, and 7.7% Irish ancestry according to Census 2000. 94.3% spoke English, 2.2% Spanish and 1.2% German as their first language. Of the 135,229 households 35.40% had children under the age of 18 living with them, 64.80% were married couples living together, 6.80% had a female householder with no husband present, and 25.70% were non-families. 20.90% of households were one person and 8.10% were one person aged 65 or older. The average household size was 2.63 and the average family size was 3.08.

The age distribution was 26.30% under the age of 18, 6.80% from 18 to 24, 29.80% from 25 to 44, 25.10% from 45 to 64, and 12.00% 65 or older. The median age was 38 years. For every 100 females there were 96.80 males. For every 100 females age 18 and over, there were 94.40 males.

The median household income was $62,839 and the median family income was $71,773. Males had a median income of $49,232 versus $31,643 for females. The per capita income for the county was $29,164. About 1.7% of families and 2.7% of the population were below the poverty line, including 2.5% of those under age 18 and 4.0% of those age 65 or over.

== Government ==
=== Elected officials ===
- County Executive: Paul Farrow
- County Board Chair: Paul Decker
- County Clerk: Meg Wartman
- Treasurer: Pamela F. Reeves (R)
- Register of Deeds: James Behrend (R)
- Clerk of Circuit Court: Kathy Madden (R)
- District Attorney: Lesli Boese (R)
- Sheriff: Eric Severson (R)

The County Board of Supervisors has 25 members, each of whom is elected from a single-member district in a nonpartisan election.

On April 3, 1990, county voters approved an amendment to the county code that converted the appointed administrator to an elected County Executive, beginning with the 1991 election. Daniel Finley, the County Board Chairman, ran for County Executive and won the 1991 election. He was re-elected in 1995, 1999, and 2003, before resigning in 2005 to lead the Milwaukee Public Museum. State Representative Daniel Vrakas was elected to succeed him at a 2005 special election and was re-elected in 2007 and 2011. The current County Board chair, James Heinrich, is acting as County Executive following the death of Paul Farrow, who was elected in 2015, and re-elected in 2019 and 2023.

Waukesha County Executives
Name	Term start	Term end	Elected
Daniel Finley	April 16, 1991	August 15, 2005	1991, 1995, 1999, 2003
James Dwyer (acting)	August 15, 2005	September 27, 2005	Became acting County Executive following Finley's resignation.
Tom Hefty (interim)	September 27, 2005	October 18, 2005	Appointed interim County Executive.
Daniel Vrakas	October 31, 2005	April 21, 2015	2005 (special), 2007, 2011
Paul Farrow	April 21, 2015	July 8, 2026	2015, 2019, 2023
James Heinrich (acting)	July 8, 2026	Incumbent	Became acting County Executive following Farrow's death.

=== Departments ===
There are 12 departments in Waukesha County, with most located in the Administration Center.

- Administration

The Department of Administration has five divisions that provide administrative services to the county: the finance division, the human resources division, the information technology division, the purchasing and risk management division, and the administrative services division.

- Aging and Disability Resource Center

The Aging and Disability Resource Center of Waukesha County (ADRC) provides information, assistance, counseling and supportive services regarding adults age 60 and above, adults with physical or developmental disabilities; and adults with mental health or substance abuse concerns. It also provides publicly funded long-term care to county residents.

- Airport

The Waukesha County Airport serves commercial and private aircraft and is supervised by the Airport Commission.

- Corporation Counsel
- Emergency Preparedness

The Department of Emergency Preparedness encompasses Waukesha County Communications, providing 9-1-1 dispatch services to the majority of the county, Waukesha County Emergency Management, and Waukesha County Radio Services, providing technical and maintenance support to the countywide trunked radio system (OASIS) and 9-1-1 centers.

- Bridges Library System

The Bridges Library System works in partnership with 16 public libraries in Waukesha County to cooperatively provide library services. This includes the purchase of shared electronic databases, summer library programming, and circulation services. Bridges also oversees Internet access for member libraries.

- Health and Human Services
- Medical Examiner

The Medical Examiner investigates suspicious or unexplained deaths or deaths that result from a homicide, suicide, or accident. The office also generates statistics for the county.

- Parks and Land Use

The Department of Parks and Land Use (PLU), oversees six divisions that design and maintain county parks. The division also works with state and federal agencies. The planning division administers permits for construction and landscaping activities. The land conservation division works to educate on and regulate soil and water issues. Most programs look to control water runoff and soil erosion. The recycling and solid waste division oversees recycling and disposal programs. It also performs educational outreach on topics such as composting and waste reduction. The official mascot of the recycling division is Recycle Raccoon. The environmental health division oversees animal welfare issues, food safety, and air, water and sewage, and safety issues (such as radon testing, well testing, and septic system monitoring). The land information systems division coordinates databases of information relating to land use and development.

- Public Works
- Sheriff
- University of Wisconsin Extension

The University of Wisconsin-Extension is a partnership with Waukesha County and brings the research of the UW System to families, businesses, governments, and organizations through educational outreach programs. The UW-Extension office also houses 180° Juvenile Diversion, a non-profit organization that rehabilitates first-time young offenders in Waukesha County.

- Veterans

== Politics ==
United States presidential election results for Waukesha County, Wisconsin
Year	Republican		Democratic		Third party(ies)	
Year	No.	%	No.	%	No.	%
1892	3,600	47.54%	3,635	48.01%	337	4.45%
1896	5,411	60.93%	3,192	35.95%	277	3.12%
1900	5,127	60.91%	3,016	35.83%	275	3.27%
1904	5,247	62.63%	2,693	32.14%	438	5.23%
1908	4,758	55.91%	3,206	37.67%	546	6.42%
1912	2,714	36.86%	3,594	48.81%	1,055	14.33%
1916	3,768	45.21%	4,192	50.29%	375	4.50%
1920	8,665	71.63%	2,759	22.81%	673	5.56%
1924	7,026	45.45%	1,965	12.71%	6,468	41.84%
1928	12,218	60.15%	7,846	38.63%	247	1.22%
1932	8,538	37.76%	13,487	59.65%	584	2.58%
1936	8,921	35.41%	14,982	59.47%	1,291	5.12%
1940	16,726	55.86%	12,859	42.94%	358	1.20%
1944	17,995	57.44%	13,038	41.62%	293	0.94%
1948	17,324	54.22%	13,952	43.67%	674	2.11%
1952	30,238	65.58%	15,756	34.17%	117	0.25%
1956	35,212	68.93%	15,496	30.33%	376	0.74%
1960	39,380	57.56%	28,963	42.33%	76	0.11%
1964	35,502	47.07%	39,796	52.76%	131	0.17%
1968	47,557	54.98%	31,947	36.93%	7,000	8.09%
1972	59,399	60.85%	34,573	35.42%	3,650	3.74%
1976	70,418	58.22%	47,487	39.26%	3,048	2.52%
1980	81,059	58.25%	46,612	33.50%	11,477	8.25%
1984	92,426	65.71%	47,313	33.64%	921	0.65%
1988	90,467	60.76%	57,598	38.68%	828	0.56%
1992	91,461	51.04%	50,270	28.06%	37,451	20.90%
1996	91,729	55.43%	57,354	34.66%	16,389	9.90%
2000	133,105	65.33%	64,319	31.57%	6,310	3.10%
2004	154,926	67.25%	73,626	31.96%	1,811	0.79%
2008	145,152	62.32%	85,339	36.64%	2,406	1.03%
2012	162,798	66.76%	78,779	32.31%	2,279	0.93%
2016	142,543	59.99%	79,224	33.34%	15,826	6.66%
2020	159,649	59.57%	103,906	38.77%	4,441	1.66%
2024	162,768	59.02%	108,478	39.33%	4,541	1.65%

Waukesha County is the largest Republican-leaning county in Wisconsin and has been one of the most Republican suburban counties in the nation for many years. It is one of the WOW counties, which share similar traits in suburban Milwaukee. Although the county's Republican lean has somewhat lessened since the 2010s, the county is still a Republican stronghold.

It has not supported a Democrat for president since 1964, and has only supported a Democrat four other times since 1892. While other non-Southern suburban counties have moved towards Democrats since the 1990s, Waukesha and the other WOW counties have continued to vote solidly Republican. Underlining this, Lyndon Johnson's narrow win in 1964 is the last time that a Democratic presidential candidate has even garnered 40 percent of the county's vote, though Jimmy Carter, Michael Dukakis, Joe Biden, and Kamala Harris came close. In 2008, John McCain carried the county by a 25.7% margin over Barack Obama, when Obama won Wisconsin by 13.9% over McCain. In 2024, Kamala Harris became the first Democrat since 1976 to lose the county by less than 20 percentage points.

== Communities ==
=== Cities ===
- Brookfield
- Delafield
- Milwaukee (small portion)
- Muskego (town until 1964)
- New Berlin (town until 1959)
- Oconomowoc
- Pewaukee (town until 1999)
- Waukesha (county seat)

=== Villages ===
- Big Bend
- Butler
- Chenequa
- Dousman
- Eagle
- Elm Grove
- Hartland
- Lac La Belle (partly in Jefferson County)
- Lannon
- Lisbon (town until 2023)
- Menomonee Falls
- Merton
- Mukwonago (partly in Walworth County)
- Nashotah
- North Prairie
- Oconomowoc Lake
- Pewaukee
- Summit (town until 2010)
- Sussex
- Vernon (town until 2020)
- Wales
- Waukesha (town until 2020)

=== Towns ===
- Brookfield
- Delafield
- Eagle
- Genesee
- Merton
- Mukwonago
- Oconomowoc
- Ottawa

=== Census-designated places ===
- North Lake
- Okauchee Lake (absorbed into Lac La Belle in 2025)

=== Unincorporated communities ===
- Bethesda
- Buena Vista
- Camp Whitcomb
- Colgate (partly in Washington County)
- Eagleville
- Genesee
- Genesee Depot
- Goerke's Corners
- Guthrie
- Jericho
- Lake Five (partly in Washington County)
- Mapleton
- Monches
- Monterey
- Ottawa
- Saylesville
- Stone Bank
- Summit Center
- Summit Corners
- Vernon
- Waterville

=== Ghost towns/neighborhoods ===
- Calhoun
- Dodges Corners
- DeNoon
- Duplainville
- Muskego Settlement
- New Upsala

Note – for zoning purposes, a single acre of Waukesha County was annexed by the city of Milwaukee in 2003 to accommodate the Ambrosia Chocolate Factory.

== Climate ==
Waukesha County

Climate chart (precipitation, max. and min. temperature)
J	F	M	A	M	J	J	A	S	O	N	D
102 −6 −14	96 −4 −12	69 5 −5	160 18 3	102 23 9	148 25 14	95 27 17	105 26 17	70 22 13	95 15 5	66 8 −1	79 −2 −11
- █ Average max. and min. temperatures in °C
- █ Precipitation totals in mm
Imperial conversion
J	F	M	A	M	J	J	A	S	O	N	D
4 21 7	3.8 25 10	2.7 41 23	6.3 64 37	4 73 48	5.8 77 57	3.7 81 63	4.1 79 63	2.8 72 55	3.7 59 41	2.6 46 30	3.1 28 12
- █ Average max. and min. temperatures in °F
- █ Precipitation totals in inches

== Education ==
School districts include:

K-12:

- Elmbrook School District
- Hamilton School District
- Kettle Moraine School District
- Menomonee Falls School District
- Mukwonago School District
- Muskego-Norway School District
- New Berlin School District
- Norris School District
- Oconomowoc Area School District
- Palmyra-Eagle Area School District
- Pewaukee School District
- Waukesha School District
- West Allis School District

Secondary:

- Arrowhead Union High School District
- Waterford Union High School District

Elementary:

- Hartland-Lakeside Joint No. 3 School District
- Lake Country School District
- Merton Community School District
- North Lake School District
- Richmond School District
- Stone Bank School District
- Swallow School District
- Washington-Caldwell School District

== Transportation ==
=== Railroads ===
- Canadian National
- Canadian Pacific
- Union Pacific
- Wisconsin and Southern Railroad

=== Buses ===
- Waukesha Metro Transit

== See also ==
- National Register of Historic Places listings in Waukesha County, Wisconsin
- Waukesha County gangsters
- Waukesha County Park System
- Waukesha, Wisconsin
- Waukesha (village), Wisconsin
