= Lake Country Trail =

Paved multipurpose rail trail in Waukesha County, Wisconsin

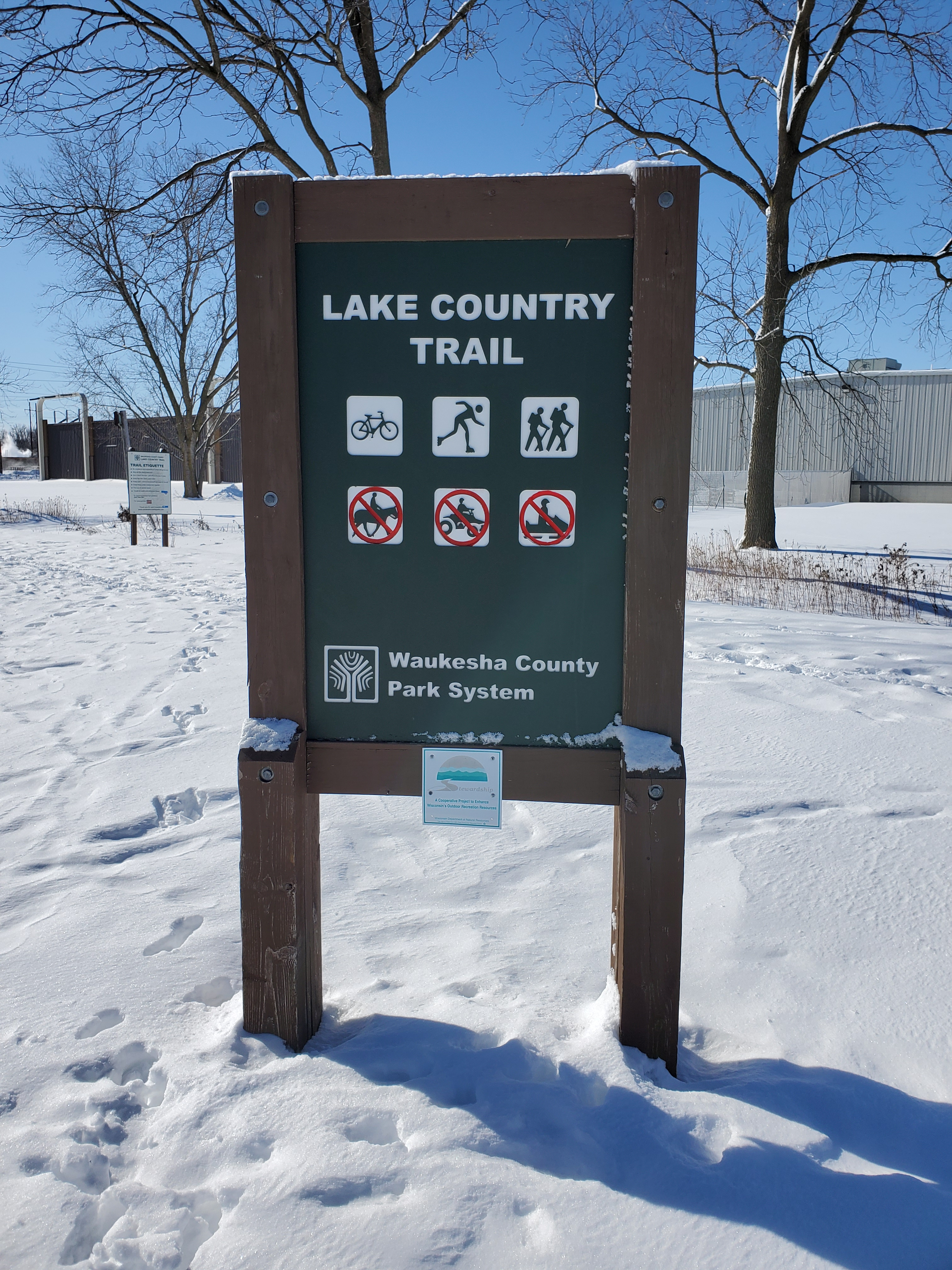
- The trailhead in Oconomowoc
- Length: 15.2 mi (24.5 km)
- Location: Waukesha County, Wisconsin, United States
- Trailheads: Oconomowoc; 43°06′18″N 88°30′06″W; Pewaukee; 43°02′49″N 88°16′18″W
- Use: Hiking and biking
- Elevation gain/loss: 429 feet (131 m)
- Surface: Asphalt

The Lake Country Trail is a paved multipurpose rail trail in Waukesha County, Wisconsin. It stretches 15.2 miles (24.5 km) from the intersection of W Jefferson St. and S Franklin St. in Oconomowoc to the Landsberg Center Trailhead on Golf Rd. in Pewaukee. It also passes through the Wisconsin communities of Summit and Delafield.

The trail follows the old Milwaukee–Watertown interurban line, operated by The Milwaukee Electric Railway and Light Company (TMER&L). The line was abandoned and the rails torn out in the early 1940s; however, overhead electric lines operated by the Wisconsin Electric Power Company still remain.

== History ==
The trail was originally made of crushed limestone before it was paved with asphalt in 2011.
