= Lake Five, Wisconsin =

- Unincorporated community
- Location within Wisconsin Location within the United States
- Coordinates: 43°11′33″N 88°16′15″W
- Country: United States
- State: Wisconsin
- County: Waukesha
- Elevation: 981 ft (299 m)
- Time zone: UTC-6 (Central (CST))
  - Summer (DST): UTC-5 (CDT)
- Area code: 262
- GNIS feature ID: 1567735

Lake Five is an unincorporated community located in the village of Richfield, Washington County, Wisconsin, United States. Lake Five is located on County Highway Q along the southern border of Washington County; it abuts the town of Lisbon, Waukesha County to the south. The Lake Five post office was established in May 1855 by its first postmaster, Patrick McGovern.

== Notable people ==
- George Noller, farmer and legislator, lived in Lake Five.
