= George Noller =

American politician (1843–1906)

George Noller (February 2, 1843 – May 13, 1906) was an American farmer and politician.

Born in what is now Germany, Noller emigrated to the United States in 1851 and settled in Delafield, Wisconsin. He then lived in Richfield, Wisconsin and finally in Lake Five, Wisconsin where he farmed. Noller served as town treasurer and was a Democrat. He served in the Wisconsin State Assembly in 1883. Noller died at his home in Lake Five, Wisconsin.
