= Waukesha County gangsters =

In the early 1900s Waukesha County, Wisconsin was a big resort area and vacation spot for people living in Chicago. Among the people who visited Oconomowoc's for a little rest and relaxation were Chicago's most notorious gangsters, such as Baby Face Nelson, Bugs Moran, John Dillinger and Al Capone. Wisconsin's heavily wooded areas were perfect for laying low after a job.

== What Is Happening ==
The main gangster activity in Waukesha County in the early 1900s usually involved alcohol of some sort: smuggling it in from Canada (usually on a seaplane that would land in one of Waukesha's many lakes), distilling liquor in a hidden still, or loading it on to trucks and shipping it around the country. During Prohibition this was all highly illegal. Despite all the illicit activity gangsters were often seen in a positive light. "A lot of (gangsters) had Robin Hood stories attached to them, like Pretty Boy Floyd and Bonnie and Clyde," said Mr. Jeffrey Pickron, a University of Wisconsin–Oshkosh history professor. "And a lot of these gangsters stories would talk about how they stole from the rich and gave the money to the poor." Gangsters had money, they lived exciting lives, and they lived by their own rules. It's not that surprising that public opinion of "criminals" was somewhat high. Gangsters were constantly doing things that made them endearing to others. "There are plenty of stories, for example, of gangsters pulling into a service station, buying $1 worth of gas and giving the attendant a $20 tip." They had a freedom that normal people during the Great Depression just didn't have.

== Capone's Vacation Home ==
Al Capone supposedly owned a vacation home right off on Bluemound Road in Brookfield, Wisconsin. Legend has it that he picked this spot because there were no police departments in the area, instead it was patrolled by county sheriff deputies, most of whom were paid off to turn a blind eye.

== Capone's Hit On Zuta ==
In 1930 one of Capone's bookkeepers, a man by the name of Jack Zuta, defected to George "Bugs" Moran's gang. Knowing that Capone did not like disloyalty, Zuta decided to lie low under the name "J.H. Goodman" at the Lake View Resort on Upper Lake Nemahbin in the town of Summit. Knowing it was only a matter of time before Capone's hit squad caught up with him, Zuta made a desperate call from an Oconomowoc drug store, begging for body guards to escort him down to Chicago. Unfortunately for him, he was overheard. Around sunset on August 1, 1930 Capone's hitsquad walked into the Lake View resort, threw open the back door, shot Zuta, and walked out the way they came in.
