= North Lake, Wisconsin =

Census-designated place in Wisconsin, United States

- Census-designated place
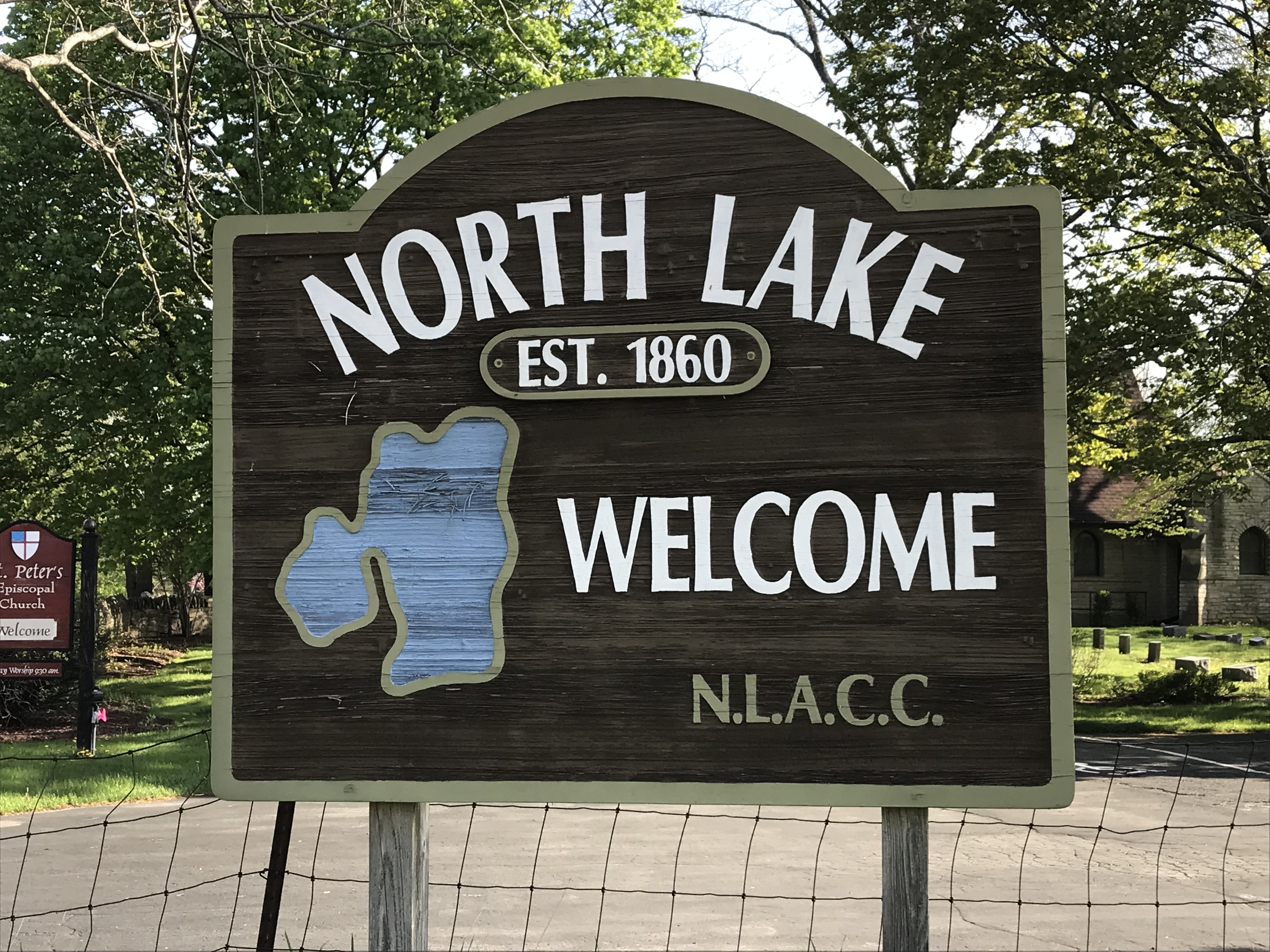

- Location within Wisconsin Location within the United States
- Coordinates: 43°09′22″N 88°22′14″W
- Country: United States
- State: Wisconsin
- County: Waukesha

Area
  - Total: 0.27 sq mi (0.70 km^{2})
  - Land: 0.24 sq mi (0.61 km^{2})
  - Water: 0.035 sq mi (0.09 km^{2})
- Elevation: 928 ft (283 m)

Population (2020)
  - Total: 247
- Time zone: UTC-6 (Central (CST))
  - Summer (DST): UTC-5 (CDT)
- ZIP code: 53064
- Area code: 262
- GNIS feature ID: 1570456

Historical population
| Census | Pop. | Note | %± |
|---|---|---|---|
| 2020 | 247 | | — |
U.S. Decennial Census

North Lake is an unincorporated community and census-designated place located in the town of Merton, in Waukesha County, Wisconsin, United States. It was first named a CDP at the 2020 census, which showed a population of 247. North Lake is located on Wisconsin Highway 83 north of Chenequa. North Lake has a post office with ZIP code 53064.

== History ==
James Barney Marsh (1856–1936), engineer and bridge builder, was born in North Lake.

The land was initially school land, and during 1850 and 1851, Henry Shears built a sawmill. In 1853, he erected the present gristmill, shaping the community's early development

== Lake specifications ==
North Lake has a 440-acre lake within Waukesha County, The lake's maximum depth reaches 78.4 feet, Its waters have low clarity. Fish species include Panfish, Largemouth Bass, Smallmouth Bass, Northern Pike, and Walleye.
