= Okauchee Lake, Wisconsin =

Census-designated place in Wisconsin, United States

- CDP
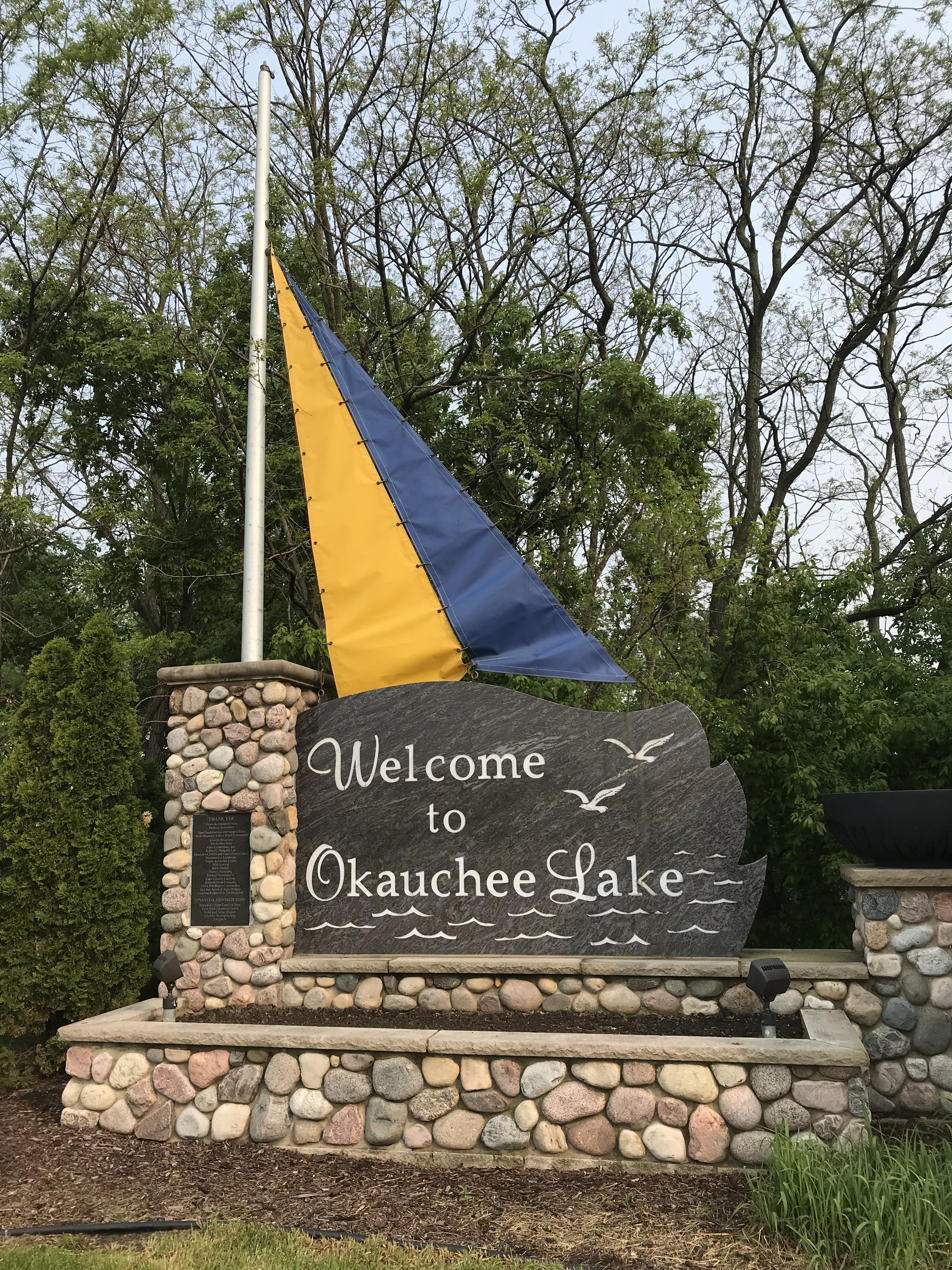

- Location in Waukesha County and the state of Wisconsin.
- Coordinates: 43°7′10″N 88°26′23″W
- Country: United States
- State: Wisconsin
- County: Waukesha

Area
  - Total: 4.9 sq mi (13 km^{2})
  - Land: 3.4 sq mi (8.8 km^{2})
  - Water: 1.5 sq mi (3.9 km^{2})
- Elevation: 883 ft (269 m)

Population (2020)
  - Total: 5,094
  - Density: 1,500/sq mi (580/km^{2})
- Time zone: UTC-6 (Central (CST))
  - Summer (DST): UTC-5 (CDT)
- FIPS code: 55-59650
- GNIS feature ID: 1867663

Okauchee Lake was a census-designated place (CDP) in Waukesha County, Wisconsin, United States. The population was 5,094 at the 2020 census. Okauchee Lake is located in the village of Lac La Belle.

== Geography ==
Okauchee Lake is located at 43°7′10″N 88°26′23″W (43.119454, −88.439839).

According to the United States Census Bureau, the CDP has a total area of 4.9 square miles (12.6 km^{2}), of which 3.4 square miles (8.8 km^{2}) is land and 1.5 square miles (3.8 km^{2}) (30.00%) is water.

== Demographics ==
Historical population
| Census | Pop. | Note | %± |
|---|---|---|---|
| 2000 | 3,916 | | — |
| 2010 | 4,422 | | 12.9% |
| 2020 | 5,094 | | 15.2% |
U.S. Decennial Census

As of the census of 2000, there were 3,916 people, 1,511 households, and 1,119 families residing in the CDP. The population density was 1,126.7 people per square mile (434.5/km^{2}). There were 1,711 housing units at an average density of 492.3/sq mi (189.8/km^{2}). The racial makeup of the CDP was 98.60% White, 0.20% African American, 0.05% Native American, 0.15% Asian, 0.03% Pacific Islander, 0.26% from other races, and 0.72% from two or more races. Hispanic or Latino of any race were 0.66% of the population.

There were 1,511 households, out of which 33.2% had children under the age of 18 living with them, 67.0% were married couples living together, 4.4% had a female householder with no husband present, and 25.9% were non-families. 19.3% of all households were made up of individuals, and 5.6% had someone living alone who was 65 years of age or older. The average household size was 2.59 and the average family size was 3.02.

In the CDP, the population was spread out, with 24.3% under the age of 18, 5.6% from 18 to 24, 30.8% from 25 to 44, 30.3% from 45 to 64, and 9.0% who were 65 years of age or older. The median age was 40 years. For every 100 females, there were 108.4 males. For every 100 females age 18 and over, there were 108.7 males.

The median income for a household in the CDP was $66,042, and the median income for a family was $73,300. Males had a median income of $47,420 versus $31,985 for females. The per capita income for the CDP was $40,508. About 1.9% of families and 2.0% of the population were below the poverty line, including 0.9% of those under age 18 and 12.1% of those age 65 or over.

== Education ==
Most of the community is in the Oconomowoc Area School District, with a portion in the Stone Bank School District (elementary) and the Arrowhead Union High School District. Oconomowoc High School is the public high school of the Oconomowoc district.
