= Lac La Belle, Wisconsin =

- Village
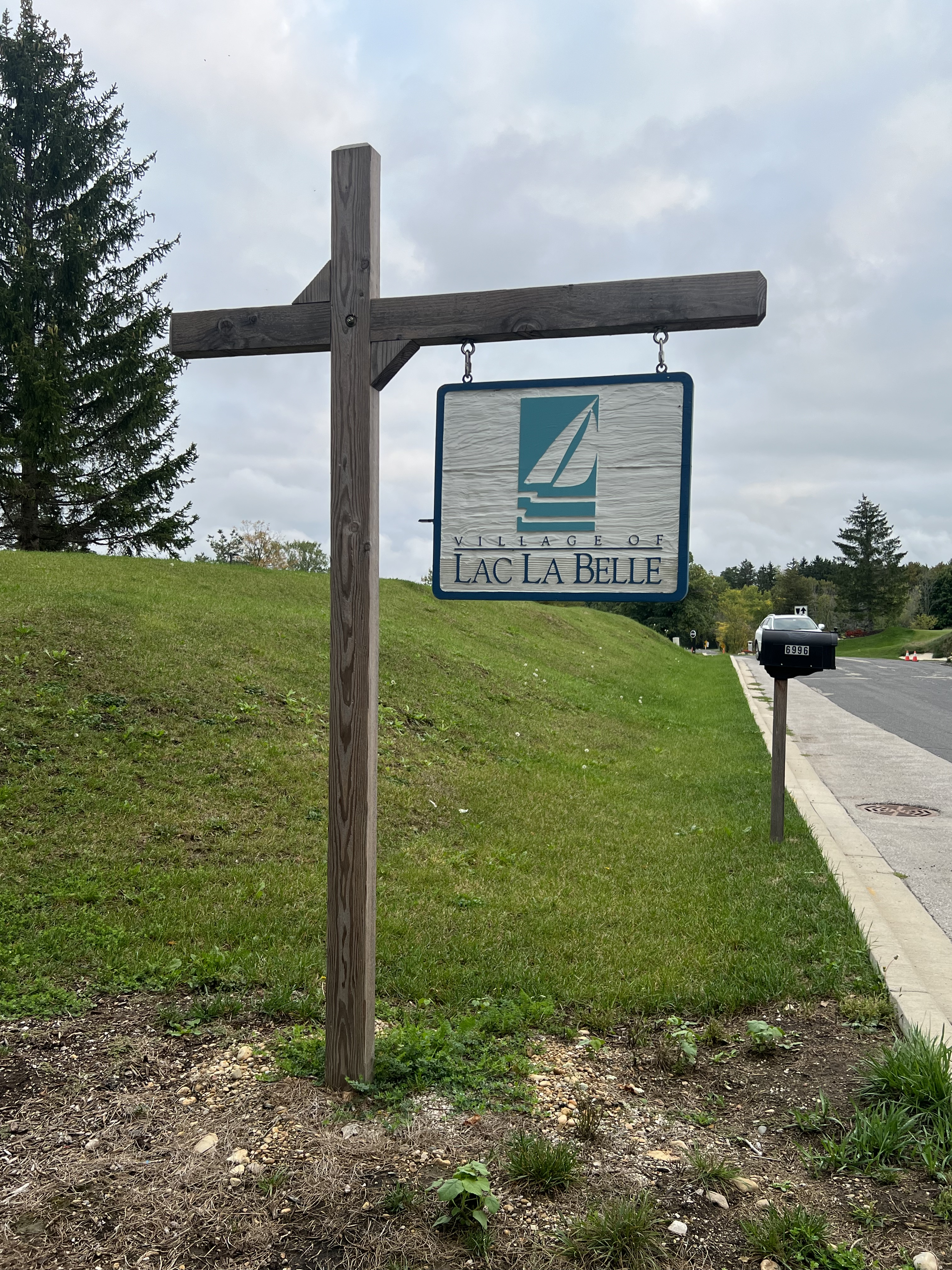

- Location of Lac La Belle in Waukesha and Jefferson Counties in Wisconsin.
- Coordinates: 43°8′44″N 88°31′33″W
- Country: United States
- State: Wisconsin
- County: Jefferson, Waukesha

Government
  - Type: Village Board
  - Village President: Robert Hultquist

Area
  - Total: 1.03 sq mi (2.67 km^{2})
  - Land: 1.02 sq mi (2.65 km^{2})
  - Water: 0.0077 sq mi (0.02 km^{2})
- Elevation: 856 ft (261 m)

Population (2020)
  - Total: 281
  - Density: 292.2/sq mi (112.83/km^{2})
- Time zone: UTC-6 (Central (CST))
  - Summer (DST): UTC-5 (CDT)
- FIPS code: 55-40750
- GNIS feature ID: 1567709
- Website: www.laclabelle-wi.gov

Lac La Belle is a village located in Waukesha and Jefferson counties in the U.S. state of Wisconsin. The population was 281 at the 2020 census.

== History ==
Lac La Belle began as a community of vacation homes for residents of larger Midwestern cities. It incorporated in 1931, with a population of 66. On March 28, 2002, the village annexed a portion of land in the town of Ixonia in Jefferson County.

On January 1, 2025, the Village of Lac La Belle annexed the vast majority of the Town of Oconomowoc.

== Geography ==
Lac La Belle is located at 43°8′44″N 88°31′33″W (43.145460, −88.525757) in the "Lake Country" area of Waukesha County.

According to the United States Census Bureau, the village has a total area of 0.98 square miles (2.54 km^{2}), all land.

== Demographics ==
Historical population
Census	Pop.	Note	%±
1940	66		—
1950	174		163.6%
1960	276		58.6%
1970	227		−17.8%
1980	289		27.3%
1990	258		−10.7%
2000	329		27.5%
2010	290		−11.9%
2020	281		−3.1%
U.S. Decennial Census

=== 2010 census ===
As of the census of 2010, there were 290 people, 115 households, and 97 families living in the village. The population density was 295.9 inhabitants per square mile (114.2/km^{2}). There were 135 housing units at an average density of 137.8 per square mile (53.2/km^{2}). The racial makeup of the village was 98.6% White, 0.3% Asian, 0.3% from other races, and 0.7% from two or more races. Hispanic or Latino of any race were 0.3% of the population.

There were 115 households, of which 25.2% had children under the age of 18 living with them, 80.0% were married couples living together, 4.3% had a female householder with no husband present, and 15.7% were non-families. 13.0% of all households were made up of individuals, and 9.6% had someone living alone who was 65 years of age or older. The average household size was 2.52 and the average family size was 2.77.

The median age in the village was 53.8 years. 21% of residents were under the age of 18; 2.1% were between the ages of 18 and 24; 13.8% were from 25 to 44; 41.8% were from 45 to 64; and 21.4% were 65 years of age or older. The gender makeup of the village was 49.0% male and 51.0% female.

=== 2000 census ===
As of the census of 2000, there were 329 people, 117 households, and 109 families living in the village. The population density was 484.1 people per square mile (186.8/km^{2}). There were 127 housing units at an average density of 186.9 per square mile (72.1/km^{2}). The racial makeup of the village was 99.70% White, 0.30% from other races. Hispanic or Latino of any race were 0.30% of the population.

There were 117 households, out of which 35.9% had children under the age of 18 living with them, 84.6% were married couples living together, 9.4% had a female householder with no husband present, and 6.0% were non-families. 3.4% of all households were made up of individuals, and 1.7% had someone living alone who was 65 years of age or older. The average household size was 2.81 and the average family size was 2.88.

In the village, the population was spread out, with 22.8% under the age of 18, 4.6% from 18 to 24, 24.6% from 25 to 44, 37.1% from 45 to 64, and 10.9% who were 65 years of age or older. The median age was 44 years. For every 100 females, there were 91.3 males. For every 100 females age 18 and over, there were 91.0 males.

The median income for a household in the village was $96,712, and the median income for a family was $100,000. Males had a median income of $89,119 versus $39,375 for females. The per capita income for the village was $46,749. About 2.7% of families and 1.8% of the population were below the poverty line, including 2.5% of those under age 18 and none of those age 65 or over.

== Education ==
All portions of Lac La Belle are in the Oconomowoc Area School District. Oconomowoc High School is the local high school.

== Recreation ==
Lac La Belle is home to Wisconsin's second oldest 18-hole golf course, La Belle Golf Club. Originally called Lac La Belle, it opened in 1896.

The village is also home to Camp Olin-Sang-Ruby Union Institute (OSRUI), a Union for Reform Judaism summer camp.

== Government services ==
The village offers a plethora of services to its residents and visitors. Full time law enforcement services are provided by the Village of Lac La Belle Police Department. Fire and EMS services are provided by the Western Lakes Fire District. Other services are provided by the Department of Public Works/Highway and clerks.
