= Mike Solwold =

American football player (born 1977)

No. 43, 45
- Positions: Long snapper, tight end

Personal information
- Born: September 30, 1977 (age 49); Menomonee Falls, Wisconsin, U.S.
- Listed height: 6 ft 6 in (1.98 m)
- Listed weight: 244 lb (111 kg)

Career information
- High school: Arrowhead (WI)
- College: Wisconsin
- NFL draft: 2001: undrafted

Career history
- Minnesota Vikings (2001)*; Dallas Cowboys (2001); Tampa Bay Buccaneers (2002); Baltimore Ravens (2003–2004); New England Patriots (2005)
- * Offseason or practice squad member only

Awards and highlights
- Super Bowl champion (XXXVII); 2× Rose Bowl champion (1999, 2000)

Career NFL statistics
- Games played: 33
- Stats at Pro Football Reference

Michael Stuart Solwold (born September 30, 1977) is an American former professional football player who was a long snapper and tight end in the National Football League (NFL) for the Dallas Cowboys, Minnesota Vikings, Tampa Bay Buccaneers, Baltimore Ravens, and New England Patriots. He played college football for the Wisconsin Badgers.

== Early life ==
Solwold attended Arrowhead High School, where he was named an All-American, All-State, All-Region and All-Conference at tight end, while receiving the 1995-1996 Wisconsin Gatorade State Player of the year award as a senior.

He contributed to his team winning two WIAA Division I state championships (1993 and 1994). He also was a three-year starter in basketball.

== College career ==
Solwold accepted a football scholarship from the University of Wisconsin–Madison. As a freshman, he took over long snapper Mike Schneck, who injured his wrist while celebrating Matt Davenport's game-winning field goal against Indiana University.

In 1999, he became the team's long snapper as a junior and was a part of two Big Ten Conference championships and two Rose Bowl wins.

== Professional career ==
=== Minnesota Vikings ===
Solwold was signed as an undrafted free agent by the Minnesota Vikings after the 2001 NFL draft on April 23. He was waived on August 27.

=== Dallas Cowboys ===
On August 30, 2001, Solwold was claimed off waivers by the Dallas Cowboys, who were looking to replace long snapper Dale Hellestrae who was released in a salary-cap move. On September 4, the Cowboys claimed long snapper Randy Chevrier and cut Solwold. On November 14, he was re-signed after Chevrier struggled for three games. He was released on April 18, 2002.

=== Tampa Bay Buccaneers ===
On May 3, 2002, he was signed as a free agent by the Tampa Bay Buccaneers. He suffered a broken left foot in the fourth game against the Cincinnati Bengals. He was placed on the injured reserve list on October 1. He wasn't re-signed after the season.

=== Baltimore Ravens ===
On June 9, 2003, Solwold signed with the Baltimore Ravens as a free agent, to compete against starter Joe Maese. He was cut on August 30 and signed to the practice squad two days later. He was promoted to the active roster on December 11 and was declared inactive for the last 3 games, to avoid losing him to the New England Patriots. In 2004, he was cut on the first day of training camp, after recovering from a torn chest muscle that he suffered in the first minicamp. On December 12, he was signed to replace an injured Maese.

=== New England Patriots ===
On January 12, 2005, he was signed by the New England Patriots to the practice squad for the playoffs. He wasn't re-signed after the season.
