= Hartland-Lakeside School District =

School district in Wisconsin, US

Hartland-Lakeside Joint No. 3 School District (also known as the Hartland-Lakeside School District) is a school district headquartered in Hartland, Wisconsin.

The district includes the majority of Hartland as well as portions of Delafield Town and Merton Town. It feeds into the Arrowhead High School District. The superintendent is Tina Vogelmann

== History ==
The district formerly allowed special education students to attend other school districts, but in 2003 it rescinded almost all such permissions.

== Schools ==
There are three schools:

- North Shore Middle School, grades 6–8
- Hartland North Elementary School, grades PK–2
- Hartland South Elementary School, grades 3–5
