= Lisbon, Waukesha County, Wisconsin =

Lisbon, Wisconsin
- Village
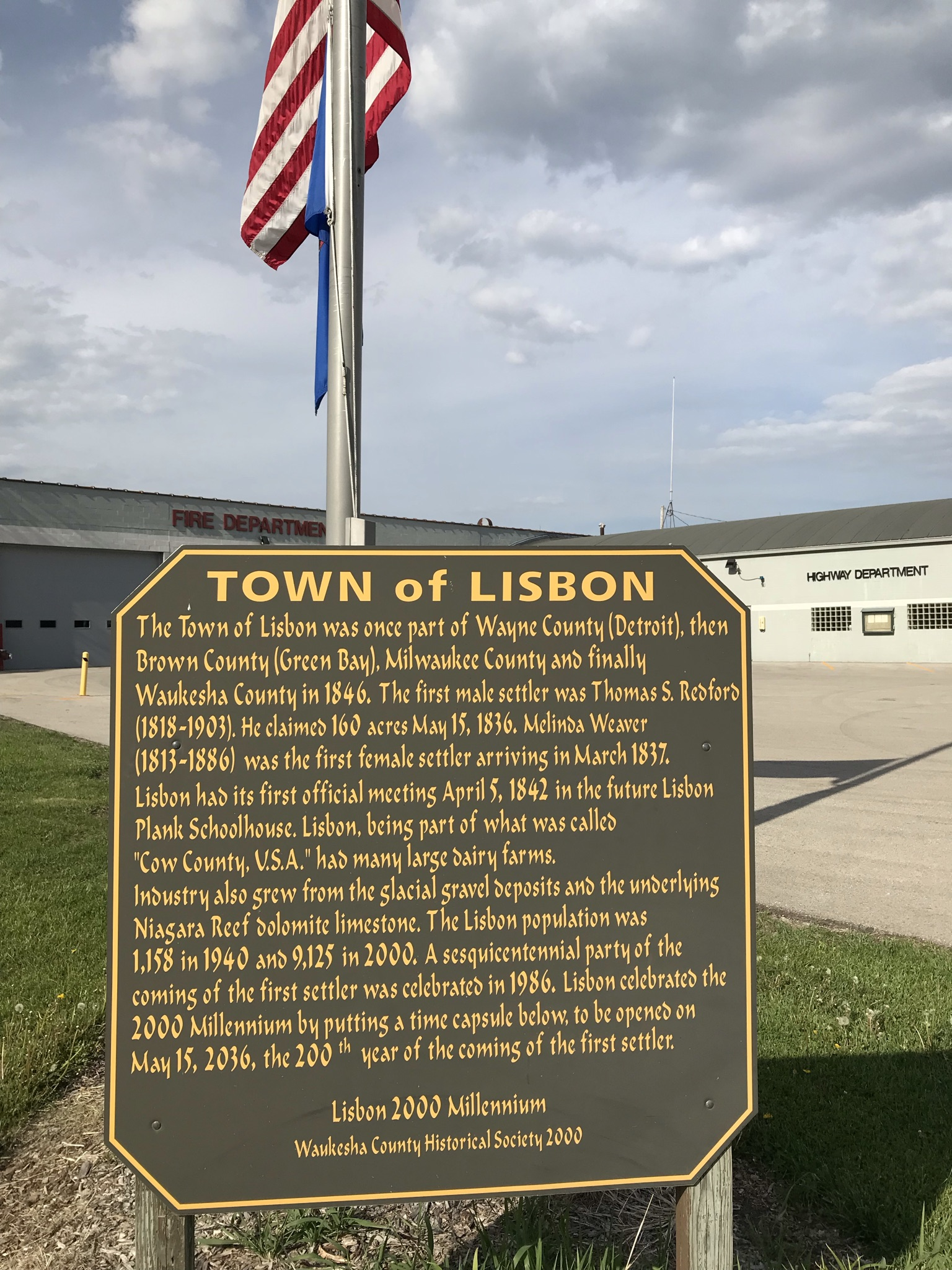
- Historical sign outside the fire and highway departments detailing Lisbon village history

- Location in Waukesha County and the state of Wisconsin.
- Coordinates: 43°8′58″N 88°14′29″W
- Country: United States
- State: Wisconsin
- County: Waukesha

Area
  - Total: 26.81 sq mi (69.44 km^{2})
  - Land: 26.81 sq mi (69.44 km^{2})
  - Water: 0 sq mi (0.0 km^{2})
- Elevation: 968 ft (295 m)

Population (2020)
  - Total: 10,477
  - Density: 317/sq mi (122.3/km^{2})
- Time zone: UTC-6 (Central (CST))
  - Summer (DST): UTC-5 (CDT)
- FIPS code: 55-44847
- GNIS feature ID: 2831240
- Website: https://www.lisbonwi.gov/

Lisbon is a village in Waukesha County, Wisconsin, United States. The population was 10,477 at the 2020 census. The unincorporated communities of Colgate and Lake Five are located partially in the village.

== History ==
The first settler in what became the town of Lisbon was Thomas S. Redford, who claimed 160 acres in the area in 1836. The town of Lisbon was created by the legislature of the Wisconsin Territory in 1838, ten years before Wisconsin achieved statehood. The boundaries originally included what are now Pewaukee, Brookfield, and Menomonee Falls before those three were also granted town status in 1839. The town government of Lisbon first met on April 15, 1842, in the future Lisbon Plank Schoolhouse.

The village of Sussex was founded in the middle of the town in 1924, and over time annexed pieces of the town of Lisbon. The town's economy relied on farms and stone quarries for much of its history. Lannon stone, a glacial dolomitic limestone, continues to be mined in the town along with gravel deposits.

Lisbon sought incorporation in 2011 and 2020 before the state approved the town's efforts to proceed with a referendum, which was held in January 2023. Residents approved incorporation as a village, which was certified by the state in February 2023.

== Geography ==
According to the United States Census Bureau, the town has a total area of 29.81 square miles (77.2 km^{2}), all land.

== Demographics ==
Historical population
Census	Pop.	Note	%±
1980	8,352		—
1990	8,277		−0.9%
2000	9,359		13.1%
2010	10,157		8.5%
2020	10,477		3.2%

As of the census of 2000, there were 9,359 people, 3,218 households, and 2,738 families residing in the town. The population density was 316.8 people per square mile (122.3 people/km^{2}). There were 3,271 housing units at an average density of 110.7 per square mile (42.7/km^{2}). The racial makeup of the town was 98.62% White, 0.21% African American, 0.28% Native American, 0.37% Asian, 0.04% from other races, and 0.47% from two or more races. Hispanic or Latino of any race were 0.73% of the population.

There were 3,218 households, out of which 40.1% had children under the age of 18 living with them, 78.9% were married couples living together, 3.9% had a female householder with no husband present, and 14.9% were non-families. 12.3% of all households were made up of individuals, and 6.4% had someone living alone who was 65 years of age or older. The average household size was 2.90 and the average family size was 3.17.

In the town, the population was spread out, with 27.7% under the age of 18, 5.9% from 18 to 24, 29.0% from 25 to 44, 26.9% from 45 to 64, and 10.5% who were 65 years of age or older. The median age was 39 years. For every 100 females, there were 99.6 males. For every 100 females age 18 and over, there were 97.5 males.

The median income for a household in the town was $69,012, and the median income for a family was $75,202. Males had a median income of $51,839 versus $32,362 for females. The per capita income for the town was $26,550. About 0.9% of families and 2.6% of the population were below the poverty line, including 3.2% of those under age 18 and 9.6% of those age 65 or over.

== See also ==
- List of villages in Wisconsin
- List of U.S. places named after non-U.S. places
