= Merton (village), Wisconsin =

Merton, Wisconsin
- Village
- Merton village hall

- Location of Merton in Waukesha County, Wisconsin.
- Coordinates: 43°8′42″N 88°21′40″W
- Country: United States
- State: Wisconsin
- County: Waukesha

Government
  - President: Ron Reinowski
  - Trustee: Mark Baral
  - Trustee: Kristal Stippich
  - Trustee: Bruce Blawat
  - Trustee: Mike Schwabe

Area
  - Total: 3.39 sq mi (8.78 km^{2})
  - Land: 3.32 sq mi (8.59 km^{2})
  - Water: 0.073 sq mi (0.19 km^{2})
- Elevation: 948 ft (289 m)

Population (2020)
  - Total: 3,441
  - Density: 1,130/sq mi (438/km^{2})
- Time zone: UTC-6 (Central (CST))
  - Summer (DST): UTC-5 (CDT)
- Postal code: 53029
- Area code: 262
- FIPS code: 55-51400
- GNIS feature ID: 1569376
- Website: www.villageofmerton.com

Merton is a village in Waukesha County, Wisconsin, United States. The population was 3,441 at the 2020 census. It is partially within the Town of Merton.

== Geography ==
Merton is at 43°8'28" North, 88°18'34" West (43.141308, -88.309613) in the Lake Country area of Waukesha County. According to the United States Census Bureau, the village has a total area of 3.07 square miles (7.95 km^{2}), of which 3.00 square miles (7.77 km^{2}) is land and 0.07 square miles (0.18 km^{2}) is water.

== Demographics ==
As of 2011, the population was 3,353.

Historical population
Census	Pop.	Note	%±
1880	210		—
1930	232		—
1940	254		9.5%
1950	343		35.0%
1960	407		18.7%
1970	646		58.7%
1980	1,045		61.8%
1990	1,199		14.7%
2000	1,926		60.6%
2010	3,346		73.7%
2020	3,441		2.8%
U.S. Decennial Census

=== 2010 census ===
As of the census of 2010, there were 3,346 people, 1,020 households, and 934 families living in the village. The population density was 1,115.3 inhabitants per square mile (430.6/km^{2}). There were 1,054 housing units at an average density of 351.3 per square mile (135.6/km^{2}). The racial makeup of the village was 95.5% White, 0.7% African American, 0.3% Native American, 1.5% Asian, 0.1% Pacific Islander, 0.6% from other races, and 1.3% from two or more races. Hispanic or Latino of any race were 2.2% of the population.

There were 1,020 households, of which 55.3% had children under the age of 18 living with them, 83.1% were married couples living together, 5.0% had a female householder with no husband present, 3.4% had a male householder with no wife present, and 8.4% were non-families. 6.3% of all households were made up of individuals, and 1.9% had someone living alone who was 65 years of age or older. The average household size was 3.28 and the average family size was 3.44.

The median age in the village was 37.8 years. 34.8% of residents were under the age of 18; 5.7% were between the ages of 18 and 24; 25.5% were from 25 to 44; 28.6% were from 45 to 64; and 5.4% were 65 years of age or older. The gender makeup of the village was 51.9% male and 48.1% female.

=== 2000 census ===
The census of 2000 recorded that there were 1,926 people, 591 households, and 527 families living in the village. The population density was 730.7 people per square mile (281.7/km^{2}). There were 598 housing units at an average density of 226.9 per square mile (87.5/km^{2}). The racial makeup of the village was 98.65% White, 0.42% Black or African American, 0.21% Native American, 0.21% Asian, 0.00% Pacific Islander, 0.00% from other races, and 0.52% from two or more races. 0.73% of the population were Hispanic or Latino of any race.

There were 591 households, out of which 56.2% had children under the age of 18 living with them, 80.2% were married couples living together, 4.9% had a female householder with no husband present, and 10.7% were non-families. 8.3% of all households were made up of individuals, and 2.7% had someone living alone who was 65 years of age or older. The average household size was 3.26 and the average family size was 3.47.

In the village, the population age-spread was: 36.2% under the age of 18, 5.0% from 18 to 24, 32.9% from 25 to 44, 22.0% from 45 to 64, and 3.9% who were 65 years of age or older. The median age was 34 years. For every 100 females, there were 104.0 males. For every 100 females age 18 and over, there were 102.8 males.

The median income for a household in the village was $71,509, and the median income for a family was $75,000. Males had a median income of $50,402 as against $30,380 for females. The per capita income for the village was $24,927. 1.6% of the population and 1.6% of families were below the poverty line. Out of the total population, 1.9% of those under the age of 18 and 2.6% of those 65 and older were living below the poverty line.

== Education ==
Merton is served by Merton Primary School (grades 4K to 4) and Merton Intermediate School (grades 5-8). Merton Intermediate students are then enrolled at Arrowhead High School.

== Notable people ==
- Judson Hall, Wisconsin State Representative, lived in Merton; he served as village president of Hartland.
