= Merton, Wisconsin =

Merton
- Town
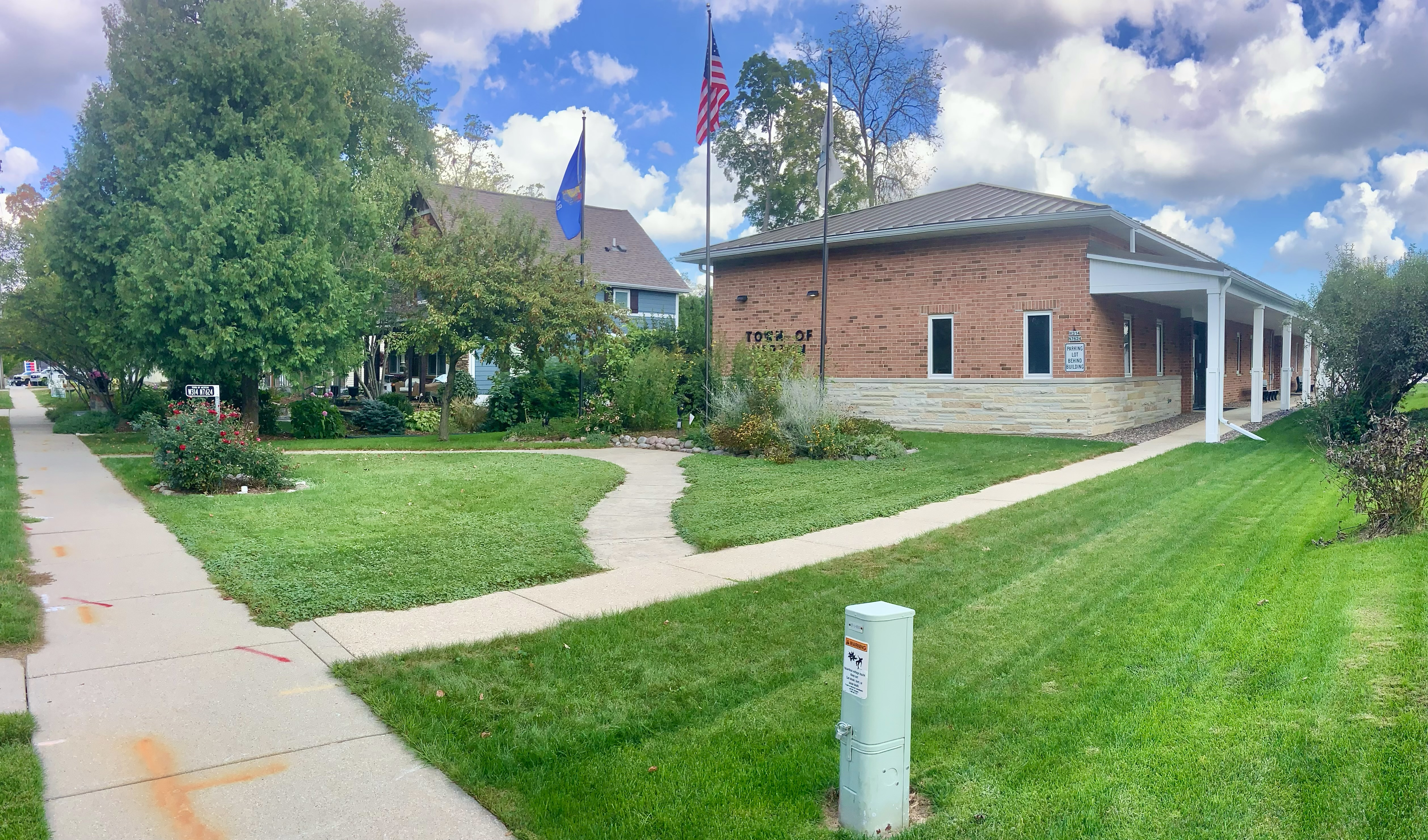
- Town hall

- Location in Waukesha County and the state of Wisconsin.
- Coordinates: 43°8′29″N 88°18′42″W
- Country: United States
- State: Wisconsin
- County: Waukesha

Area
  - Total: 28.3 sq mi (73.2 km^{2})
  - Land: 25.8 sq mi (66.7 km^{2})
  - Water: 2.5 sq mi (6.5 km^{2})

Population (2020)
  - Total: 8,277
  - Density: 321/sq mi (124/km^{2})
- Time zone: UTC-6 (Central (CST))
  - Summer (DST): UTC-5 (CDT)
- Website: Official website

Merton is a town in Waukesha County, Wisconsin, United States; before Wisconsin statehood, it was called Warren. The population was 8,277 at the 2020 census. The town surrounds the villages of Chenequa and Merton. The unincorporated communities of Camp Whitcomb, Monches, and North Lake are in the town and the unincorporated community of Stone Bank is partially in the town. The pioneer Swedish-American settlement of New Upsala was also at one time located within Merton.

== Geography ==
According to the United States Census Bureau, the town has a total area of 28.3 square miles (73.2 km^{2}) of which 25.7 square miles (66.7 km^{2}) is land and 2.5 square miles (6.5 km^{2}) (8.88%) is water.

Merton is located in the Lake Country area of Waukesha County.

== Demographics ==
Historical population
Census	Pop.	Note	%±
1980	6,025		—
1990	6,430		6.7%
2000	7,988		24.2%
2010	8,338		4.4%
2020	8,277		−0.7%

As of the census of 2000, there were 7,988 people, 2,706 households, and 2,278 families residing in the town. The population density was 310.3 people per square mile (119.8/km^{2}). There were 2,932 housing units at an average density of 113.9 per square mile (44.0/km^{2}). The racial makeup of the town was 98.65% White, 0.15% Black or African American, 0.13% Native American, 0.50% Asian, 0.05% Pacific Islander, 0.20% from other races, and 0.33% from two or more races. 1.01% of the population were Hispanic or Latino of any race.

There were 2,706 households, of which 43.2% had children under the age of 18 living with them, 77.9% were married couples living together, 4.2% had a female householder with no husband present, and 15.8% were non-families. 13.0% of all households were made up of individuals, and 4.7% had someone living alone who was 65 years of age or older. The average household size was 2.95 and the average family size was 3.26.

In the town, the population was spread out, with 30.6% under the age of 18, 5.3% from 18 to 24, 28.5% from 25 to 44, 27.0% from 45 to 64, and 8.6% who were 65 years of age or older. The median age was 38 years. For every 100 females, there were 105.4 males. For every 100 females age 18 and over, there were 102.7 males.

The median income for a household in the town was $78,937, and the median income for a family was $83,331. Males had a median income of $54,438 versus $35,672 for females. The per capita income for the town was $34,633. About 1.0% of families and 1.3% of the population were below the poverty line, including 1.3% of those under age 18 and 2.2% of those aged 65 or over.

== Notable people ==
- Ephraim Beaumont, Wisconsin State Representative, lived in the Town of Merton
- Chester Dempsey, Wisconsin State Senator, was born in the Town of Merton
- Judson Hall, Wisconsin State Representative, was born in the Town of Merton
- James Barney Marsh, bridge designer, was born in the Town of Merton
