= Alice Higinbotham =

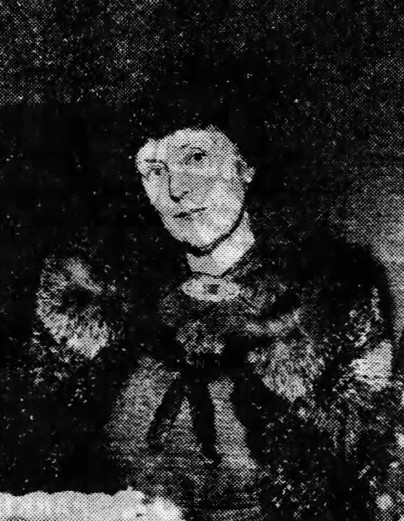
- Alice Higinbotham Patterson pictured in the Chicago Tribune, 1935
- Born: December 20, 1880; Chicago, Illinois, U.S.
- Died: December 6, 1966 (aged 85)
- Spouse: Joseph Medill Patterson (m. 1902; div. 1938)
- Children: 3, including Alicia Patterson

Alice Higinbotham (December 20, 1880 – December 6, 1966) was a figure in early 20th-century Chicago social life and charitable service. She was the first wife of Joseph Medill Patterson, and mother of Elinor, Josephine, and Alicia Patterson.

== Biography ==
Alice Higinbotham was born on December 20, 1880, in Chicago, Illinois to Harlow Niles Higinbotham (a business partner of Marshall Field and President of the 1893 World's Columbian Exposition) and Rachel Davison Higinbotham. She, her sister Florence, and brothers Harlow D. and Harry were raised Episcopalian and the girls studied at Miss Porter's School in Farmington, Connecticut. As a child, she accompanied her parents on a 1891 trip to visit Europe in planning for the 1893 World's Columbian Exposition. The family lived in a luxurious Douglas, Chicago estate at the intersection of 29th Street and Michigan Avenue that included a library, music room, conservatory, ballroom, stables and a carriage house, complete electric lighting, two elevators, and an entrance mosaic by Tiffany.

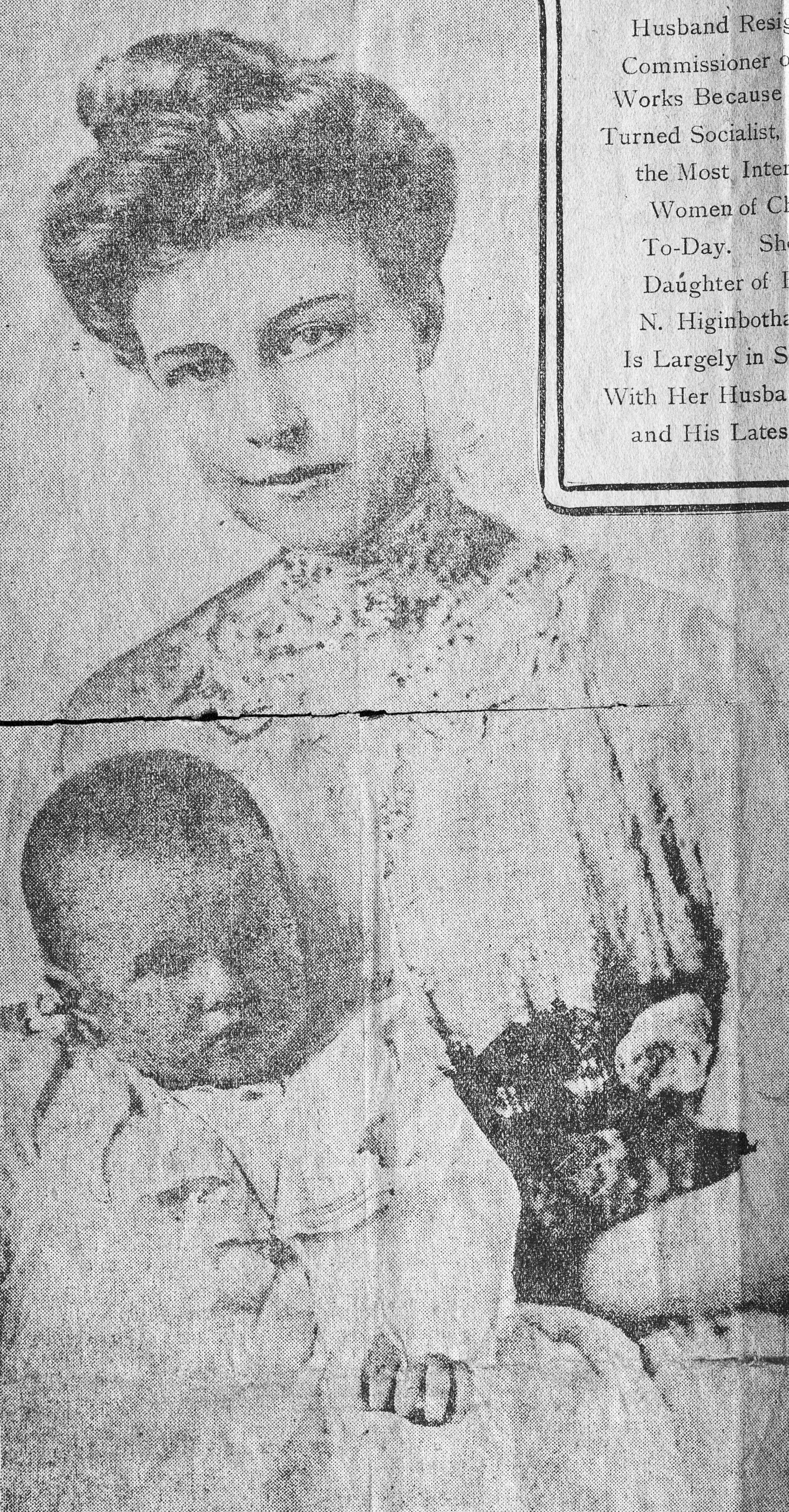
Alice H. Patterson with daughter Elinor, circa 1904

Beginning in her youth, Alice was involved in high society life. Through her father's role in the Chicago World's Fair, Alice served on the receiving committee of the Woman's Building at age thirteen. Shortly before her eighteenth birthday in 1898, she made her formal debut at a reception to which 800 people were invited. Alice's engagement was announced in June 1902, and she married Joseph Medill Patterson on November 19 the same year. Together they had three daughters; Elinor in 1903, Alicia in 1906, and Josephine in 1913. Alice was a member of the board of the Children's Memorial Hospital, and the Chicago Lying-In Hospital for labor and delivery, which affiliated with the University of Chicago in 1927. She was also an active supporter of women's suffrage, serving as a member of the executive committee of the North Side Branch of the Illinois Equal Suffrage League. She was also a member of the Garden Club of Lake Forest, and a member (and later president) of the Antiquarian Society of the Art Institute of Chicago. Her activism for women's suffrage included letter-writing campaigns, poll-manning, and direct visitation of politicians; she also chaired the social committee for planning suffrage entertainment, and participated in Progressive Party gatherings. Alice fund-raised during World War I, serving as a patroness at a 1917 Military Ball. She served multiple terms as president of Chicago's Parents' League, was a member of the Illinois Women's Athletic Club, and vice president of the Fortnightly of Chicago. Her name was known enough to be used in advertisements; her praise was quoted in a 1929 promotion for Hartman's Furniture and Carpet Company.

Alice divorced Joseph Patterson on June 10, 1938, charging him with desertion since 1928; Alice was granted the divorce uncontested. Patterson had fathered a son with Mary King in 1923; he married King on July 5, 1938. At the time of her death in 1966, she was survived by two daughters, five grandchildren, and six great-grandchildren.
