= Jennie Coldwell Nixon =

American educator (1839–1917)

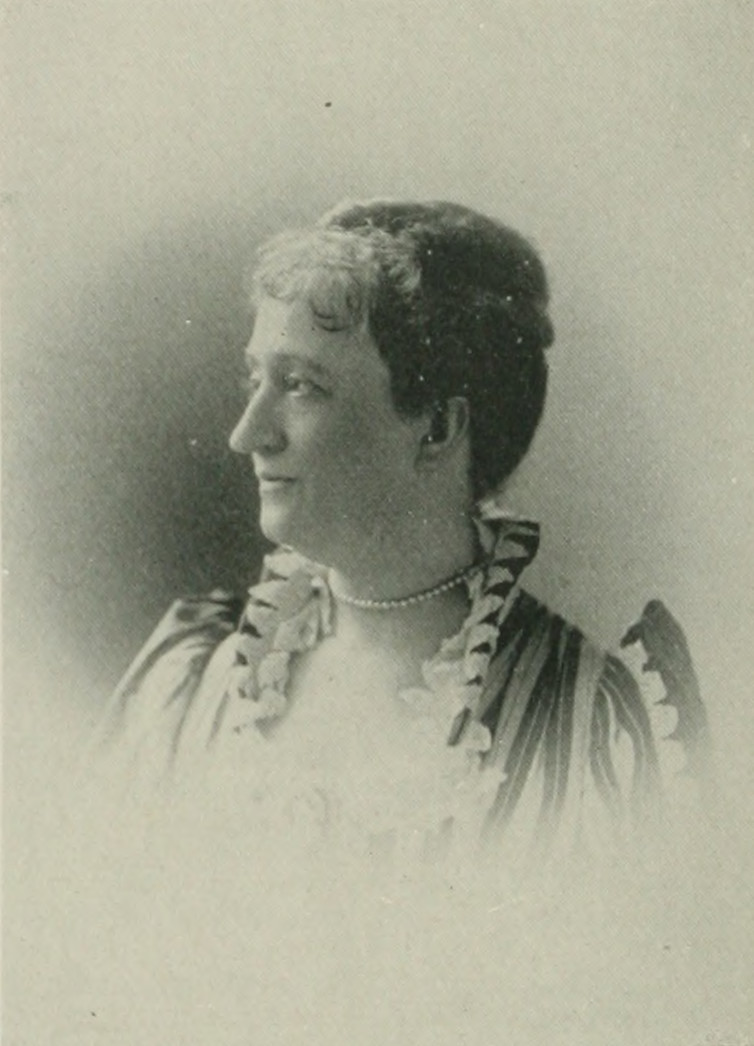
- Portrait photo from A Woman of the Century
- Born: Jennie Coldwell; March 3, 1839; Shelbyville, Tennessee, U.S.
- Died: January 7, 1917 (aged 77); Oconomowoc, Wisconsin, U.S.
- Resting place: La Belle Cemetery
- Occupation: Professor
- Known for: first woman to receive the Carnegie pension for teachers
- Spouse: John Nixon
- Children: 2

Academic work
- Discipline: English literature
- Institutions: H. Sophie Newcomb Memorial College

Jennie Coldwell Nixon (1839-1917) was an American educator. She was the first woman to receive the Carnegie pension for teachers.

== Early life ==
Jennie Coldwell was born in Shelbyville, Tennessee, March 3, 1839. She descended on her mother's side from the English Northcotes and Loudons, and on her father's side from the Campbells and Caldwells of Scotland. Jennie's father, John Campbell Coldwell, was born January 8, 1791, in Hawkins County, Tennessee, and removed with his father, Ballard Coldwell, and family to Bedford County, Tennessee January 1, 1807. John Campbell Coldwell served two campaigns under Gen. Andrew Jackson , one against the Creek Indians, in which he participated in the battle of Horseshoe Bend, and the other against the British, in which he was a participant at the battle of New Orleans, January 8, 1815. After this campaign, he settled at Shelbyville, and was a merchant from 1818 to 1843, at which time he retired to his farm, where he died July 17, 1867. Jennie's mother was Jane Northcott, born in Fleming County, Kentucky, the daughter of Rev. Benjamin Northcott. Jennie had two brothers and one sister; one brother, Thomas, served as Attorney-General of Tennessee.

Reared in affluence on the old family estate, she exhibited a fondness for books at an early age.

== Career ==
At the age of 18, she married John Nixon (born in Scotland), a prominent cotton factor of New Orleans, and up to the last few years of her life, she made that city her permanent home. The following year was spent in foreign travel, which aided her intellectual growth by developing a taste for art and cultivating a poetic instinct.

Nixon spent the later years of the civil war in the Island of Jersey. Recalled to the U.S. by the war, which swept away her inheritance, and widowed in 1870, she determined to adopt teaching as a profession. She again went abroad, with her two young children, and devoted herself to study for several years in France and Germany, in order to acquire a more thorough knowledge of general literature before attempting to teach her own. On her return, she entered her chosen career, filling important positions in different schools of the South. She also gave lectures to literary club and engaged in literary work.

In the World Cotton Centennial, held in New Orleans in 1884-85, she represented Louisiana in the department of woman's work, and in the following year, she was appointed president of the same department in the North, Central and South American Exposition (1886).

When the H. Sophie Newcomb Memorial College for young women was founded, in New Orleans, in 1887, she was invited to the chair of English literature. During all these years, Nixon continued to prepare herself for her increasing responsibilities by continuous study and reading, by summer courses at harvard and Oxford, and by extensive travel on the continent. She became the center of the intellectual life in New Orleans. Largely through her instrumentalities, the Newcomb College became an important factor in the educational development of the South. She held this position for many years until she retired in 1907, on a Carnegie pension, the first woman in the U.S. to whom this honor was awarded.

She spent some time in the vicinity of Geneva, Switzerland every year after her retirement from Sophie Newcomb College.

In later life, she contributed many articles to leading periodicals on the topics of the day, essays in lighter vein, fiction and verse. Of special note was her scholarly set of lectures entitled "Immortal Lovers" which were delivered before the Woman's Club of New Orleans. Her style, though forcible and vivid, was at the same time flexible and graceful. As a poet, she showed a sympathy with Nature.

== Personal life ==
Maud Howe Elliott's Atalanta in the South: A Romance contains a description of "The Cabin", Nixon's home in New Orleans.

The Nixon's had two children, a daughter, Lenoir, and a son, Richard

== Death and legacy ==
Jennie Coldwell Nixon died of heart disease at her daughter's home, Minnewoc, in Oconomowoc, Wisconsin, on January 7, 1917. Interment was at La Belle Cemetery, Oconomowoc, Wisconsin.

The Jennie Caldwell Nixon Debating Prize and the George Award for Best Debate in Jennie C. Nixon Preliminaries were named in her honor at the H. Sophie Newcomb Memorial College for Women.
