= John S. Rockwell =

- Born: John Star Rockwell; March 25, 1810; New York, U.S.
- Died: February 3, 1863 (aged 52); Oconomowoc Wisconsin, U.S.
- Resting place: La Belle Cemetery Oconomowoc Wisconsin, U.S.
- Occupations: Lawyer, Politician, Judge,
- Known for: Founder of the City of Oconomowoc
- Notable work: Built the first lumber mills, establish the first bank and general store. Built the first hotel and donated land for all of the early churches.
- Political party: Democratic
- Spouse: Lavinia Hard (m. 1839 - 1852) Anna P. Bradley (m. 1854 - 1863)
- Children: 5
- Parent: Ard Rockwell (father) Elizabeth Shaw Rockwell (mother)
- Relatives: David Henry Rockwell (brother)

John Star Rockwell (March 25, 1810 - February 3, 1863) is known as the "father of Oconomowoc." He is responsible for building many of the city's original foundations: a grist mill, the first store, hotel, fire department, elementary school, and library. Rockwell also donated land for the community's churches. In January 1856, John and his brother D. Henry were among the trustees who obtained a state charter for the Oconomowoc Seminary, an Episcopalian female seminary for the Diocese of Wisconsin; the Oconomowoc Seminary was later called Bord du Lac.

== Personal life ==
Rockwell married his first wife Lavinia Hard in 1839 but she died in 1852. Rockwell re married two years later to Anna P. Bradley. Rockwell had 3 children with Lavinia and had 2 children with Anna. In many of these enterprises, he worked with his youngest brother, D. Henry Rockwell (who served in the Wisconsin State Assembly); John was the eldest. In 1859, their parents celebrated their 50th wedding anniversary at their home in Elkhorn, Wisconsin; at that time, John was described as the eldest child, and D. Henry as the youngest (and unmarried).

== Death ==
Rockwell died on February 3, 1863, at the age of 52. He was buried at the La Belle Cemetery. His son Albert later became the mayor of Oconomowoc from 1879 - 1880.
