= Sensenbrenner (disambiguation) =

Jim Sensenbrenner (born 1943) is an American politician and former member of the United States House of Representatives.

Sensenbrenner may also refer to:

== People ==
- F. Joseph Sensenbrenner Jr. (born 1948), American politician and former mayor of Madison, second cousin of Jim Sensenbrenner
- Jack Sensenbrenner (1902–1991), American politician and former mayor of Columbus

== Other uses ==
- Sensenbrenner syndrome
- Sensenbrenner Park, park in Columbus

== See also ==
- J. Leslie Sensenbrenner House, home in Neenah, Wisconsin
- Border Protection, Anti-terrorism and Illegal Immigration Control Act of 2005, or the "Sensenbrenner Bill"
