= Harlow Niles Higinbotham =

American businessman (1838-1919)

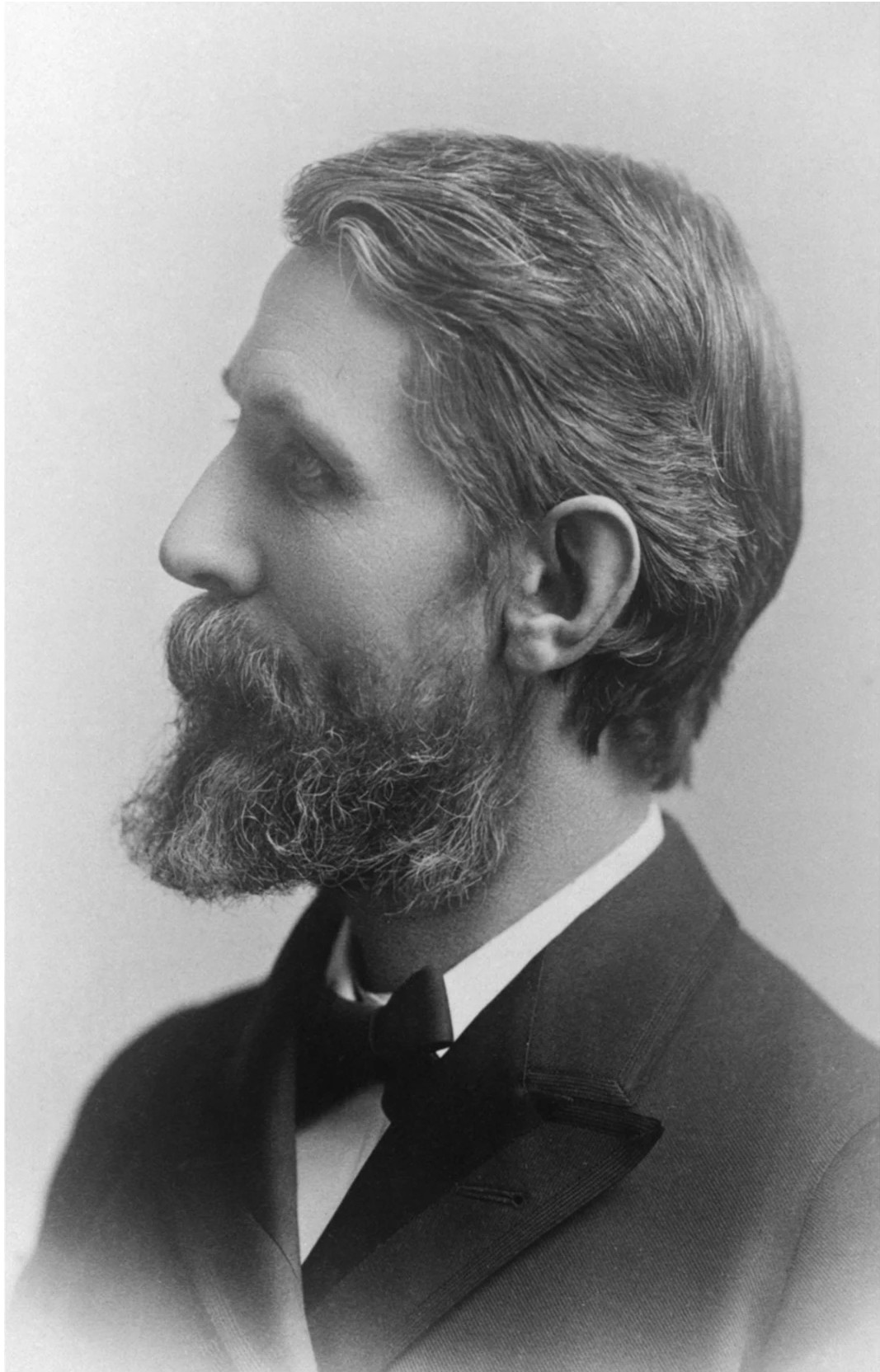
Harlow Niles Higinbotham, c. 1893

Harlow Niles Higinbotham (October 10, 1838 – April 18, 1919) was an American businessman who became a president of Marshall Field & Co. and President of the Board of Directors of the 1893 World's Columbian Exposition in Chicago, Illinois.

== Early life and education ==
Harlow Niles Higinbotham was born in Joliet, Illinois, on October 10, 1838, to Henry Dumont Higinbotham and Rebecca Wheeler Higinbotham. The Higinbothams had come to the United States originally from Holland, by way of England and Barbados. Harlow was raised with two brothers and three sisters. His father Henry operated water-powered sawmills, and kept cattle and hogs.

At age 20, he started his own crockery line. He also worked as a clerk and cashier in a bank. He attended Universalist Lombard College at Galesburg, Illinois. In 1860 he moved to Chicago, Illinois, where he took business classes. During the American Civil War, he served in West Virginia as captain of the 'Kelley Guards,' and fought in Virginia and Tennessee.

== Career ==
In Chicago, Higinbotham worked as bookkeeper for the firm Cooley & Leiter (later Field, Leiter & Co.) He married Rachel Deborah Davison (1843–1909), his childhood sweetheart and neighbor, in 1865, and together they had two sons and four daughters (two of whom who survived infancy), including Alice Higinbotham. They lived in a mansion at 2838 S. Michigan Avenue designed by Francis M. Whitehouse. By 1880, Higinbotham had become a partner of Marshall Field & Co in part due to his effectiveness in reestablishing the company after losses from the 1871 Great Chicago Fire. During this time he worked out of the Rand McNally Building.

After being unanimously elected as the President of Board of Directors of the World's Columbian Exposition in 1892 alongside the President of the World's Columbian Commission, Thomas Wetherill Palmer, Higinbotham served as chair of the Council of Administration overseeing the event. Higinbotham also served on the Finance, Ways and Means, and Foreign Exhibits committees, and as a member of the Bureau of Admissions and Collections. On October 21, 1892, Higinbotham walked in the Grand Military Procession at Washington Park before a crowd of 200,000. He bestowed commemorative medals on Thomas W. Palmer, to be presented to the Vice President of the United States (then Levi P. Morton). When United States President Grover Cleveland visited the Exposition on April 30, 1893, Higinbotham was his dinner host.

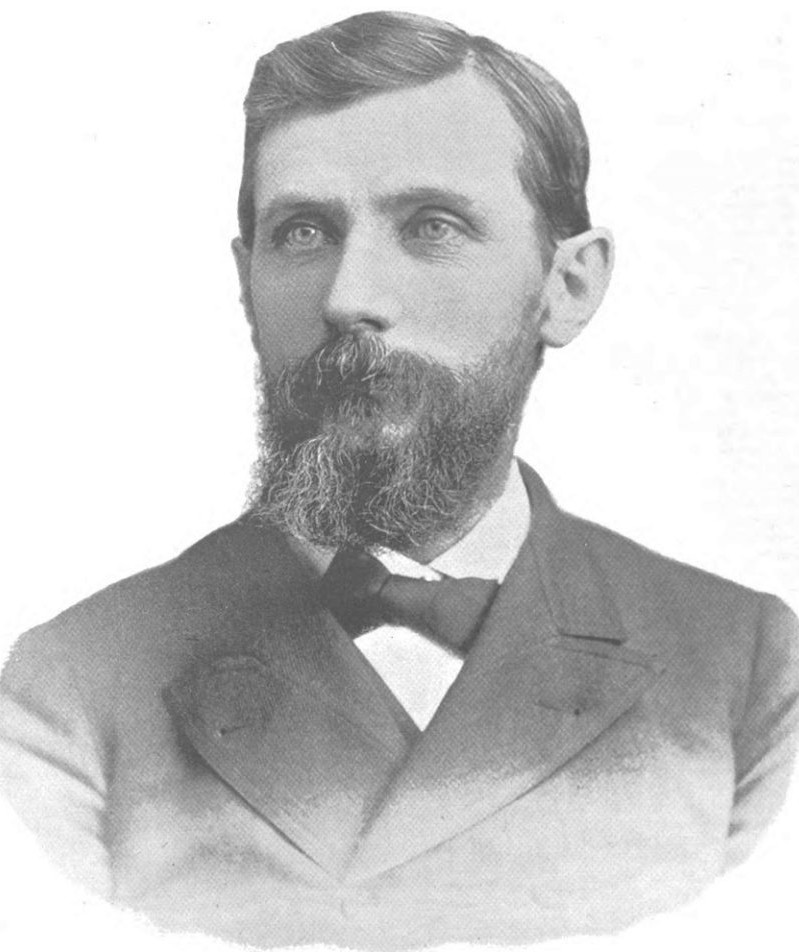
Harlow Niles Higinbotham, circa 1891

From 1894 to 1906, Higinbotham served as a trustee of Northwestern University in Evanston, Illinois. In 1897, United States President William McKinley offered to make him United States Ambassador to France, but Higinbotham declined. In 1898, he became the second President of the Field Museum of Natural History, a position that he held until 1908. He purchased collections from the Exposition to give to the Field Museum, including the George Frederick Kunz Gemology and Mineralogy Library and Tiffany gems. He had retired from Marshall Field & Co. in 1902, and busied himself leading philanthropy efforts for Hahnemann Hospital, the Newsboys' and Bootblacks' Association, the Home for Incurables (affiliated with the University of Chicago since 1958), and the Municipal Tuberculosis Sanitarium.

== Death ==
Higinbotham died at age 80 on April 18, 1919, after being struck by an ambulance in New York City. In 1920 the book Harlow Niles Higinbotham, A Memoir, with Brief Autobiography and Extracts from Speeches and Letters was published, written and edited by Harriet Monroe.
