= Oconomowoc Lake, Wisconsin =

- Village
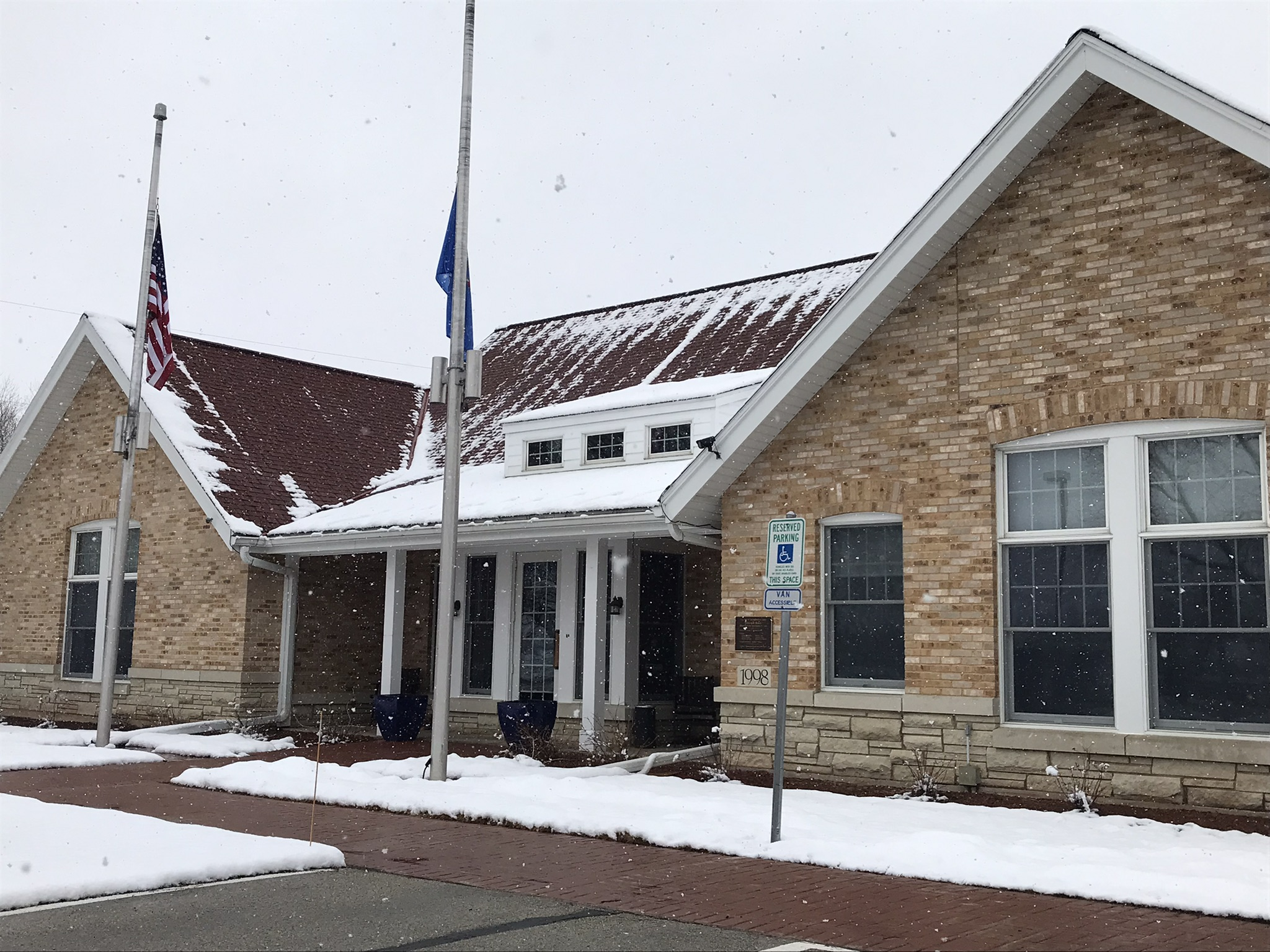
- Oconomowoc Lake Village Hall

- Location of Oconomowoc Lake in Waukesha County, Wisconsin.
- Coordinates: 43°5′23″N 88°27′38″W
- Country: United States
- State: Wisconsin
- County: Waukesha
- Incorporated: 1959

Government
  - Type: Village Board
  - Village President: Michael Bickler

Area
  - Total: 3.24 sq mi (8.38 km^{2})
  - Land: 1.92 sq mi (4.97 km^{2})
  - Water: 1.32 sq mi (3.41 km^{2})
- Elevation: 899 ft (274 m)

Population (2020)
  - Total: 566
  - Density: 312.6/sq mi (120.68/km^{2})
- Time zone: UTC-6 (Central (CST))
  - Summer (DST): UTC-5 (CDT)
- Zip: 53068
- Area code: 262
- FIPS code: 55-59300
- GNIS feature ID: 1570738

Oconomowoc Lake is a village in Waukesha County, Wisconsin, United States. The population was 566 at the 2020 census. Located just outside the City of Oconomowoc, the village includes the residential area encircling Oconomowoc Lake. The area became known as a summer retreat for wealthy residents of Milwaukee and Chicago at the turn of the 20th century and has remained one of the wealthiest municipalities in Wisconsin.

== History ==
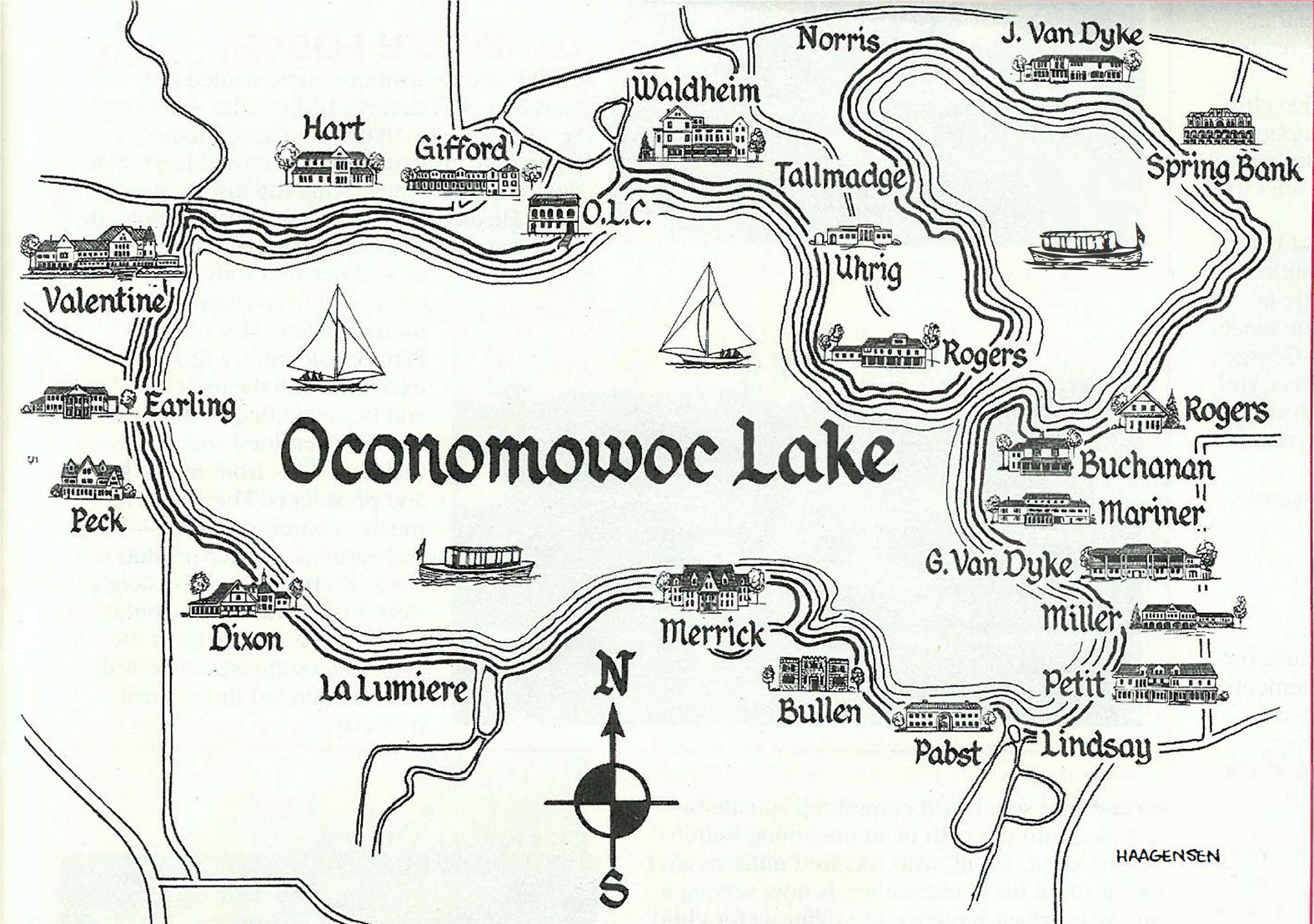
Family estates of Oconomowoc Lake before 1913

Development of the Oconomowoc lakeshore began in 1858 with the newly arrived Gifford family, who built a large summer home near the present-day site of the Oconomowoc Lake Club. Train service to Oconomowoc was initiated in the same year, allowing wealthy families from Chicago and Milwaukee to tour "Lake Country" on weekends. In 1878, the Giffords converted their property into the Gifford Hotel, a 100-acre (0.40 km^{2}) luxury summer retreat for Milwaukee's elite. When the hotel closed in 1910, it had lured many well-heeled families to build their own summer homes along the lakefront.

By 1910, prominent homeowners along the lakefront included Philip Armour of Chicago's meatpacking conglomerate, Frederick Pabst of the Pabst brewing family, and Frederick Miller of the Miller Brewing Company.

In 1934, the "Unofficial Village of Oconomowoc Lake" was created. The incorporation process started in 1952. The area was initially a part of the towns of Summit and Oconomowoc. The incorporation process was made final after going through a number of courts and a resident vote was held. 234 votes were taken with 192 voting in favor of incorporation.

== Geography ==
Oconomowoc Lake is located at 43°5′23″N 88°27′38″W (43.089780, −88.460587).

According to the United States Census Bureau, the village has a total area of 3.30 square miles (8.55 km^{2}), of which 1.98 square miles (5.13 km^{2}) is land and 1.32 square miles (3.42 km^{2}) is water.

== Demographics ==
Historical population
Census	Pop.	Note	%±
1960	414		—
1970	599		44.7%
1980	524		−12.5%
1990	493		−5.9%
2000	564		14.4%
2010	595		5.5%
2020	566		−4.9%
U.S. Decennial Census

=== 2010 census ===
As of the census of 2010, there were 595 people, 232 households, and 177 families residing in the village. The population density was 300.5 inhabitants per square mile (116.0/km^{2}). There were 302 housing units at an average density of 152.5 per square mile (58.9/km^{2}). The racial makeup of the village was 97.3% White, 0.3% African American, 0.3% Native American, 0.8% Asian, 0.2% Pacific Islander, 0.7% from other races, and 0.3% from two or more races. Hispanic or Latino of any race were 1.8% of the population.

There were 232 households, of which 28.0% had children under the age of 18 living with them, 66.8% were married couples living together, 4.7% had a female householder with no husband present, 4.7% had a male householder with no wife present, and 23.7% were non-families. 19.0% of all households were made up of individuals, and 12.1% had someone living alone who was 65 years of age or older. The average household size was 2.53 and the average family size was 2.92.

The median age in the village was 50.7 years. 20.3% of residents were under the age of 18; 5.5% were between the ages of 18 and 24; 14.3% were from 25 to 44; 37.9% were from 45 to 64; and 22.2% were 65 years of age or older. The gender makeup of the village was 49.4% male and 50.6% female.

=== 2000 census ===
As of the census of 2000, there were 564 people, 208 households, and 178 families residing in the village. The population density was 298.4 people per square mile (115.2/km^{2}). There were 246 housing units at an average density of 130.2 per square mile (50.3/km^{2}). The racial makeup of the village was 98.23% White, 0.89% Asian, 0.35% from other races, and 0.53% from two or more races. Hispanic or Latino of any race were 0.71% of the population.

There were 208 households, out of which 34.6% had children under the age of 18 living with them, 81.7% were married couples living together, 1.4% had a female householder with no husband present, and 14.4% were non-families. 10.6% of all households were made up of individuals, and 5.3% had someone living alone who was 65 years of age or older. The average household size was 2.71 and the average family size was 2.93.

In the village, the population was spread out, with 25.2% under the age of 18, 4.3% from 18 to 24, 21.6% from 25 to 44, 37.6% from 45 to 64, and 11.3% who were 65 years of age or older. The median age was 44 years. For every 100 females, there were 107.4 males. For every 100 females age 18 and over, there were 101.0 males.

The median income for a household in the village was $112,760, and the median income for a family was $126,406. Males had a median income of $100,000 versus $51,875 for females. The per capita income for the village was $81,593. About 3.3% of families and 3.2% of the population were below the poverty line, including 5.5% of those under age 18 and none of those age 65 or over.

== Politics ==
Oconomowoc Lake is an overwhelmingly Republican jurisdiction. All GOP candidates for president and governor since the incorporation of the village have carried Oconomowoc Lake with over 70% of the vote. The highest total being the 92.37% won by Philip Kuehn in 1962. The best result for a Democratic candidate for president or governor is the 25.06% won by Joe Biden in 2020.

Oconomowoc Lake vote by party in presidential elections
Year	Democratic	Republican	Third Parties
2020	25.06% 111	72.91% 323	2.03% 9
2016	23.16% 82	71.19% 252	5.65% 20
2012	21.04% 81	78.44% 302	0.52% 2
2008	23.38% 94	75.37% 303	1.24% 5
2004	21.90% 92	77.38% 325	0.71% 3
2000	14.95% 55	83.15% 306	1.90% 7
1996	16.61% 52	83.39% 261	0.00% 0
1992	12.92% 46	70.51% 251	16.57% 59
1988	15.71% 49	84.29% 263	0.00% 0
1984	15.57% 45	83.74% 242	0.69% 2
1980	17.80% 55	81.88% 253	0.32% 1
1976	20.53% 62	79.14% 239	0.32% 1
1972	16.87% 55	80.98% 264	2.15% 7
1968	13.49% 39	85.12% 246	1.38% 4
1964	23.61% 68	76.39% 220	0.00% 0
1960	17.30% 50	82.70% 239	0.00% 0

Oconomowoc Lake vote by party in gubernatorial elections
Year	Democratic	Republican	Third Parties
2018	18.93% 67	79.94% 283	2.03% 4
2014	16.67% 55	83.33% 275	0.00% 0
2010	19.08% 62	80.92% 263	0.00% 0
2006	21.71% 76	76.86% 269	1.43% 5
2002	15.96% 49	79.48% 244	4.56% 14
1998	12.83% 33	88.17% 246	0.00% 0
1994	16.53% 41	83.47% 207	0.00% 0
1990	8.13% 17	91.87% 192	0.00% 0
1986	16.08% 32	83.92% 167	0.00% 0
1982	21.78% 49	76.89% 173	1.33% 3
1978	15.13% 36	84.03% 200	0.84% 2
1974	23.47% 46	76.02% 149	0.51% 1
1970	16.19% 40	83.81% 207	0.00% 0
1968	12.03% 35	87.97% 256	0.00% 0
1966	8.37% 19	91.63% 208	0.00% 0
1964	13.15% 38	86.85% 251	0.00% 0
1962	7.63% 18	92.37% 218	0.00% 0
1960	14.95% 42	85.05% 239	0.00% 0

== Education ==
It is in the Oconomowoc Area School District. Oconomowoc High School is the area high school.
