= Edwin Hurlbut =

American politician

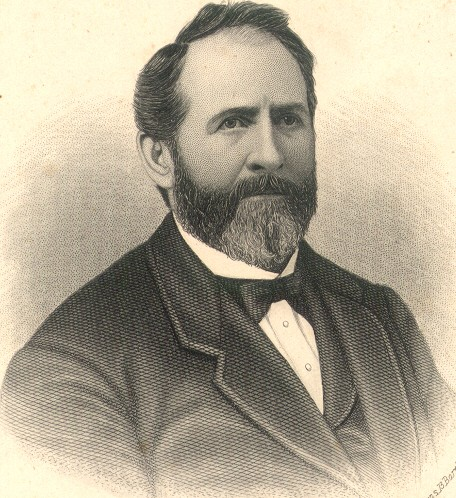
- Hon. Edwin Hurlbut
- Born: October 10, 1817; Newtown, Connecticut
- Died: November 28, 1905 (aged 88); Oconomowoc, Wisconsin
- Occupations: Lawyer, editor, politician and humanitarian
- Known for: Named the Republican Party
- Spouse: Catherine Chandler (m. 1840 - 1864) Mary H. Farner (m. 1864 - 1886) Margaret Spearing (m. 1886 - 1905)
- Children: 5

Mayor of Oconomowoc
- In office April 16, 1866 - April 21, 1867
- Preceded by: William Thompson
- Succeeded by: David Henry Rockwell

Hon. Edwin Hurlbut (October 10, 1817 – November 28, 1905) was an American lawyer, editor, politician and humanitarian and the Mayor of Oconomowoc from 1866 to 1867.

== Early years ==
Hurlbut was born in 1817 in Newtown, Connecticut, one of ten children of Philander and Julia Alma (Thomas) Hurlbut. The family moved to Bradford County, Pennsylvania when he was seven years old. They made the trip in a covered wagon, which they lived in until they cleared the land and built a log house on their one thousand acre homestead. During the three months of winter Hurlbut walked four miles a day through the forests to the nearest school, which was held in a log house. The remainder of the year he aided his father in cutting timber, digging up stumps and transforming the wilderness into meadow and grain field. Hurlbut credits these years of hard labor to his later in life gnarled and stiff fingers and joints, which he would state were not the fingers of either a lawyer nor editor. He also attributed these early life experiences to his determination to never shrink from a task.

Eight years later fifteen-year-old Hurlbut walked to New Jersey. He states that "...when quite a chunk of a boy, with light heart and elastic step I left home and walked over the mountains and through the woods to Newark, New Jersey, 100 miles distant, to visit Grandma Thomas." He lived there a year and then walked back to Pennsylvania to resume an occupation as a woodchopper.

== Early career ==
Hurlbut left the Pennsylvania homestead and went West to spend a short time in Eaton County, Michigan, but soon returned East to study law at Lodi, in Seneca County, New York, where he opened a law office and married Catherine Chandler in 1840. In 1842 he began studying law with David Wilmot in Towanda, Pennsylvania., and was admitted to the bar in 1847. He lost his home to foreclosure, so in 1848 he moved his family to Mason, Ingham County, Michigan. There he practiced law, was Postmaster, District Attorney, and judge advocate for the Michigan Militia. In April, 1850 he began an immigration to California, stopping in Milwaukee and then in Waukesha where his brother James and family were living. While visiting his brother he visited Oconomowoc and said, "That settled me. I thought it the most enchanting spot I had ever seen. If anyone could make a living there I could, I thought, and there I made my home and the California trip was abandoned." He began practicing law and was appointed attorney for the Milwaukee and Watertown Plankroad Company. It was in 1854 that his community position and influence gave him voice to call for a convention and name the Republican Party in the Madison, Wisconsin, in July, 1854.

== Family life ==
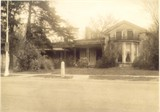
Edwin Hurlbut home, Oconomowoc, Wisconsin

Hurlbut was married to Catherine Chandler in 1840 and they had three daughters together, Julia Augusta, Henrietta Catherine and Kate Florabell. It was before the days of title insurance, and he lost the home he paid for to foreclosure, and traveled West looking for a new start with his wife Catherine. From nothing he built a fine reputation and income to support his family. His wife Catherine died in 1864 and he remarried the following December to Mary H. Farner of Waukesha. His third marriage was October 14, 1886 to Margaret (Margie) Spearing of New Orleans, Louisiana, and they had two daughters, Edwina (1887–1981) and Margie (1889–1979). His second family enjoyed the fruits of his youthful labors, and the daughters of his old age reflect that he and his young wife Margie (43 years his junior) had always appeared to be in love. She assisted him in the newspaper business, which she managed after his death for eighteen months until she sold it.

Local histories refer to Hurlbut as a self-made man, with a positive character, who became a lawyer, ranked among the best in the state. He was said to have had strong convictions. For example, he was a staunch prohibitionist and was never known to drink alcohol. He admitted, humorously, to have had one weakness — women.

== Religion ==
Hurlbut was originally a Baptist, and built, mainly at his own expense, a church for the Oconomowoc Baptist Society, at the cost of $5000.00. It was destroyed by a wind storm and never rebuilt. He later became a member of the Episcopalian church. He was also a 32nd degree Mason, a Knight Templar, a Noble of the Mystic Shrine, and held the office of Grand worthy Patriarch of the Grand division of the Sons of Temperance of the State of Wisconsin.

== Political life ==
In 1832, before political parties were divided over slavery, Hurlbut campaigned as a Jeffersonian Democrat with his father, for the election of Andrew Jackson's second term. His involvement in the anti-slavery and freesoil causes began while in the employ of David Wilmot in Towanda, Pennsylvania. Wilmot, who later became a U.S. Congressman in 1844 and introduced the Wilmot Proviso. After the following incident in Wilmot's office in 1842, Hurlbut became a freesoiler sympathizer, making speeches and traveling by wagon with a flag inscribed "Polk and the Tariff" in 1844, and advocated for Cass in 1848:

One day, while I was a student in Judge Wilmot's office, before he became a congressman, a man came in and retained to prosecute the leaders of a pro-slavery mob. The man was an abolitionist. He had undertaken to speak against the divine institution of slavery in a cross-roads schoolhouse at Wysock, about five miles from Towanda. The mob broke the windows, battered down the door, took the speaker out, gave him a coat of tar and feathers and rode him on a rail. He had some of the tar and feathers sticking to him when he came to the office. I shall never forget Mr. Wilmot's words on that occasion: "I will take your case willingly, sir, and do my utmost to bring these miscreants to justice. Any institution that engenders strife like this in its defense cannot live in a free country."

From Hurlbut's arrival in Wisconsin in 1850, he is known for the following:

- 1850 The first Wisconsin state Governor Nelson Dewey signed papers making Hurlbut a notary public.
- 1854 Called for political rally in Madison at which he helped develop a platform and named the new party Republican.
- 1857 & 1859 he campaigned for his friend Governor Alexander Randall, who was governor from 1858 to 1862.
- 1858 Appointed attorney for the Milwaukee, Beaver Dam & Baraboo Railroad.
- 1861 Colonel on Governor Randall's staff, actively recruiting soldiers for the Union army.
- 1866 Elected Mayor of Oconomowoc.
- 1869 He was elected to the Wisconsin State Assembly.
- 1870 He was appointed by Governor Fairchild to represent him at the International Conference on Penitentiary and Reformatory Discipline. The President of the conference was Rutherford B. Hayes.
- 1872 He was appointed as a delegate to the International Penitentiary Congress, which met in London, England.
- 1872 He supported Horace Greeley for president, who lost to U.S. Grant.
- 1873 He was elected District Attorney for Waukesha County under the Reform Party ticket.
- 1874 Member of the National Prison Congress held in St. Louis, Mo., and was made a trustee and on the criminal law reform committee.
- 1875 A trustee for National Prison Association in New York, on the committee for discharged convicts.
- 1875 Bought and edited the Wisconsin Free Press, which he maintained until his death in 1905, which was devoted to his interests in the Reform Party.
- through the years he held various Oconomowoc city offices including the clerk of the school board for twelve years.

Colonel Hurlbut was raised and active as a Jeffersonian Democrat, but just prior to the founding of the Republican Party in Madison, Wisconsin. in 1854, he wrote the platform for the American Party, which held that all political parties should be held by Americans born in this nation, make slavery a local issue, stand for prohibition, and rule it a state issue to make rivers and harbors navigable.

The publishing of the book Uncle Tom's Cabin in 1852, and the passing of the Kansas-Nebraska Act in March 1854 further polarized the nation concerning the expansion of slavery, but it was an incident in March 1854 which propelled the process of Hurlbut's naming the Republican party. This incident involved some citizens of Milwaukee, under the leadership of Sherman Booth the editor of The Free Democrat. This citizen group overpowered federal marshals who had apprehended Joshua Glover, a runaway slave, and freed Glover. Hurlbut states that while the excitement was at its height, he met with Mr. Booth and said to him:

"Booth, the times are now propitious for uniting all the elements in our complex political machinery to curb the power of this accursed institution of slavery."

"How are you to go about it Ed?" inquired Mr. Booth, a doleful look on his countenance.

"Issue a call for a people's mass convention and organize a new political party, with that as its main and, I may say, only object," I replied.

"Write your call," said Mr. Booth, pushing a block of paper and a pencil over to me as I sat at the editorial table.

The remainder of the above conversation expressed Hurlbut's conviction that a July rally in Madison could crystallize anti-slavery sentiment and carry the state. Hurlbut actively promoted the convention and Sherman Booth printed the convention notice in his newspaper for four weeks prior to the rally.

Hurlbut was the only person at the rally from Waukesha County among the crowd of 3,000. He was appointed to the resolution committee, which a)pronounced against the extension of slavery into the territories, b)against the fugitive slave law, and c)proposed that slavery should be confined to its present limits. This platform was adopted by a unanimous vote. When the question arose of breaking away from the old parties arose, Hurlbut says he feared the whole thing would come to an end unless something radical was done. He quickly wrote and offered an amendment which resolved that all political differences would be put aside until the resolutions were accomplished. His resolution was adopted, and then came the call for a name of the new party. Hurlbut then stated:

Mr. chairman, I said, addressing that officer, 'I recall that in my early manhood, as I came across its threshhold [sic] filled with hopes of possible achievement, the party of liberality, the party of the people was known as the Republican-Democrat party. That was the party of Andrew Jackson. The party of Jefferson was known as the Republican party. Let us, sir, christen this child of promise after the party of Thomas Jefferson, that sterling representative of true Americanism.' "The name caught the crowd, cheer upon cheer swept over the multitude, and the new organization was, by a unanimous vote denominated the Republican party.

— Edwin Hurlbut, R.F. Howard, Wisconsin Free Press, 14 September 1903

He was a delegate to the first national Republican convention, which nominated Gen. John C. Fremont for the presidency in 1856, with the slogan "Free Soil, Free Men, Fremont". He continued to support the party which he had helped to form, by voice and pen until Grant's renomination in 1872, when he left the Republican ticket and supported Horace Greeley, who opposed president Grant's continuation of reconstruction. From that time he acted with the Democratic party until 1890, when he could not endorse its stand on the school question. He returned to the Republican party and continued to work for prison reform and prohibition.

== Who named the Republican Party? ==
Prior to the nineteenth century, the Quakers, Samuel Sewall, Samuel Hopkins and Jonathan Edwards (the younger), were lone voices against slavery. During the Second Great Awakening in the first part of the 19th century, convictions quickly changed with revivalist preachers, including Charles Finney, decrying the evil of slavery. By the 1840s an anti-slavery and abolitionist movement had gained enough momentum for the establishment of political groups such as the Liberty Party and Free Soil Party. It was in 1842 that Edwin Hurlbut had his experience in Wilmot's office (see above). The Wilmot Proviso was in 1846, Harriet Tubman began her work, and the new Fugitive Slave Act of 1850 further propelled the slavery controversy. The publication in 1852 of Harriot Beecher Stowe's Uncle Tom's Cabin, the publication of Appeal of the Independent Democrats, and the passing of the Kansas-Nebraska Act in early 1854 further stoked the fires against slavery. Prior to the Joshua Glover case, which motivated Hurlbut to call for the convention in Madison (see above), there were at least three similar runaway slave rescue situations since 1850, namely Shadrach Minkins, the Jerry Rescue, and Anthony Burns. The fullness of time had come for a political party which would unite anti-slavery and abolitionists in a powerful political force.

In abolitionist, Liberty, and Free Soil circles the name 'republican' had been bandied around for a number of years, with even Horace Greeley using the term as early as 1852, and is credited to christening the name republican in 1854. In addition, Israel Washburn, U.S. congressman from Maine, used the name Republican in reference to forming an anti-slavery party, there were private meetings in Crawfordsville, Iowa, Ripon, Wisconsin, Exeter, New Hampshire, and the convention in Jackson, Michigan, which all claim to have first named the party republican in 1854. Research completed by Mrs. Page Johnson in 1976, agrees with the column by R.F. Howard in 1903, that Edwin Hurlbut named the Republican Party in Madison, WI., July 13, 1854. Included in Mrs. Johnson's article is a photo of the Republican float in the bi-centennial parade in Oconomowoc in 1976, on which is displayed a replica of the handbill which Hurlbut distributed in June 1854, and added signage, "Hurlbut Named Party Republican".

Later Alvan E. Bovay also claimed to have named the Republican Party in Ripon, Wisconsin, and is given credit and recognition for it by sign and literature, at the Little White Schoolhouse monument in Ripon. A statement to the effect of Bovay naming the party was made in 1900, to which Col. Hurlbut responded by stating that he and Sherman Booth issued the call for a mass convention to establish a new political party without knowledge or reference to the meeting in Ripon. He further clarified his assessment of the meeting in Ripon:

The Ripon meeting was simply that of a little knot of "nickers", and nothing whatever grew out of it except perhaps, the satisfaction of being furnished an opportunity to meet and say unpleasant things about the other people. It was doubtless, well meant, but produced no effect.

— Edwin Hurlbut,

Two years later Hurlbut further defines the differences between the small inconspicuous meeting in Ripon, and the people's mass convention in Madison:

That was not a Republican meeting that was held in Ripon. It was a gathering of a few Abolitionists, whose plans and principles ran along altogether different lines. It was not their purpose to hold slavery in check, but to abolish it entirely--to get rid of it by fair means or foul. They were either the active operators, or the supporters of the so-called 'underground railway' which had a northern terminal at Waukesha and Milwaukee. They did not pretend to select a party name at the Ripon meeting. The excuse for this omission, as given by Mr. Bovay many years later, when the Republican party became famous, was that he wanted to have the name come from a more important place than the little inland town of Ripon.

— Edwin Hurlbut, R.F. Howard, Wisconsin Free Press, September 14, 1903

Without Colonel Hurbut's call to this "more important place", the Republican Party would not have been born and christened in Wisconsin the summer of 1854. He wrote out the notice for a July convention, which was printed for four weeks in Sherman Booth's Milwaukee Free Democrat paper and other newspapers in the state. Three thousand delegates voted on the capital building steps in Madison on Hurlbut's proposed name of "Republican". Before this convention these delegates had been Whigs, Free Soil Party, Conservative Democrats, and members of the American Party. This event made the state Capital Square the birthplace of the party.

Because the name "Republican" had been in common usage among anti-slavery and abolitionist groups throughout the North, one cannot attribute that word to any one person. There were likely many small groups, like the aforementioned ones in Iowa, Michigan, Wisconsin and New Hampshire, who favored the name. These isolated groups were influencing and directing, and may have called themselves "Republican", but did not name the party. As pointed out by Colonel Hurlbut, the Ripon meeting consisted of Abolitionists, and the Republican Party platform he helped develop in Madison was not pro-abolition, but anti-slavery and anti-slavery expansion. It took more than disconnected local small groups with a common name and idea, but a notable person's issue of a statewide call for a convention, followed by hard work and presenting the name "Republican" to the people. This was the effort of Hurlbut, and the fruit of his effort was the platform and naming of the Republican Party on July 13, 1854, in Madison, Wisconsin.

== Death ==
Hurlbut died on November 28, 1905, at his home in Oconomowoc, Wisconsin. He had been in poor health.
