= D. Henry Rockwell =

Miller; member of the Wisconsin State Assembly

Member of the Wisconsin State Assembly
- In office January 10, 1849 - April 2, 1849

Mayor of Oconomowoc
- In office April 16, 1867 - April 21, 1868
- Preceded by: Edwin Hurlbut
- Succeeded by: James Alexander Henshall
- Born: David Henry Rockwell; July 27, 1823; Otsego New York, U.S.
- Died: May 11, 1899 (aged 75); Columbus Wisconsin, U.S.
- Occupations: miller and Politician
- Title: Member of the Wisconsin state Assembly 2nd Wisconsin Legislature
- Term: 1849 - 1850
- Political party: Democratic
- Relatives: John S. Rockwell (brother)

David Henry Rockwell (July 27, 1823 - May 11, 1899) was a miller from Oconomowoc, Wisconsin (originally from New York) who served a single one-year term as a member of the Wisconsin State Assembly in 1849 (the 2nd Wisconsin Legislature).

== Background and personal life ==
He was born July 27, 1823, in Otsego, New York, son of Ard Starr Rockwell and Elizabeth Shaw. At the time of taking office (January 10, 1849), Rockwell described himself as 25 years old, his profession as "miller", originally from New York, and had been in Wisconsin four and one-half years. According to testimony given relative to a 1859 Wisconsin Supreme Court ruling, one or more Rockwells had been involved with a hydropower dam in Oconomowoc since 1837, and by the time of the 1856 filing of the case, David Henry Rockwell was one of the principals of the partnership or corporation involved. In 1859, his parents celebrated their 50th wedding anniversary at their home in Elkhorn, Wisconsin; at that time, D. Henry was described as the youngest child, and unmarried.

== Public service ==
In February 1847, when the first federal court session was held in the newly created Waukesha County, Rockwell served as an assistant United States Marshall. In this capacity, he was also one of the official certifiers of the results of the September 6, 1847, territorial election for Delegate to Congress. Rockwell was a Democrat; he succeeded fellow Democrat George M. Humphrey in the Assembly for the Waukesha County district which included Oconomowoc, Ottawa, Summit and Warren, and would be in turn succeeded by John E. Gallagher, another Democrat. In May 1854, he was appointed deputy postmaster for Oconomowoc. As late as 1863, he remained loyal to and active in the Democratic Party.

== After the Legislature ==
In 1855, Rockwell and two associates began construction of a new flour mill in Oconomowoc; construction was completed in 1857, and he would retain an interest in it until October 1875, when he sold his interest to his then partners.

In January 1856, Rockwell was one of the trustees who obtained a state charter for the Oconomowoc Seminary, an Episcopalian female seminary for the Diocese of Wisconsin. In April 1867, Rockwell was among the organizers of an agricultural society for Oconomowoc, but it collapsed within ten years of its organization. He was a Freemason and held various offices in the Oconomowoc and Ellsworth lodges of that order from 1868 to 1872.

In 1879, a brick store building which burnt down as part of a disastrous fire in Oconomowoc is mentioned as having been built by Rockwell, but no date of its construction is given.

He died on May 11, 1899, and is buried in Hillside Cemetery in Columbus, Wisconsin.
