= Thomas Van Alyea =

American architect

- Born: Thomas Stevens Van Alyea; September 21, 1890; Princeville, Illinois, US
- Died: c. 1970 (aged 79–80); Milwaukee, Wisconsin, US
- Occupation: Architect
- Spouse: Margaret (née) Fitch
- Children: Daughter
- Parent(s): Thomas Van Alyea and Ellen (née) Stevens Moody
- Buildings: J. Leslie Sensenbrenner House
- Design: Knowllward

Thomas Stevens Van Alyea (September 21, 1890 - c. 1970) was a prominent architect, who designed homes and buildings in Wisconsin. He designed many of the buildings at St. John's Northwestern Military Academy in Delafield, Wisconsin.

== Early life ==
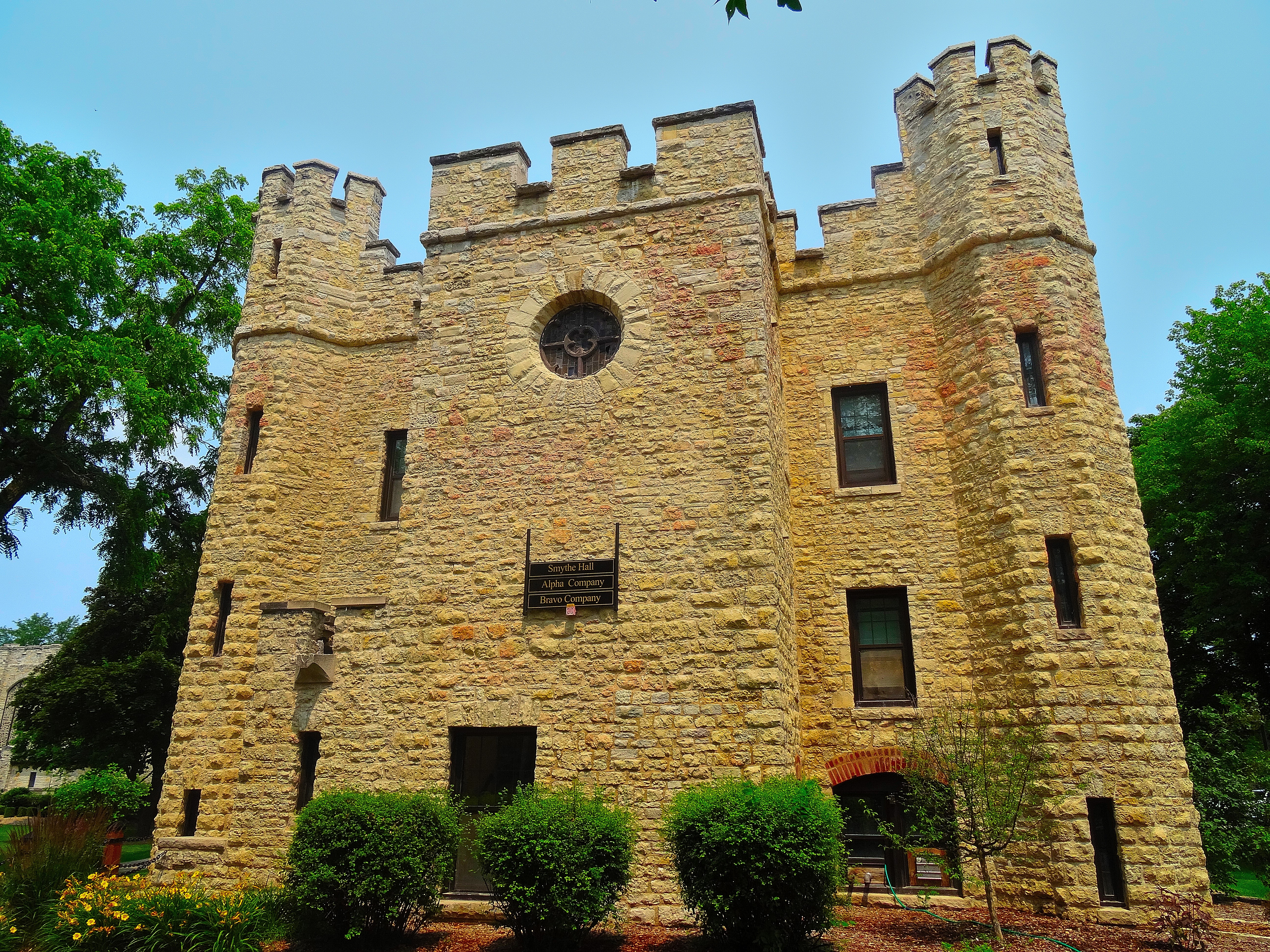
Dekoven Hall St. John's Military Academy

He was born September 21, 1890, in Princeville, Illinois, and his parents were Thomas Van Alyea and Ellen (née) Stevens Moody. He married Margaret (née) Fitch on June 24, 1925, and they had a daughter August 28, 1926.

== World War I ==
During World War I he entered military service as a 1st Sergeant on June 4, 1917. He was sent to Brest, France, and Romaine (Saône) and fought in the battles of St. Mihiel, and Meuse-Argonne, Argonne Forest. In 1918 he was cited for gallantry in action and he was awarded the Silver Star.

== Career ==
Thomas Van Alyea designed homes in the North Shore and upper east side areas of Milwaukee, Wisconsin. He designed buildings on the St. John's Military Academy grounds including Dekoven Hall. His architecture firm was called Courtney and White.

From 1939 to 1941 he renovated the J. Leslie Sensenbrenner House also known as the George Gaylord House. The home is located in Neenah, Winnebago County, Wisconsin, and it was added to the National Register of Historic Places in 2003.
