= Alvan E. Bovay =

American politician (1818–1903)

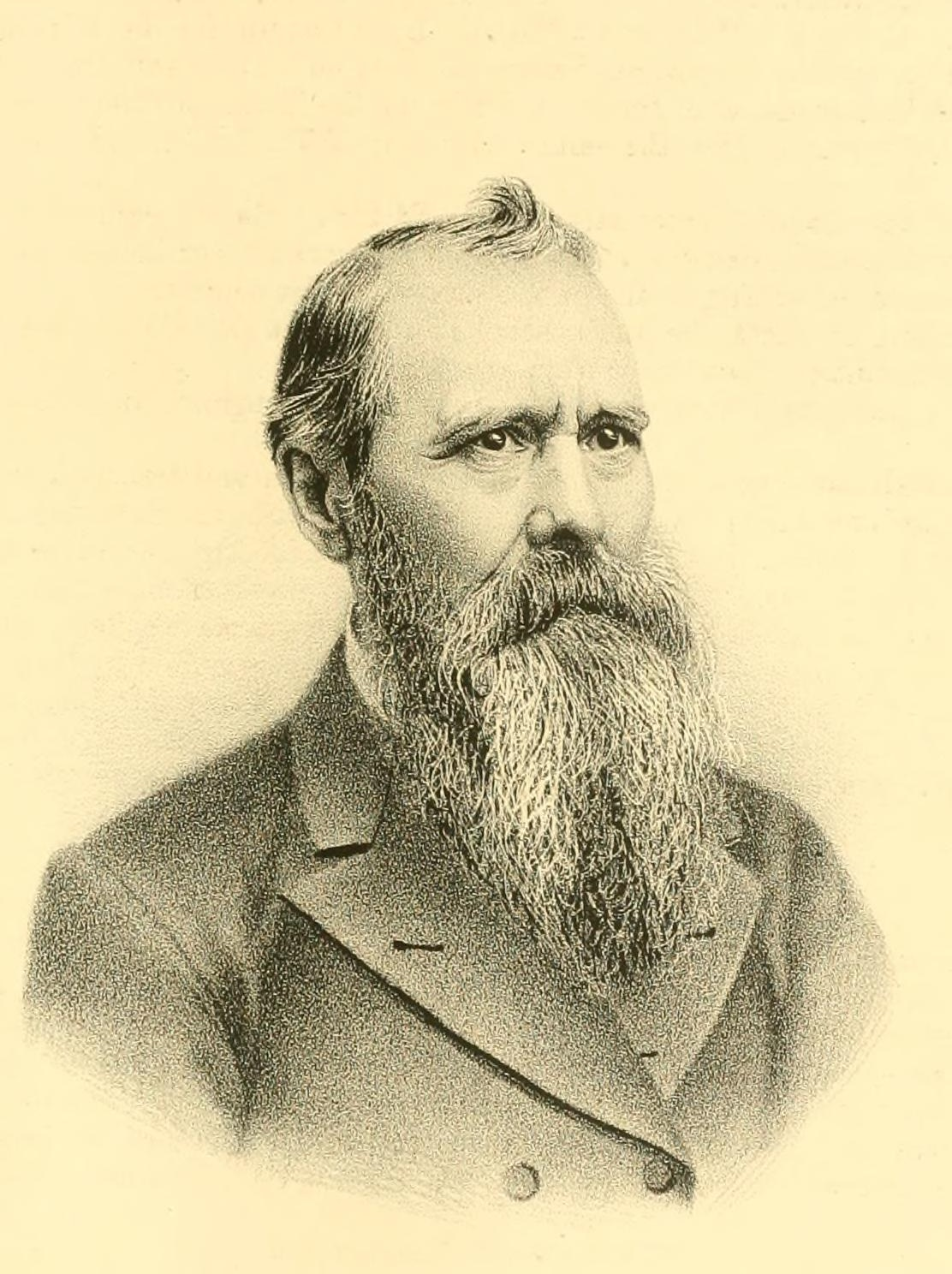
- From The History of Fond du Lac County, Wisconsin (1880)

Member of the Wisconsin State Assembly from the Fond du Lac 1st district
- In office January 3, 1859 – January 7, 1861
- Preceded by: Edmund L. Runals
- Succeeded by: Charles F. Hammond

Personal details
- Born: Alvan Earle Bovay; July 12, 1818 Adams, New York, U.S.
- Died: January 13, 1903 (aged 84) Santa Monica, California, U.S.
- Party: Republican; Prohibition
- Education: Norwich University

Military service
- Allegiance: United States
- Branch/service: United States Volunteers; Union Army
- Years of service: 1861–1863
- Rank: Major, USV
- Unit: 19th Reg. Wis. Vol. Infantry
- Battles/wars: American Civil War

Alvan Earle Bovay (July 12, 1818 – January 13, 1903) was an American politician and one of the founders of the Republican Party. He served in the Wisconsin State Assembly in 1859 and 1860, representing Fond du Lac County.

== Early life and education ==
Born in Adams, New York, Bovay later attended Norwich University, in the mountains of Vermont, where he also received military training.

After he had finished his studies, he taught mathematics and languages at several eastern institutions, including academies at Oswego and Glens Falls and the military college at Bristol, Pennsylvania.

== Career ==
He was admitted to the bar at Utica, New York, in July 1846. Four months later, in St. Luke's Episcopal Church in New York City, he married the daughter of Ransom Smith. He lived with his wife in New York, practiced law, and taught mathematics at the New York Commercial institute.

Four years later, Bovay moved with his family to Ripon, Wisconsin. It was then a new community that was less than a year old and had only 13 houses. He opened an office as an attorney and became a very respected and important member of the community. He created "Bovay's addition" to the town and helping to create Ripon College, which still has a wing called "Bovay Hall," among his other contributions to the town. The community flourished and gained many new members from different walks of life, which turned the town into a hotbed of politics. Most settlers in Ripon on the hill were Whigs; those in the valley were Democrats and Free soilers. In-depth debates in the post-office or store of the town, often led by Bovay, were a common feature of life in Ripon.

As early as 1852, Bovay was calling for a new party to form with a platform to end slavery. At that time, Bovay visited New York and had a conversation with Horace Greeley, the editor of the New York Tribune, on the topic. Bovay told his future friend of his idea of a new party named the Republican Party, and Greeley, who had himself already proposed the name "Republican," was enthusiastic.

In 1854, because of the issue of the Kansas–Nebraska Act being considered by the United States Congress, Bovay, a member of the 36-year-old Whig Party, called a meeting to be held on the evening of February 28, 1854 at the Congregational church. There, a resolution was adopted that if the Nebraska bill passed, the attendees would "throw old party organizations to the winds and organize a new party on the sole issue of slavery."

Another incident in Wisconsin strengthened the momentum of abolitionism in the state. A slave, Joshua Glover, had found his way to the outskirts of Racine, Wisconsin. On March 9, his Missouri master obtained a warrant from the United States district court to apprehend Glover, who was brought to the Milwaukee jail. That night, led by Sherman Booth, citizens stormed the jail and rescued Glover.

After Congress passed the controversial bill, another meeting was held the evening of March 20 in a small frame schoolhouse, where the new party was officially formed. Bovay and 16 others attended the meeting. They came out of the schoolhouse in agreement that one unified front was crucial to the fight against slavery and thus began the Republican Party: "We went into the little meeting held in a school house Whigs, Free Soilers, and Democrats. We came out of it Republicans and we were the first Republicans in the Union," he would say. Although the Oconomowoc newspaper editor Edwin Hurlbut was credited with naming the Republican Party, Bovay later wrote that he had named the party "Republican." He said that he chose the name because it was a simple but significant word synonymous with equality. Moreover, Thomas Jefferson had earlier chosen "Republican" to refer to his party, which gave the name respect borne of historical significance. Greeley boosted the name of the Republicans to national prominence. Bovay later wrote, "The actors in that remote little eddy of politics realized at the time that they were making history by that solitary tallow candle in the little white schoolhouse on the prairie."

Bovay was a Republican member of the Wisconsin State Assembly in 1859 and 1860 and represented the first district of Fond du Lac County. In the American Civil War, he served as major of the 19th Wisconsin Infantry Regiment from 1861 to 1865. After the Civil War, Bovay again took up the practice of law.

Bovay denounced the Republican Party in 1874, just as he had condemned his own Whig Party and started the Republican Party 20 years earlier, and declared, "The mission of the Republican party had ended with the overthrow of slavery and the reconstruction of the old slave states on a free basis... Its place should be taken by a new party with prohibition as its central idea." He became chairman of the first state central committee of the Prohibition Party of Wisconsin.

== Death ==
He died at 84 on January 13, 1903, in Santa Monica, California.

== See also ==
- History of the United States Republican Party

== Sources ==
- Pedrick, Samuel M. The life of Alvan E. Bovay: Founder of the Republican Party in Ripon, Wisconsin, March 20, 1854, booklet published around 1950
