= American Sportsman's Library =

- Trade Edition Volume Cover
- Author: Various
- Publisher: Macmillan Co.
- Publication date: 1902

The American Sportsman's Library is a series of 16 uniformly-bound volumes on sporting subjects, from an American perspective, published by the Macmillan Company (see Macmillan Publishers) in the period 1902-1905. Caspar Whitney, the owner/editor of Outing magazine and a well-known outdoorsman and sporting journalist, edited the series. Authors, including Theodore Roosevelt (writing while President of the United States), were noted experts in their fields.

M.L. Biscotti, in American Sporting Book Series (1994), states that "[t]he authors of these titles were a "Who's Who of American sportsmen of the era....Macmillan designed a premium series....The sixteen titles produced in this series represent that era's best sporting literature."

The trade edition of each volume was 7 7/8 by 5 1/2 inches (200 by 140 mm) with green cloth covers with gilt titles and decorations. The books cost $2 or $3 each, relatively high prices for the time (about $54 and $81 inflation-adjusted to 2016). They included extensive black-and-white illustrations from paintings or photographs. Macmillan also issued a "large paper" edition limited to one hundred numbered copies of each work. These were 9 by 6 1/4 inches (230 by 160 mm) and bound in three-quarter olive green (typically now faded to brown) leather. They cost $7.50 in 1902 (about $202 inflation-adjusted to 2016). A 1924 reprinting of the trade edition introduced dust jackets and a slightly reduced size of 7 1/2 by 5 inches (190 by 130 mm).

Macmillan advertised advance notice of, but ultimately did not publish, four additional volumes. These include Skating, Hockey, and Kite Sailing; Baseball and Football; The Bear Family; and Cougar, Wildcat, Wolf, and Fox.

Two useful series for comparison purposes are the slightly earlier British Badminton Library of Sports and Pastimes and the later British Lonsdale Library of Sports, Games and Pastimes (Seeley, Service & Co.). The Derrydale Press published a series of high-quality American sporting books in the late 1920s and 1930s that, to some extent, supplanted the American Sportsman's Library.

Whitney testified in a lawsuit against him that he earned a salary of $1,500 (about $39,000 inflation-adjusted to 2016) for editing the American Sportsman's Library.

== Volumes of the American Sportsman's Library ==
- Anderson, E.L. and P. Collier, Riding and Driving (1905)
- Brownell, L.W., Photography for the Sportsman Naturalist (1904)
- Busby, Hamilton, The Trotting and Pacing Horse in America (1904)
- Crowther, Samuel and A. Ruhl, Rowing and Track Athletics (1904)
- Graham, Joseph A., The Sporting Dog (1904)
- Henshall, James A., Bass, Pike, Perch and other Game Fishes of America (1903)
- Holder, Charles F., The Big Game Fishes of the United States (1903)
- Money, A.W. et al., Guns, Ammunition and Tackle (1904)
- Paret, J.P. and W. H. Maddren, Lawn Tennis: Its Past, Present and Future, by J. Parmly Paret; to which is Added a Chapter on Lacrosse by William Harvey Maddren (1904)
- Roosevelt, Theodore et al., The Deer Family (1902)
- Sage, Dean et al., Salmon and Trout (1902)
- Sandys, Edwyn and T.S. Van Dyke, Upland Game Birds (1902)
- Sanford, L. C. et al., The Waterfowl Family (1903)
- Stephens, William P., American Yachting (1904)
- Trevathan, Charles E., The American Thoroughbred (1905)
- Whitney, Caspar et al., Musk Ox, Bison, Sheep, and Goat (1904)
