= Knollward =

Lake house in Wisconsin

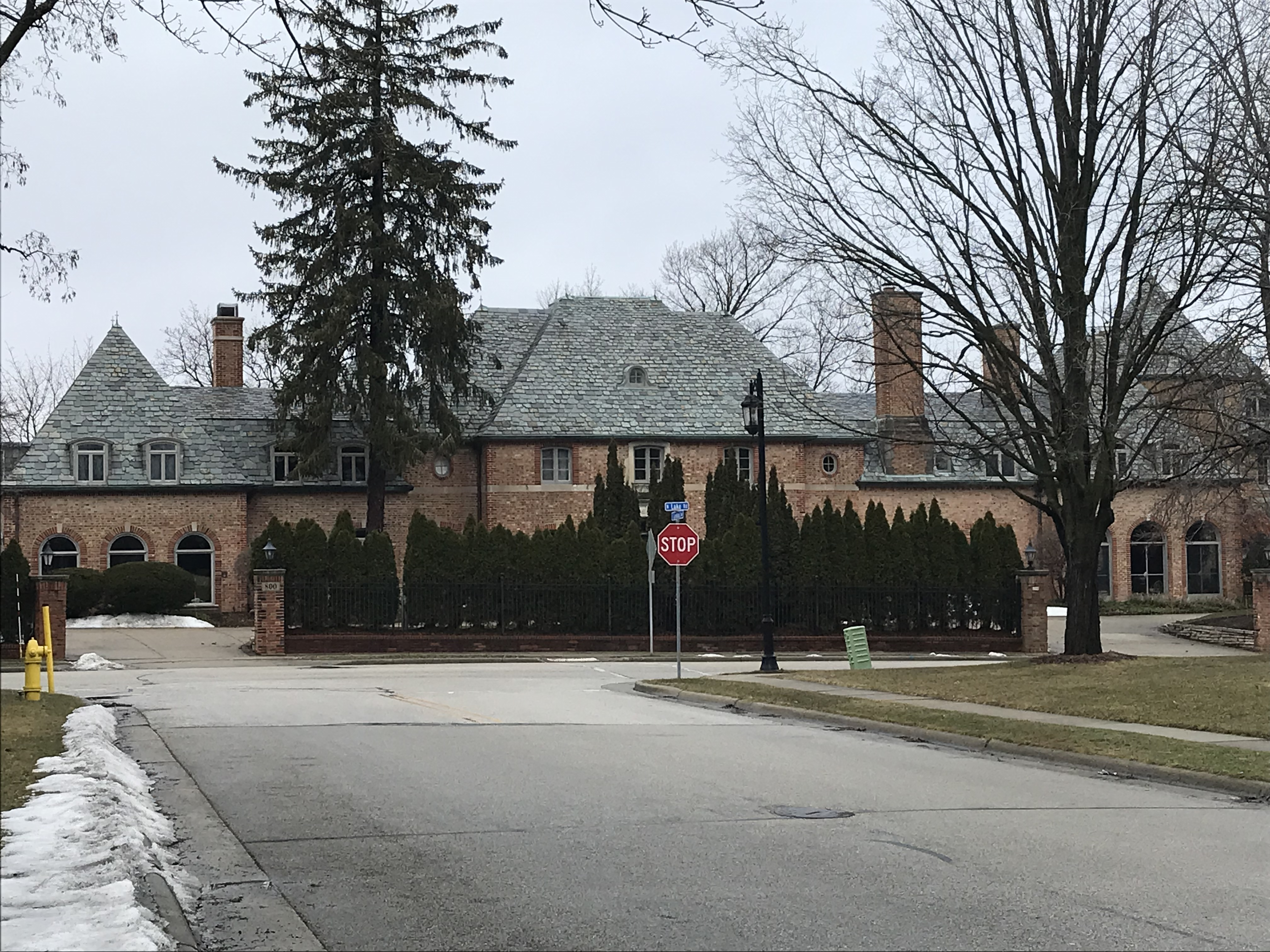
- Interactive map of the Knollward area

General information
- Type: Single-family home
- Architectural style: French Provincial
- Location: 800 N Lake Rd, Oconomowoc, WI 53066, Oconomowoc, United States
- Coordinates: 43.12°N 88.500278°W
- Construction stopped: 1928
- Completed: 1928
- Renovated: 1932
- Client: Marjorie Montgomery Ward

Technical details
- Floor area: 15,222-square-foot (1,414.2 m^{2})

Design and construction
- Architect: Thomas Van Alyea
- Designations: Architecture and History Inventory of the Wisconsin Historical Society

Knollward is a 1928 mansion in the style of a French manor house located in Oconomowoc, Wisconsin. It was designed by Thomas Van Alyea for Marjorie Montgomery Ward. The home was added to the Architecture and History Inventory of the Wisconsin Historical Society in 1995.

== History ==
The home in Oconomowoc, Wisconsin, was designed by Milwaukee-based architect Thomas Van Alyea and Brew City artist George Spinti III, and was owned by Marjorie Montgomery Ward Baker. Construction was completed in 1928. The property features 700 feet (210 m) of lake frontage on Oconomowoc's Lac LaBelle. Known as Knollward, it is an example of French manor house architecture. The estate covers 15,222-square-foot (1,414.2 m^{2}), with 30 rooms. Interior designers and craftsmen spent 10 months completing the interior. An addition was made when Marjorie married Robert Baker. The home includes 15 bathrooms and 8 bedrooms, one of which features a dog bathtub. There is also a garage for four and a half cars. Cyril Colnik was commissioned for the ironwork.

On February 1, 1962, the home was converted into a facility for the aged. It was purchased for $300,000 USD and operated by the Lutheran Homes Society. The mansion was later sold to private owners, who renovated it in the 1990s. In 1995, Knollward was added to the Architecture and History Inventory of the Wisconsin Historical Society (WHS) as "800 Lake Rd" and is classified as French Provincial architecture. In 2017, the Knollward Mansion was sold to new owners.
