= Minnewoc =

Minnewoc mansion
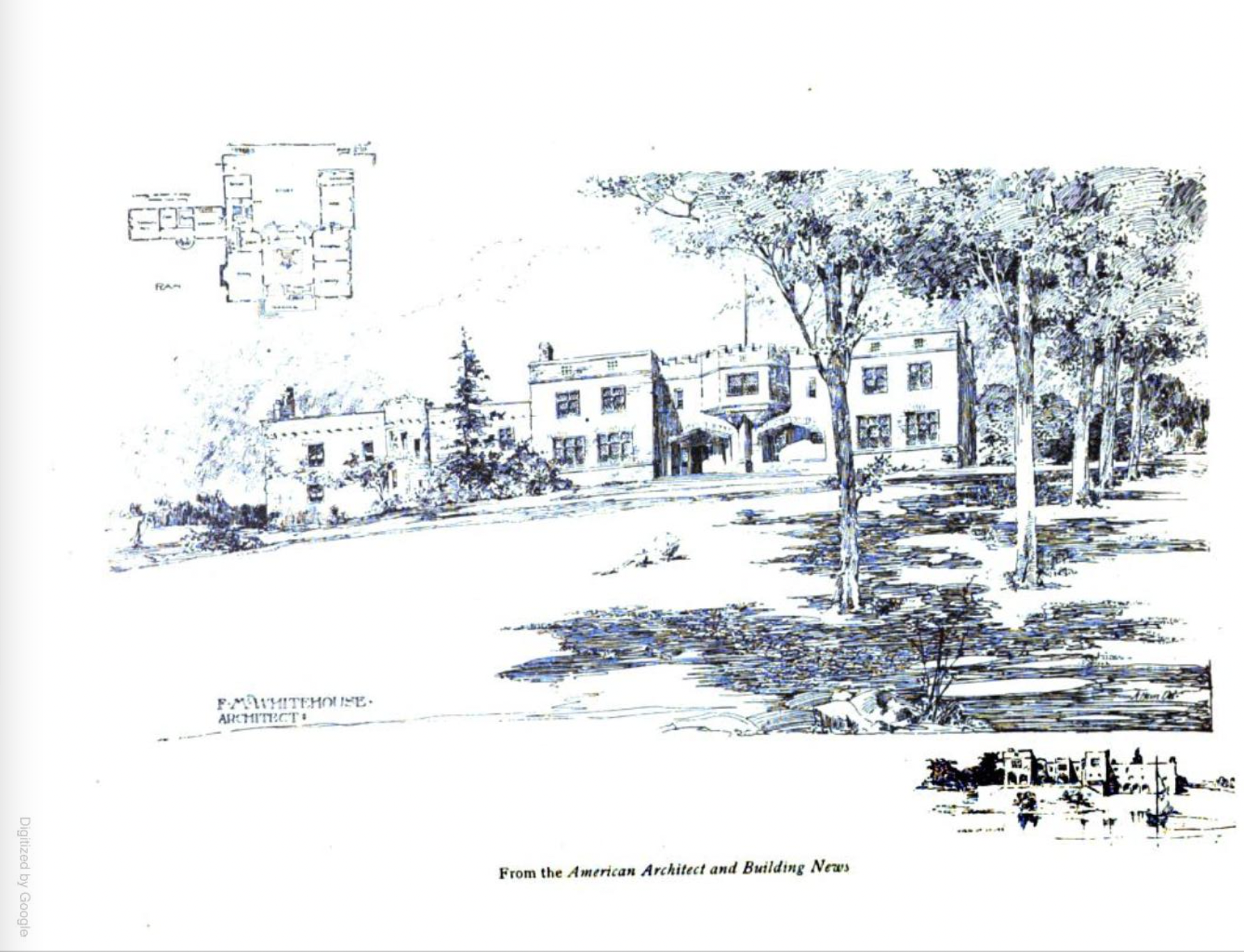
- Minnewoc architectural drawing
- Interactive map of the Minnewoc mansion area

General information
- Type: Single family home
- Architectural style: Castle
- Location: 35308 Pabst Road, Oconomowoc, Wisconsin, United States, 53066
- Coordinates: 43.083611°N 88.447222°W
- Construction stopped: 1892
- Renovated: 2013
- Demolished: 2021
- Owner: George Bullen

Technical details
- Material: Brick
- Floor area: 16,000-square-foot (1,500 m^{2})

Design and construction
- Architect: F.M. Whitehouse

Minnewoc 1892 is also known as Bullen’s Castle because it was built to resemble Anne Boleyn's Hever Castle and it was built in for George Bullen. The home was built on 100 acres of land in Oconomowoc, Wisconsin. It was built in the style of an English Manor house, but it was razed in 2021.

== Background ==
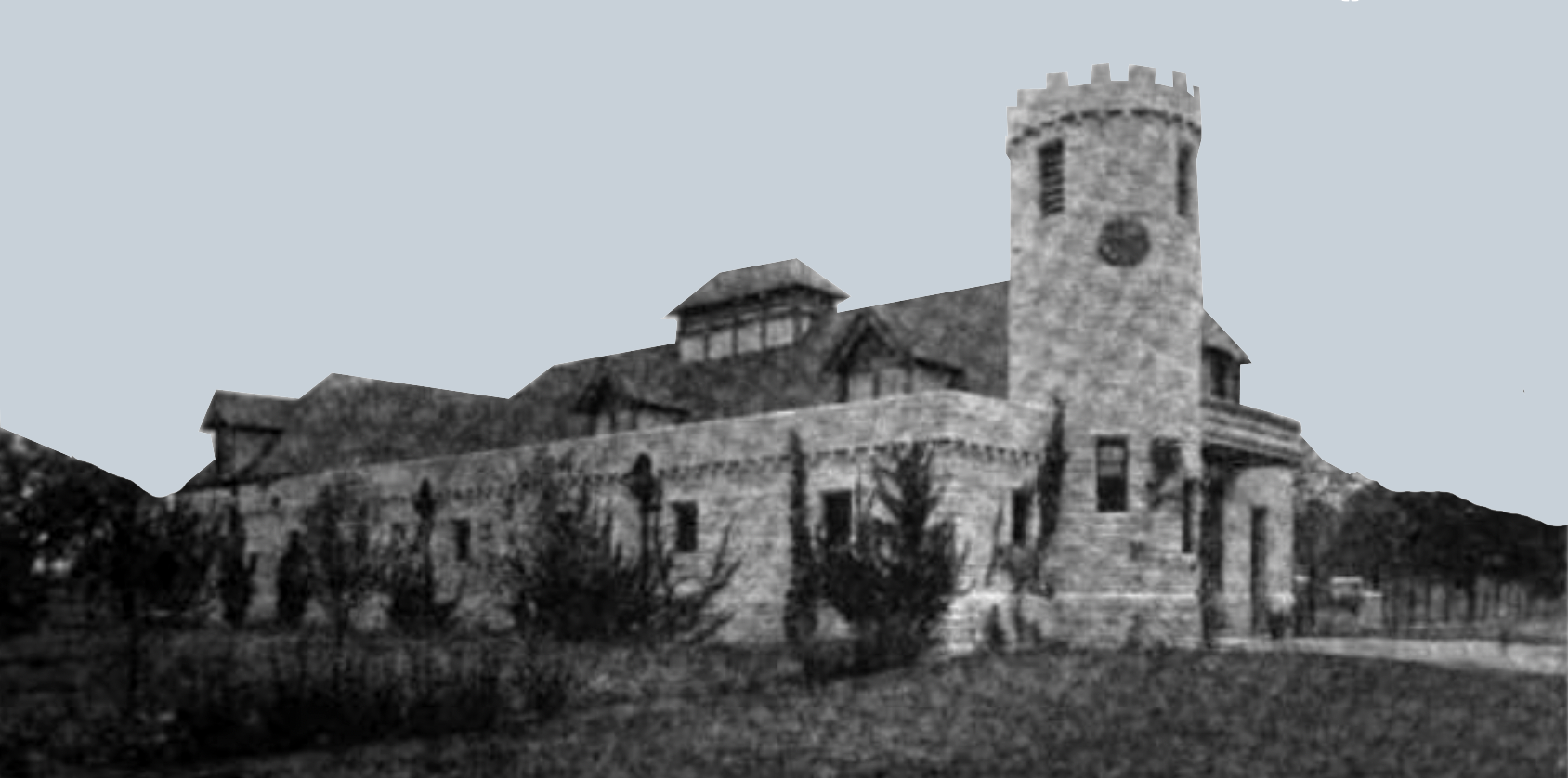
1902 image of the stable at Minnewoc

The land was owned by Julie Lapham who was from the family that founded Carroll College. The home was built for George Bullen, who was a wealthy malt tycoon from Chicago. 1n 1868, Bullen established a malting house in Kenosha, Wisconsin. Bullen's mother-in-law, the educator, Jennie Coldwell Nixon, died at Minnewoc in 1917.

The home was named "Minnewoc" which is a native American word meaning "place of waters. There is a natural spring found on the property.

== History ==
The home was designed by architect F.M. Whitehouse, and it is 16,000-square-foot (1,500 m^{2}) with 21 rooms and 6 bedroom suites. The original property stretched for 100 acres. It now sits on 7.2 acres, with 800 feet (240 m) feet of lake frontage and features a private island. The home was designed in the style of Anne Boleyn's Hever Castle in England. It was architectural style is referred to as English Manor House. The home was originally 10,000-square-foot (930 m^{2}) but in 2013 6,000-square-foot (560 m^{2}) was added in an addition. The new owners also added solar panels and they put it up for sale in 2017 for 10.5 million USD. It was sold in 2021 for 7.799 million USD in 2021 and the new owners had it torn down the same year.
