= James Alexander Henshall =

Physician, naturalist and writer (1836-1925)

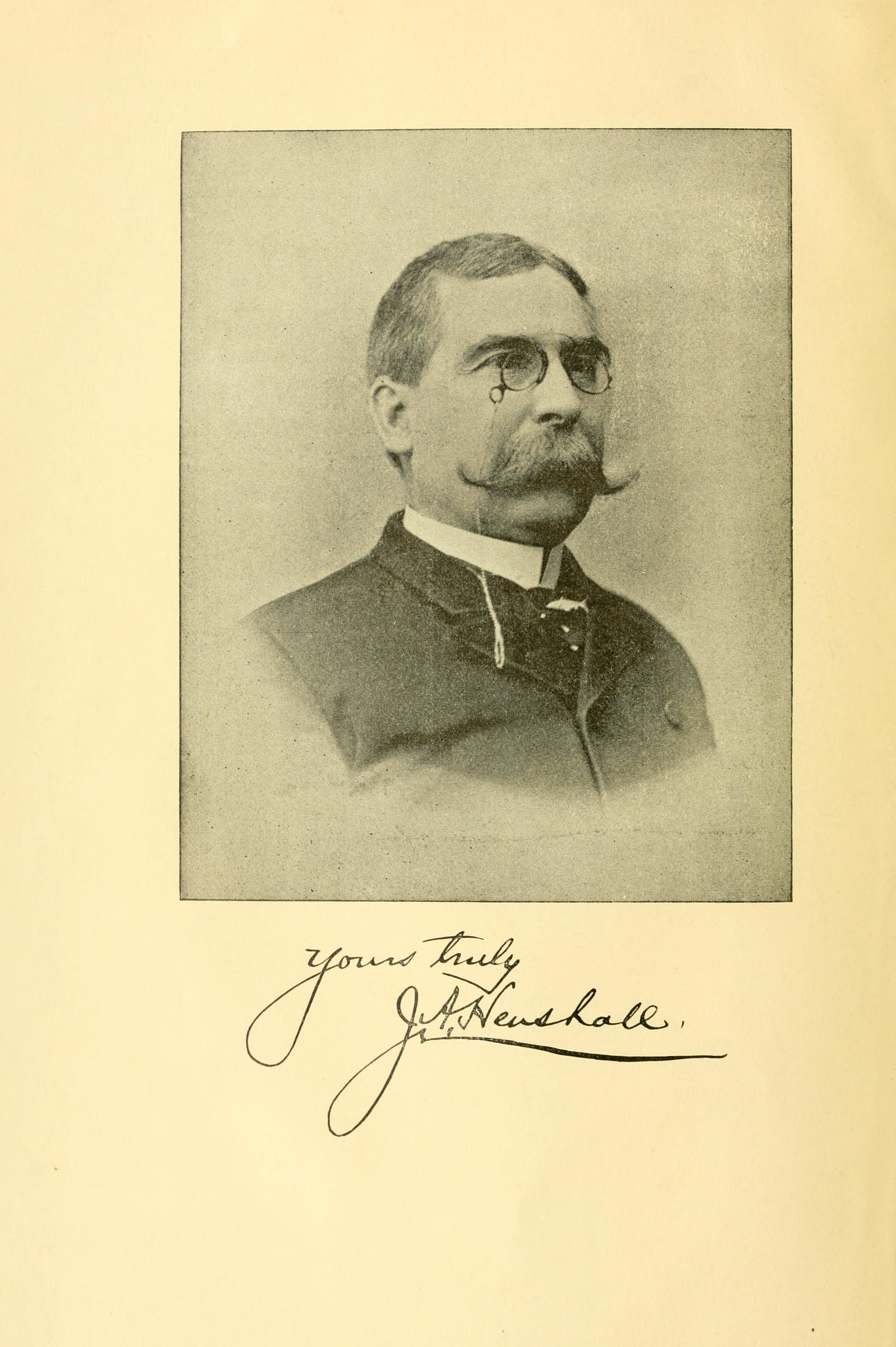
- Portrait of James alexander Henhall: Book of the black bass (frontispiece)
- Born: February 29, 1836; Baltimore, Maryland
- Died: April 4, 1925 (aged 89); Cincinnati, Ohio
- Occupations: Writer, Politician
- Spouse: Hester Stansbury Ferguson (m. 1854)
- Writing career
- Genre: Non-fiction
- Subject: Fishing

Mayor of Oconomowoc
- In office April 21, 1868 - April 5, 1870
- Preceded by: David Henry Rockwell
- Succeeded by: William Thompson

James Alexander Henshall (February 29, 1836 – April 4, 1925) was an author on fishing. He was known as the "apostle of the black bass". His book Bass, Pike, Perch and other Game Fishes of America (1903) is part of the American Sportsman's Library. And was Mayor of Oconomowoc 1868–1870.

== Biography ==
He was born on February 29, 1836, in Baltimore, Maryland, to James Gershom Henshall and Clarissa Holt. He married Hester Stansbury Ferguson, a botanical collector and notable artist of plants, on June 9, 1854. He died on April 4, 1925, in Cincinnati, Ohio. Henshall was claimed to never having children during his lifetime.

== Mayor of Oconomowoc ==
Henshall moved to Oconomowoc Wisconsin, in the 1860’s and was elected to become the first mayor in 1868 and served in the Town Council for two years. Henshall retired as mayor in 1870 and moved out of Oconomowoc soon after. Many people argue that Henshall was not the first mayor and that Washington W. Collins was. But history books in Wisconsin show that Henshall was the city's first mayor.
