= J. Leslie Sensenbrenner House =

House in Wisconsin designed by Thomas Van Alyea

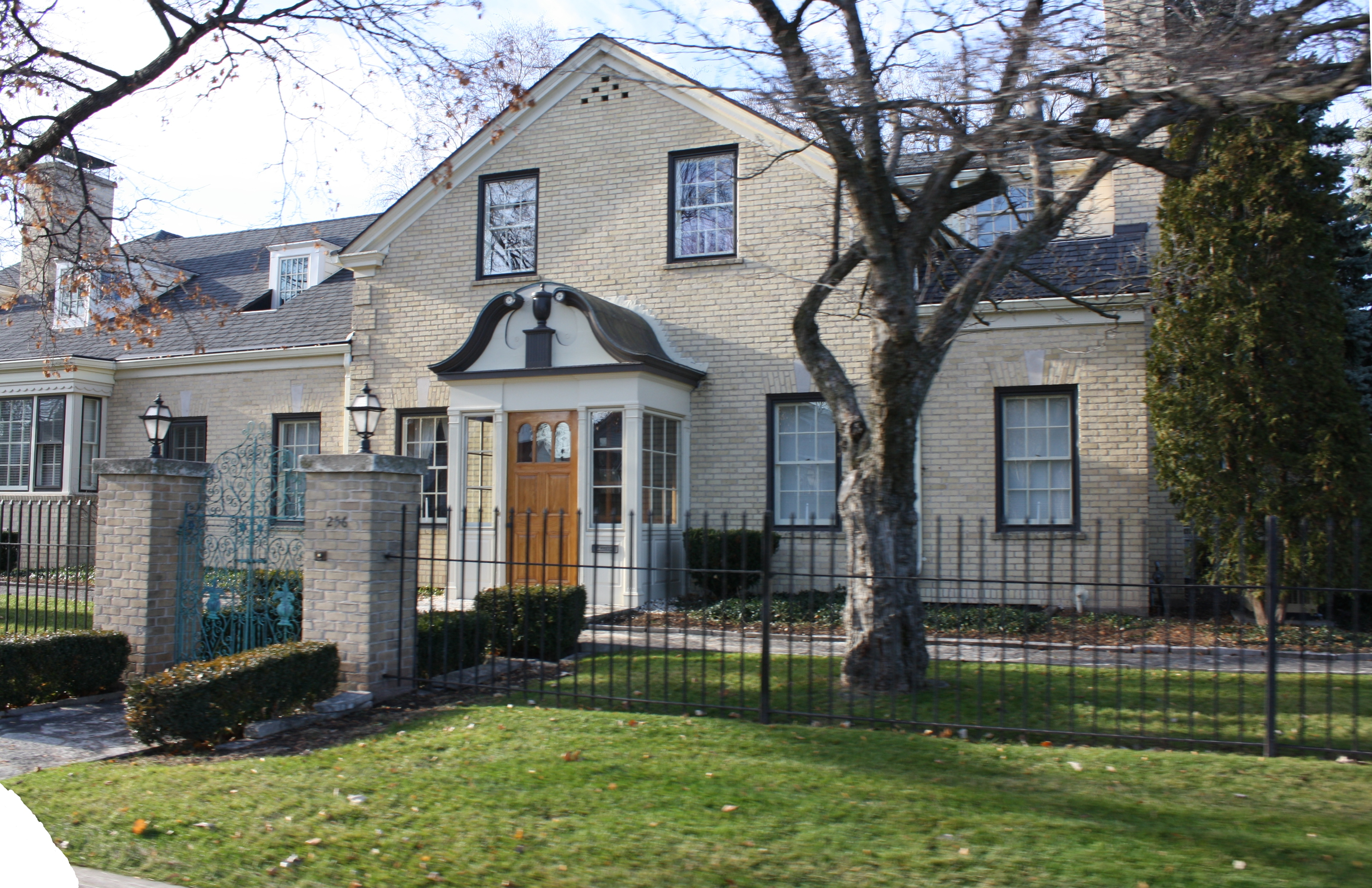
- J. Leslie Sensenbrenner House
- Interactive map of the J. Leslie Sensenbrenner House area

General information
- Location: Neenah, Wisconsin, 256 N Park Ave, Neenah, WI 54956, US
- Completed: 1935

Technical details
- Floor count: 2
- Floor area: 7,625-square-foot (708.4 m^{2})

Design and construction
- Designations
- J. Leslie Sensenbrenner House
- U.S. National Register of Historic Places
- Location within Wisconsin
- Coordinates: 44.185278°N 88.443889°W
- NRHP reference No.: 03000897
- Added to NRHP: September 2, 2003

J. Leslie Sensenbrenner House is a 19th and 20th Century Revival home in Neenah, Wisconsin. It was designed by Thomas Van Alyea and it was added to the National Register of Historic Places listings in Wisconsin on September 2, 2003.

== History ==
The home was completed in 1935 and is located in Neenah, Wisconsin. It was built by the son of Kimberly-Clark president, J. Leslie Sensenbrenner. It is a waterfront property with the Fox River to the west and Lake Winnebago to the East.

The home was added to the National Register of Historic Places listings in Wisconsin (03000897) on September 2, 2003.

== Design ==
The home is 7,625-square-foot (708.4 m^{2}), with eight bedrooms, a powder room, 10 bathrooms, a library, and hidden rooms.
