= La Belle Cemetery =

Cemetery in Oconomowoc, Wisconsin

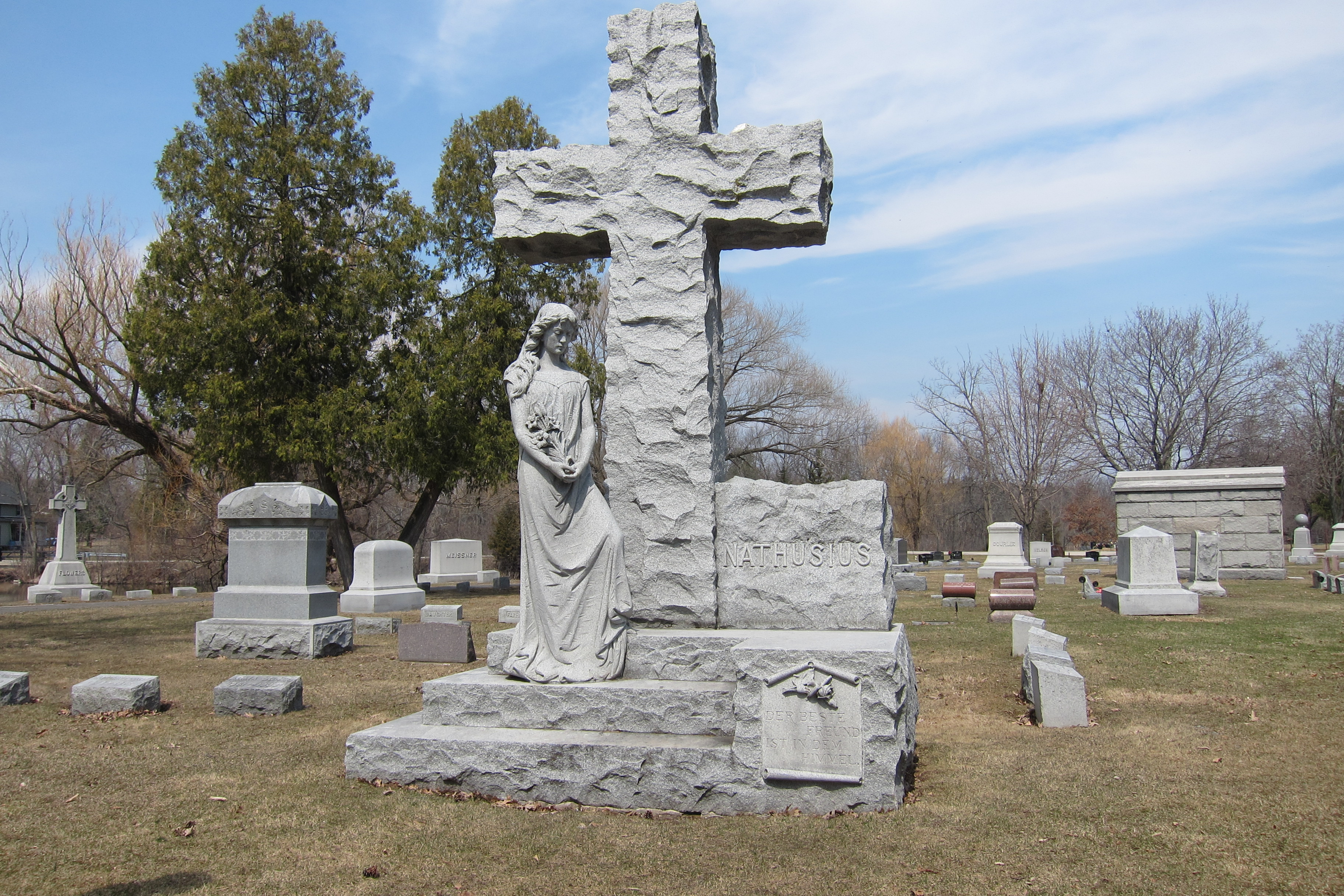
- One of the famous La Belle Cemetery gravesites

Details
- Established: 1851
- Location: Oconomowoc, Wisconsin
- Country: United States
- Coordinates: 43.111636°N 88.487477°W
- No. of interments: >8,000
- Find a Grave

La Belle Cemetery is in Oconomowoc, Wisconsin. Built in 1851, and originally called Henshall Place, it was the first cemetery recorded in Oconomowoc. The cemetery then moved to Walnut Street. In 1864, the Wisconsin Legislature approved the removal of all the bodies from Oconomowoc Cemetery on Walnut Street to the current La Belle Cemetery grounds. The land that is now the grounds for the La Belle Cemetery was first owned by Charles B. Sheldon, which he donated when the Oconomowoc Cemetery became too crowded.

The oldest recorded stones in the cemetery have been there since the early 1800s. Some graves have no headstone and there are no records of who is buried there, just a little X marking a burial spot. The most common symbols found on the headstones are religious crosses. The two mausoleums people visit are the ones for the Kohl family and the Sheldon family. In the cemetery, there is a section for infants and children younger than six years old. Another section was specified for the newest style headstones, which are black marble with pictures and drawings.

== History ==
In 2005 three corporations were found guilty of allowing sediment from nearby construction sites to wash into the cemetery in 2004, and ordered by the court to undertake a $400,000 cleanup of the cemetery.

Over 90 men who fought in the American Civil War are thought to have been buried in La Belle, including the last surviving Civil War veteran in Waukesha County, who died and was buried here in 1942.

== Notable interments ==
- Henry Jordan – NFL football player
- Jennie Coldwell Nixon, educator

== Ghost stories ==
A memorial statue of a woman named Mary Nathsius in La Belle Cemetery is said to come to life. Some tales report that the statue's hands turn black, others, that blood oozes from her eyes, and many of the stories describe the statue as walking to the lake where she drowns herself, as the woman memorialized by the statue is said to have done.
