= Oconomowoc Lake Club =

Lakeside country club In Wisconsin

Coordinates: 43°06′10.9″N 88°27′32.2″W

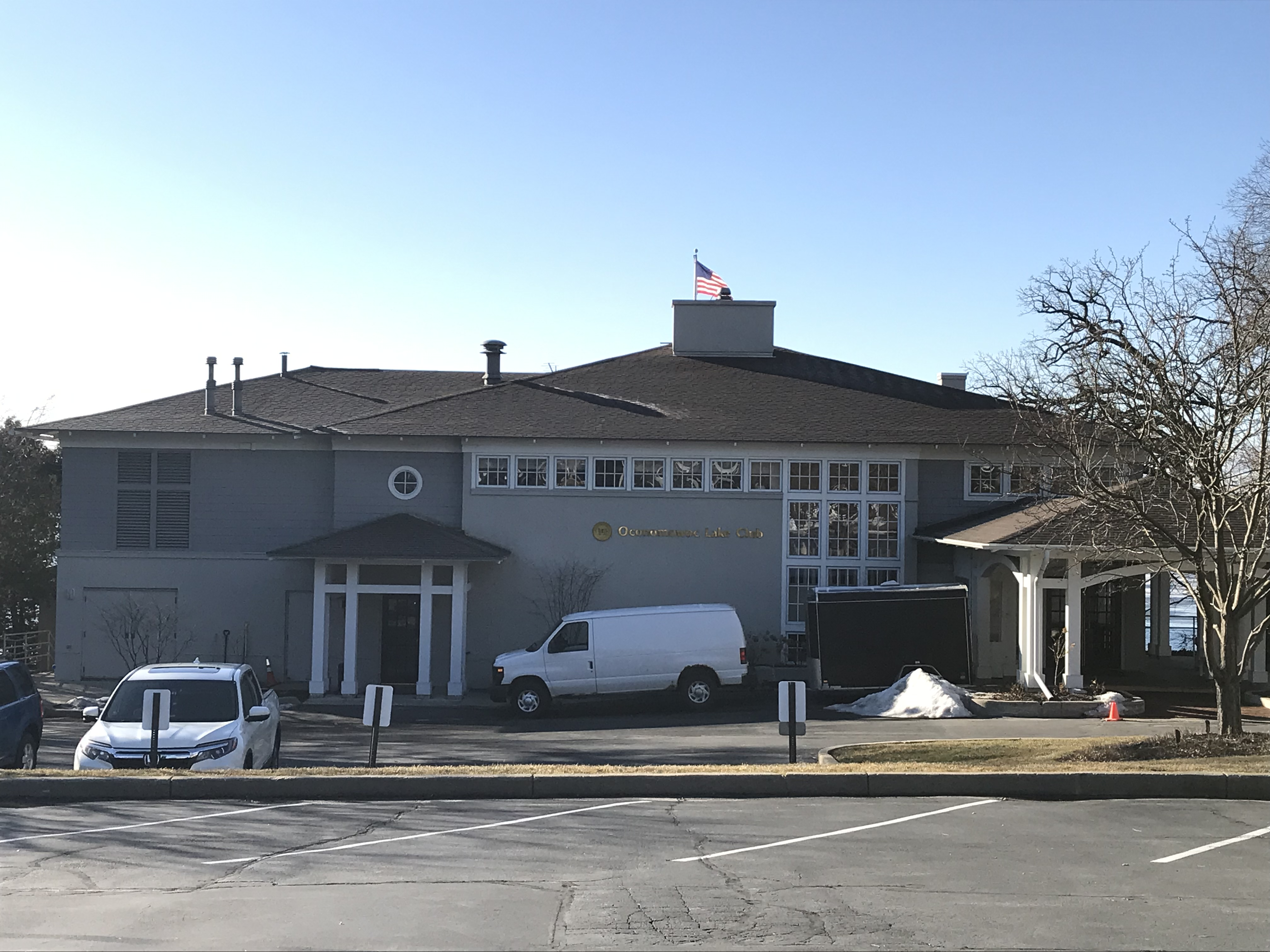
- Industry: Recreation
- Founded: 1890; 136 years ago in Oconomowoc, Wisconsin
- Founder: George P. Gifford
- Headquarters: Oconomowoc, Wisconsin, United States

The Oconomowoc Lake Club is a lakeside country club founded in 1890 by George P. Gifford in on Oconomowoc Lake in Oconomowoc, Wisconsin, United States. It is one of the country's oldest yacht clubs. It was built and designed by Architects Ferry and Clas from Milwaukee, Wisconsin.

== History ==
The Oconomowoc Lake Club was founded in 1890. It was originally involved with an improvement association that had a goal to maintain the lake levels and water traffic coming through the river connected to the lake. The Oconomowoc Lake Club were the ones who ended up installing the Danforth Lock. A local Oconomowoc mail boat was able to travel through this lock and twice a week they would deliver peoples mail to their piers. But that lock was eventually cemented shut and now a dam is used to control the water levels.

The history of the Lake Club is directly connected the Villa Gifford, also known as the Gifford Hotel. This hotel was originally a home located just west of the current Lake Club. George P. Gifford was the center of attention in the late 1800s in the Oconomowoc area; he had guests over often and they loved his food and all the recreational activities they did on Oconomowoc Lake. Eventually in the late 1860s Gifford opened his home to selected guests or members. After some construction to his home he had created a simple lakeside hotel, which predated the founding of the OLC. All the meetings for the next 19 years were held at the Gifford Hotel. The current OLC building was built in 1909. The OLC was noted in Life Magazine when metalworking magnate Ralph Robinson was elected as Commodore of the OLC.

The OLC served members until 1994 when a fire broke out and its 1908-built building was burnt to the ground. After two years of negotiating the OLC was rebuilt in 1996, and as of 2016 it is still in business.
