= Oconomowoc, Wisconsin =

- City
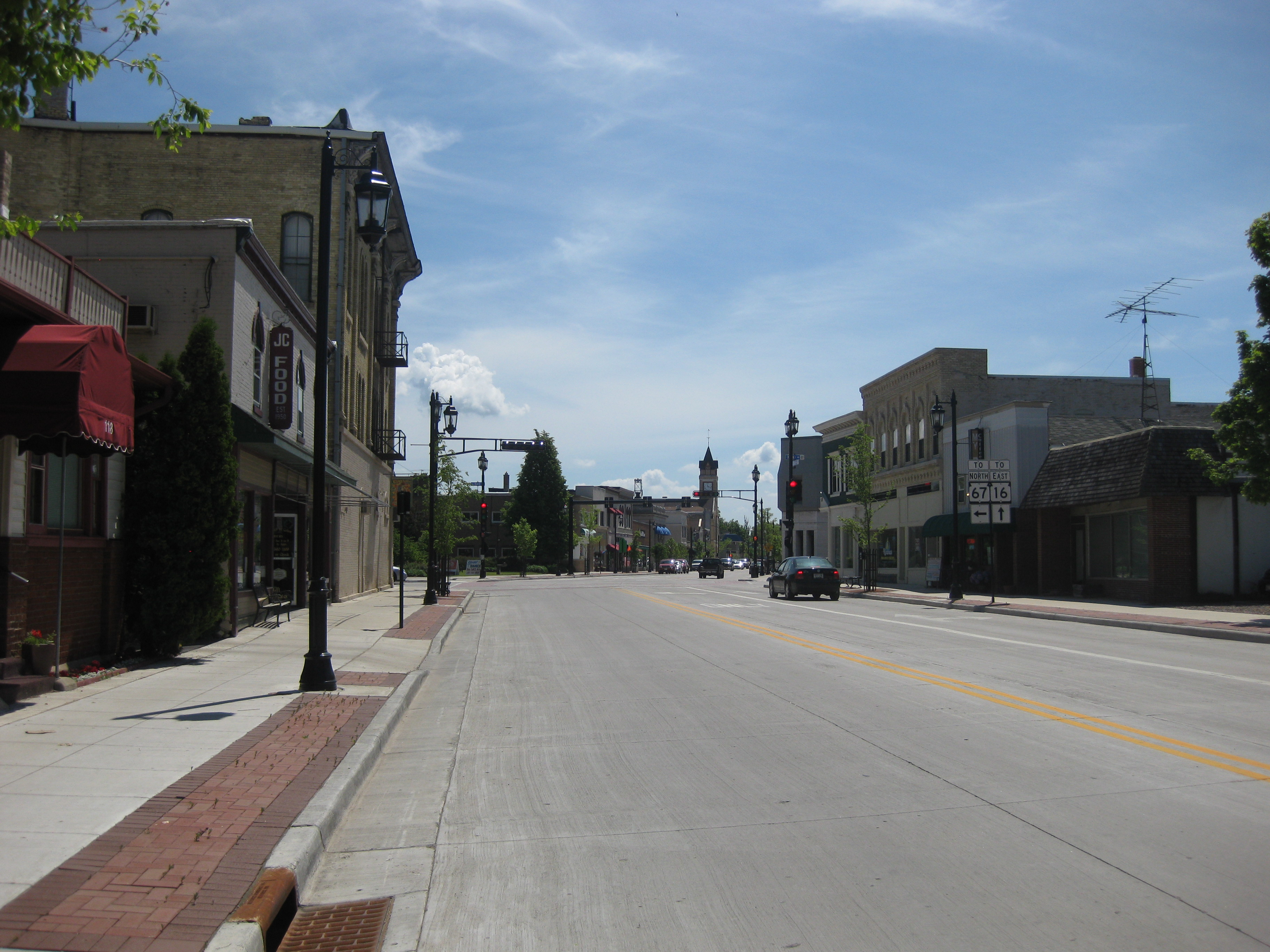
- Downtown Oconomowoc

- Interactive map of Oconomowoc, Wisconsin
- Location within Wisconsin Location within the United States
- Coordinates: 43.1117°N 88.4993°W
- Country: United States
- State: Wisconsin
- County: Waukesha
- Settled: 1837
- Founder: John S. Rockwell

Government
  - Type: Mayor–council
  - Mayor: Matt Rosek

Area
  - Total: 12.43 sq mi (32.19 km^{2})
  - Land: 11.75 sq mi (30.44 km^{2})
  - Water: 0.68 sq mi (1.76 km^{2})
- Elevation: 823 ft (251 m)

Population (2020)
  - Total: 18,203
  - Density: 1,445.0/sq mi (557.93/km^{2})
- Time zone: UTC−6 (Central (CST))
  - Summer (DST): UTC−5 (CDT)
- ZIP Code: 53066, 53067
- Area code: 262
- FIPS code: 55-59250
- Website: oconomowoc-wi.gov

Oconomowoc (/əˈkɒnəməˌwɒk/ ə-KON-ə-mə-wok) is a city in Waukesha County, Wisconsin, United States. The population was 18,203 at the 2020 census. The city is next to the Village of Lac La Belle and near the village of Oconomowoc Lake.

== History ==
Before 1700, this region was inhabited by Potawatomi peoples descended from Woodland Indians known as "mound builders". There are reports that the Sauk Indian chief Black Hawk had a campsite on Oconomowoc Lake.

The first white person recorded in the area was Amable (sometimes spelled "Aumable") Vieau, brother-in-law of Solomon Juneau, one of the founders of Milwaukee. Vieau established a trading post in 1827. White settlers began to follow in 1830.

In April 1837, New York native Charles Sheldon staked a 160-acre claim on the eastern shore of what is now Fowler Lake, registering it with the Land Bank of Milwaukee on April 21, 1837. A few days later, H.W. Blanchard acquired a claim next to Sheldon's on the other side of the lake. Blanchard later sold the claim to Philo Brewer, who built what some consider to be the first residence within Oconomowoc's current legal limits, at what is now 517 N. Lake Road, between La Belle and Fowler lakes. The first recorded birth was that of Eliza Jane Dewey on January 19, 1840, in the lodgings above a chair factory at 116 N. Walnut. The first recorded death was that of Jerusha Foster, who died aged 30 to 36 on March 19, 1841. Initially buried at Zion Church point, she was eventually re-interred at Nashotah Mission.

Oconomowoc was incorporated as a town in 1844, although residents had to go to Summit to get their mail until 1845. Travel and communication links between the new town and nearby cities were quickly established. The Watertown Plank Road was extended to connect Oconomowoc to the nearby towns of Milwaukee, Waukesha, Pewaukee, and Watertown in 1850. Such infrastructure encouraged further settlement, and by 1853 the town grew to a population of 250, with ten stores, three hotels, one gristmill, and one sawmill (both located near the present Lake Road bridge), and a schoolhouse. The first passenger train from Milwaukee arrived in Oconomowoc on December 14, 1854, as part of the Milwaukee and Watertown Railroad Company's rapidly expanding Milwaukee & Mississippi line.

Large houses were established around the Oconomowoc lakes, particularly Oconomowoc Lake and Lac La Belle. The population grew so much that Oconomowoc incorporated as a city in 1865, and by 1880 it had a population of 3,000. In August 1899 a professional golf tournament hosted by the Oconomowoc Country Club was won by Harry Turpie.

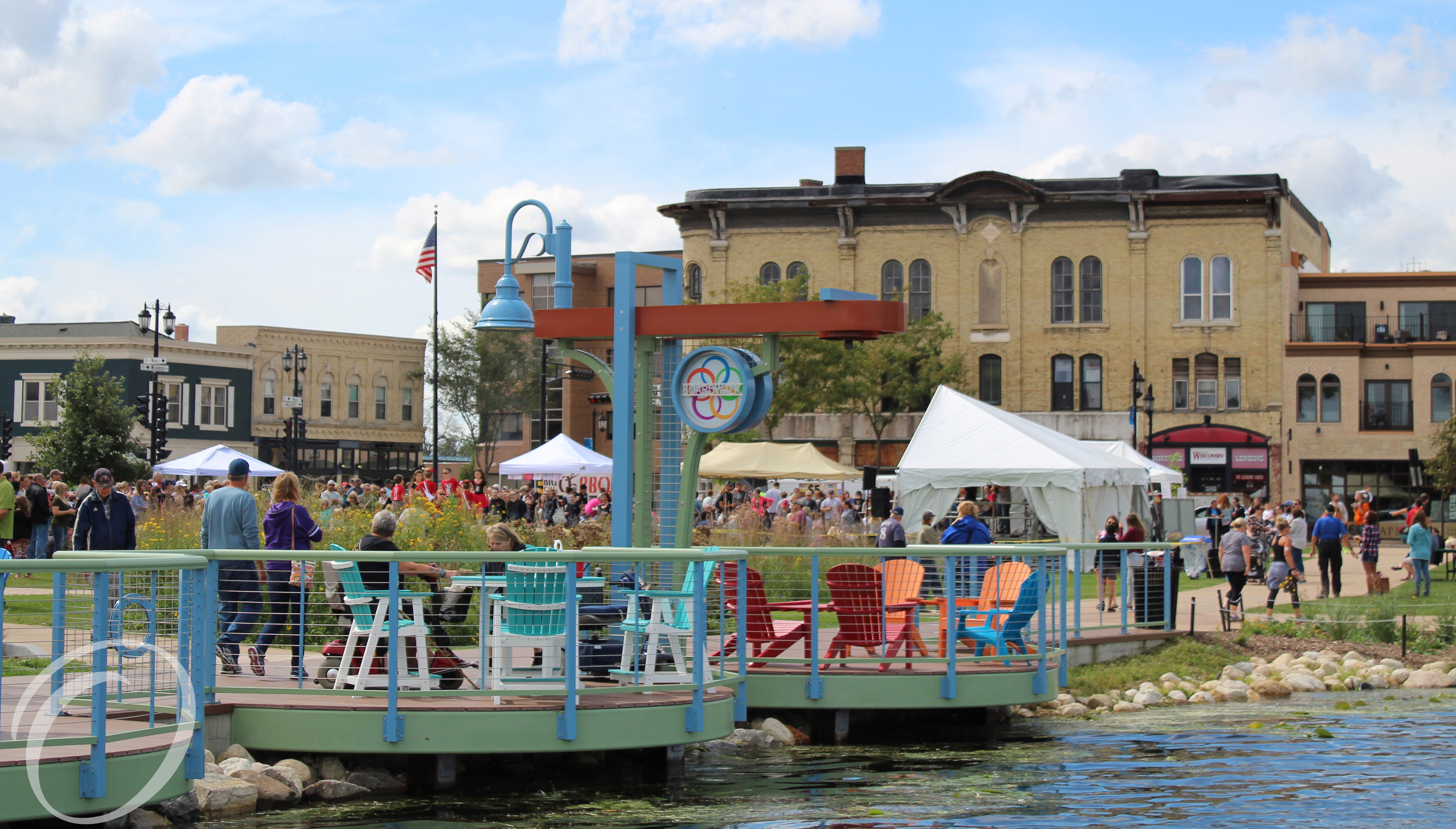
Oconomowoc Fowler Lake Boardwalk

In 2003, Oconomowoc acquired Pabst Farms from the Town of Summit. Pabst Farms, which had previously been owned by the Pabst family, is being developed as a mixture of commercial and residential property. On April 2, 2008, a gas line exploded just west of downtown, destroying the First Baptist Church on West Wisconsin Avenue. The church, which was built in 1913, was completely destroyed, except for the frame of its bell tower, which later had to be torn down as it was at risk of collapse. The source of the explosion was an old gas line that had been capped off sometime in 1972–1973; it ruptured after having been struck by a backhoe as utility work was being done on Wisconsin Avenue in preparation for reconstruction of the street.

In 2025, the City of Oconomowoc attempted to stop the Village of Lac La Belle from merging with the Town of Oconomowoc. The city's attempts to stop the merger were unsuccessful. This merger landlocks the city into its current borders.

== Geography ==
Oconomowoc is located at 43°6′31″N 88°29′49″W (43.108814, −88.497019). It is located in the Lake Country area of Waukesha County. According to the United States Census Bureau, the city has a total area of 12.18 square miles (31.55 km^{2}), of which 11.54 square miles (29.89 km^{2}) is land and 0.64 square miles (1.66 km^{2}) is water.

Climate data for Oconomowoc, Wisconsin, 1991–2020 normals, extremes 1893–present
Month	Jan	Feb	Mar	Apr	May	Jun	Jul	Aug	Sep	Oct	Nov	Dec	Year
Record high °F (°C)	59 (15)	69 (21)	83 (28)	88 (31)	94 (34)	100 (38)	103 (39)	101 (38)	98 (37)	87 (31)	76 (24)	67 (19)	103 (39)
Mean maximum °F (°C)	48.2 (9.0)	52.0 (11.1)	66.6 (19.2)	78.2 (25.7)	85.4 (29.7)	90.4 (32.4)	91.2 (32.9)	89.9 (32.2)	87.7 (30.9)	80.5 (26.9)	65.6 (18.7)	52.0 (11.1)	93.4 (34.1)
Mean daily maximum °F (°C)	28.1 (−2.2)	32.0 (0.0)	43.7 (6.5)	56.4 (13.6)	68.6 (20.3)	78.4 (25.8)	82.3 (27.9)	80.6 (27.0)	73.8 (23.2)	60.8 (16.0)	46.0 (7.8)	33.7 (0.9)	57.0 (13.9)
Daily mean °F (°C)	19.6 (−6.9)	23.0 (−5.0)	34.2 (1.2)	46.1 (7.8)	57.9 (14.4)	67.7 (19.8)	71.8 (22.1)	70.2 (21.2)	62.7 (17.1)	50.3 (10.2)	37.3 (2.9)	25.9 (−3.4)	47.2 (8.5)
Mean daily minimum °F (°C)	11.1 (−11.6)	14.0 (−10.0)	24.6 (−4.1)	35.8 (2.1)	47.2 (8.4)	57.0 (13.9)	61.2 (16.2)	59.7 (15.4)	51.6 (10.9)	39.8 (4.3)	28.6 (−1.9)	18.0 (−7.8)	37.4 (3.0)
Mean minimum °F (°C)	−10.9 (−23.8)	−6.6 (−21.4)	4.9 (−15.1)	21.8 (−5.7)	32.8 (0.4)	42.7 (5.9)	49.9 (9.9)	48.7 (9.3)	36.6 (2.6)	25.6 (−3.6)	12.5 (−10.8)	−2.2 (−19.0)	−14.7 (−25.9)
Record low °F (°C)	−33 (−36)	−29 (−34)	−19 (−28)	4 (−16)	23 (−5)	26 (−3)	41 (5)	39 (4)	26 (−3)	10 (−12)	−14 (−26)	−25 (−32)	−33 (−36)
Average precipitation inches (mm)	1.65 (42)	1.61 (41)	2.10 (53)	3.86 (98)	4.14 (105)	4.86 (123)	4.12 (105)	4.17 (106)	3.39 (86)	2.83 (72)	2.21 (56)	1.87 (47)	36.81 (934)
Average snowfall inches (cm)	11.1 (28)	9.8 (25)	4.8 (12)	2.0 (5.1)	0.2 (0.51)	0.0 (0.0)	0.0 (0.0)	0.0 (0.0)	0.0 (0.0)	0.1 (0.25)	1.4 (3.6)	10.2 (26)	39.6 (100.46)
Average extreme snow depth inches (cm)	7.1 (18)	7.1 (18)	4.6 (12)	1.2 (3.0)	0.1 (0.25)	0.0 (0.0)	0.0 (0.0)	0.0 (0.0)	0.0 (0.0)	0.1 (0.25)	1.2 (3.0)	5.1 (13)	9.9 (25)
Average precipitation days (≥ 0.01 in)	11.0	9.8	9.9	12.3	13.2	11.7	10.4	9.9	9.5	10.8	9.7	11.0	129.2
Average snowy days (≥ 0.1 in)	8.9	7.2	4.2	1.5	0.0	0.0	0.0	0.0	0.0	0.1	1.8	7.5	31.2
Source 1: NOAA
Source 2: National Weather Service

== Demographics ==
Historical population
Census	Pop.	Note	%±
1860	699		—
1870	1,408		101.4%
1880	2,174		54.4%
1890	2,729		25.5%
1900	2,880		5.5%
1910	3,054		6.0%
1920	3,301		8.1%
1930	4,190		26.9%
1940	4,562		8.9%
1950	5,345		17.2%
1960	6,682		25.0%
1970	8,742		30.8%
1980	9,909		13.3%
1990	10,993		10.9%
2000	12,383		12.6%
2010	15,759		27.3%
2020	18,203		15.5%
U.S. Decennial Census

=== 2020 census ===
As of the 2020 census, Oconomowoc had a population of 18,203. The median age was 41.9 years. 23.3% of residents were under the age of 18 and 19.4% of residents were 65 years of age or older. For every 100 females there were 93.5 males, and for every 100 females age 18 and over there were 90.2 males age 18 and over.

95.7% of residents lived in urban areas, while 4.3% lived in rural areas.

There were 7,584 households in Oconomowoc, of which 29.5% had children under the age of 18 living in them. Of all households, 52.1% were married-couple households, 15.8% were households with a male householder and no spouse or partner present, and 26.5% were households with a female householder and no spouse or partner present. About 29.8% of all households were made up of individuals and 14.0% had someone living alone who was 65 years of age or older.

There were 8,043 housing units, of which 5.7% were vacant. The homeowner vacancy rate was 1.6% and the rental vacancy rate was 4.4%.

Racial composition as of the 2020 census
Race	Number	Percent
White	16,674	91.6%
Black or African American	130	0.7%
American Indian and Alaska Native	34	0.2%
Asian	213	1.2%
Native Hawaiian and Other Pacific Islander	0	0.0%
Some other race	231	1.3%
Two or more races	921	5.1%
Hispanic or Latino (of any race)	772	4.2%

=== 2010 census ===
As of the 2010 census, there were 15,759 people, 6,256 households, and 4,270 families living in the city. The population density was 1,365.6 inhabitants per square mile (527.3/km^{2}). There were 6,662 housing units at an average density of 577.3 per square mile (222.9/km^{2}). The racial makeup of the city was 96.0% White, 0.5% African American, 0.2% Native American, 1.0% Asian, 1.1% from other races, and 1.2% from two or more races. Hispanic or Latino of any race were 3.5% of the population.

There were 6,256 households, of which 34.8% had children under the age of 18 living with them, 56.7% were married couples living together, 8.1% had a female householder with no husband present, 3.5% had a male householder with no wife present, and 31.7% were non-families. Of all households, 27.0% were made up of individuals, and 11.4% had someone living alone who was 65 years of age or older. The average household size was 2.48 and the average family size was 3.04.

The median age in the city was 38.6 years. 26.3% of residents were under the age of 18; 5.4% were between the ages of 18 and 24; 28% were from 25 to 44; 25.5% were from 45 to 64; and 14.7% were 65 years of age or older. The gender makeup of the city was 47.7% male and 52.3% female.

=== 2000 census ===
As of the 2000 census, there were 12,382 people, 4,968 households, and 3,293 families living in the city. The population density was 1,845.5 people per square mile (712.5/km^{2}). There were 5,239 housing units at an average density of 780.9 per square mile (301.5/km^{2}). The racial makeup of the city was 97.71% White, 0.31% Black or African American, 0.28% Native American, 0.53% Asian, 0.01% Pacific Islander, 0.47% from other races, and 0.69% from two or more races. About 1.65% of the population were Hispanic or Latino of any race.

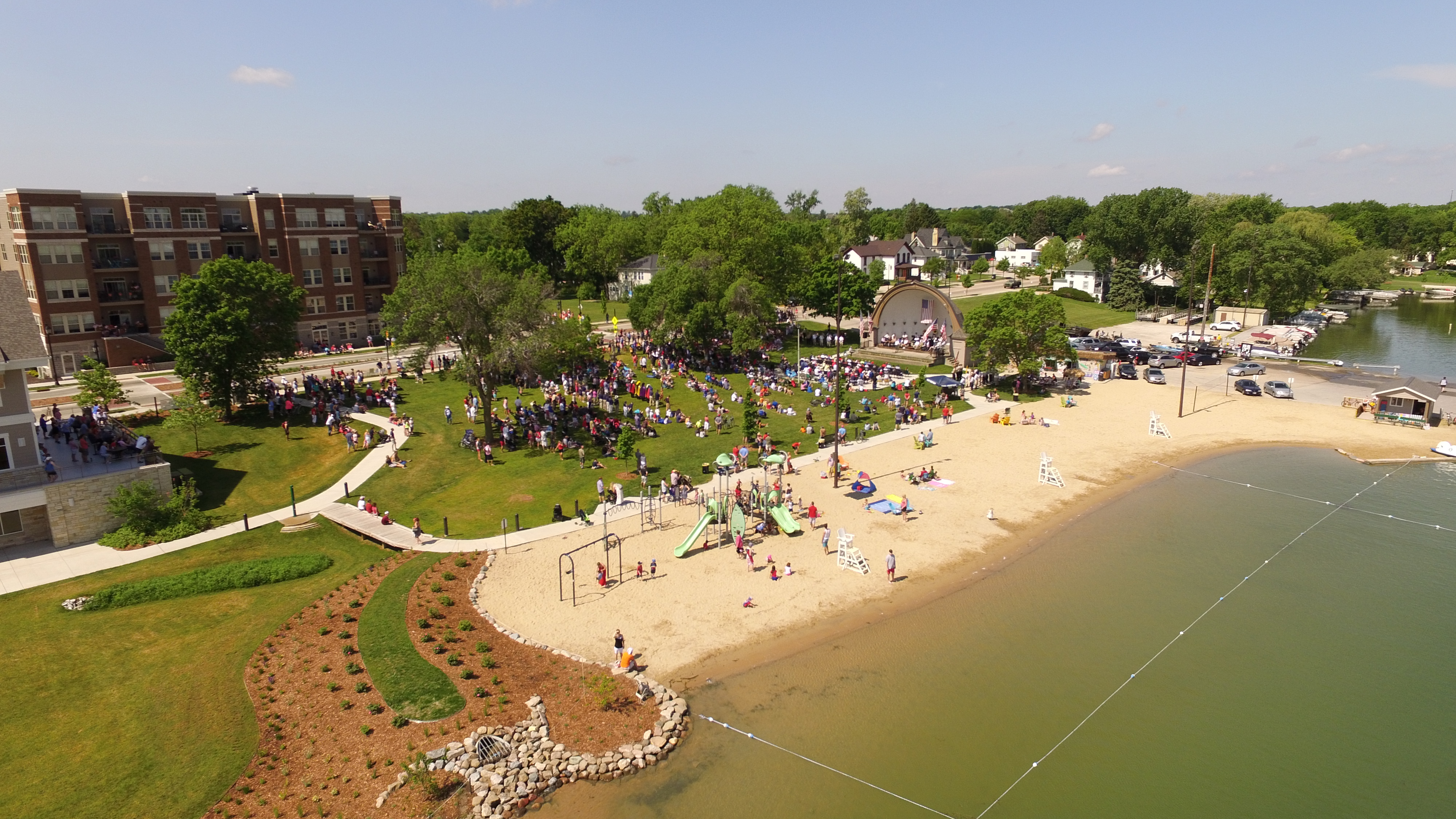
Oconomowoc City Beach

Approximately 30.7% of households had children under the age of 18 living with them, 54.7% were married couples living together, 8.3% had a female householder with no husband present, and 33.7% were non-families. Some 28.6% of all households were made up of individuals, and 13.5% had someone living alone who was 65 years of age or older. The average household size was 2.40 and the average family size was 2.98.

In the city, the population was spread out, with 24.7% under the age of 18, 7.2% from 18 to 24, 29.5% from 25 to 44, 21.7% from 45 to 64, and 16.9% who were 65 years of age or older. The median age was 38 years. For every 100 females, there were 89.8 males. For every 100 females age 18 and over, there were 86.5 males.

The median income for a household in the city was $71,162, and the median income for a family was $89,233. Males had a median earnings of $60,998 versus $41,389 for females. The per capita income for the city was $33,418. About 1.0% of families and 2.7% of the population were below the poverty line, including 1.8% of those under age 18 and 4.9% of those age 65 or over.

== Education ==
Oconomowoc schools are served by the Oconomowoc Area School District (OASD). Elementary schools (grades Pre-K through 4th) include: Greenland Elementary, Summit Elementary, Park Lawn Elementary, Meadow View Elementary, and Ixonia Elementary. Oconomowoc has two middle schools, Silver Lake and Nature Hill Intermediate school, which serve students in 5th through 8th grades. These opened for the 2008–2009 year, replacing the older Oconomowoc Middle School. As of the 2018–2019 school year, Oconomowoc High School had 1,715 students.

St. Matthew's Lutheran School is a Christian 3K–8 grade school of the Wisconsin Evangelical Lutheran Synod in Oconomowoc.

Holy Trinity Lutheran School is a Christian 2K–8 grade school of the Evangelical Lutheran Synod in Oconomowoc.

== Transportation ==
Primary automobile transportation is provided by highways 16, 67, and I-94. Highway 16 runs from Pewaukee to La Crosse. The original route passes through downtown Oconomowoc; however, a bypass was built which goes around Lac La Belle to the north. Highway 67 runs from Beloit to Chillton. Interstate 94 provides access to Madison and Milwaukee.

=== Rail ===
Amtrak's Empire Builder and Borealis passenger trains passes through Oconomowoc, but they do not stop. The nearest Amtrak train station is Milwaukee Intermodal. Freight rail service is provided by Canadian Pacific Kansas City (CPKC), with the Watertown Subdivision.

Oconomowoc has previously had intercity passenger rail and commuter rail service at the Oconomowoc station.

=== Bus ===
Bus routes 904 and 905, operated by Waukesha Metro Transit, has its western terminus at the Collins & Cross Parking Lot station. The service offers daily rides between Oconomowoc and Milwaukee. This service will be eliminated in September 2025 leaving Oconomowoc without public transportation service.

== In popular culture ==
- The Wizard of Oz premiered at the Strand Theatre in Oconomowoc on August 12, 1939.

== La Belle Cemetery ==
La Belle Cemetery was the first cemetery in Oconomowoc. Originally called Henshall Place, it opened in 1851 on land that is now part of Fowler Park. It later moved to Walnut Street. When the grounds became overcrowded, Charles Sheldon donated land for a new cemetery, and in 1864 the Wisconsin Legislature approved the transfer of burials from Walnut Street to the current La Belle Cemetery grounds on Grove Street.

== Sister cities ==
- Dietzenbach, Hesse, Germany

== Historic sites ==
- Henry and Mary Schuttler house (1880) at 371 East Lisbon Road was designed by German born Milwaukee architect Charles A. Gombert
- Oconomowoc Lake Club is a country club founded in 1890
- Minnewoc an 1892 castle like residence razed in 2021
- designed Oconomowoc station built in 1896
- Knollward a mansion built in 1928
- Strand Theatre a theater where The Wizard of Oz premiered. It was closed in 1950s and razed in October 1969. Oz Plaza stands where the original theatre stood

== Notable people ==
- Henry M. Ackley, Wisconsin State Senator
- John M. Alberts, Wisconsin State Representative
- Charlie Berens, comedian and YouTube creator of the Manitowoc Minute
- Jill Briscoe, Evangelical author and speaker
- Stuart Briscoe, Evangelical author and speaker; former senior pastor of Elmbrook Church, the largest church in Wisconsin
- Timothy T. Cronin, U.S. Attorney
- Dirk J. Debbink, U.S. Navy Vice Admiral, Chief of Navy Reserve
- Glenn Derby, NFL player
- John Derby, NFL player
- Jake Dickert, American college football coach
- Steven Foti, Wisconsin politician
- Brian Hagedorn, Justice of the Wisconsin Supreme Court
- James Alexander Henshall, author on fishing and mayor of Oconomowoc from 1868–1870
- Edwin Hurlbut, lawyer and politician who named the Republican Party
- Byron L. Johnson, U.S. Representative from Colorado
- Frank Tenney Johnson, painter of the Old American West
- Lucille Kailer, operatic soprano
- John Kaiser, NFL player
- Joel Kleefisch, former WISN-TV reporter and Wisconsin state legislator
- Rebecca Kleefisch, former WISN-TV news anchor and Lieutenant Governor of Wisconsin (2011–2019); wife of Joel Kleefisch
- Jacki Lyden, former NPR reporter and author
- Curtis Mann, Wisconsin State Senator and businessman
- D. Henry Rockwell, Wisconsin State Representative and mayor of Oconomowoc from 1866–1867
- John S. Rockwell, founder of Oconomowoc
- Dorothea Rudnick, embryologist
- Harry G. Snyder, Wisconsin State Representative and Wisconsin Court of Appeals Judge
- Andy Thompson, MLB player
- Jane Wiedlin, rhythm guitarist of The Go-Go's, actress
