= Francis M. Whitehouse =

American architect

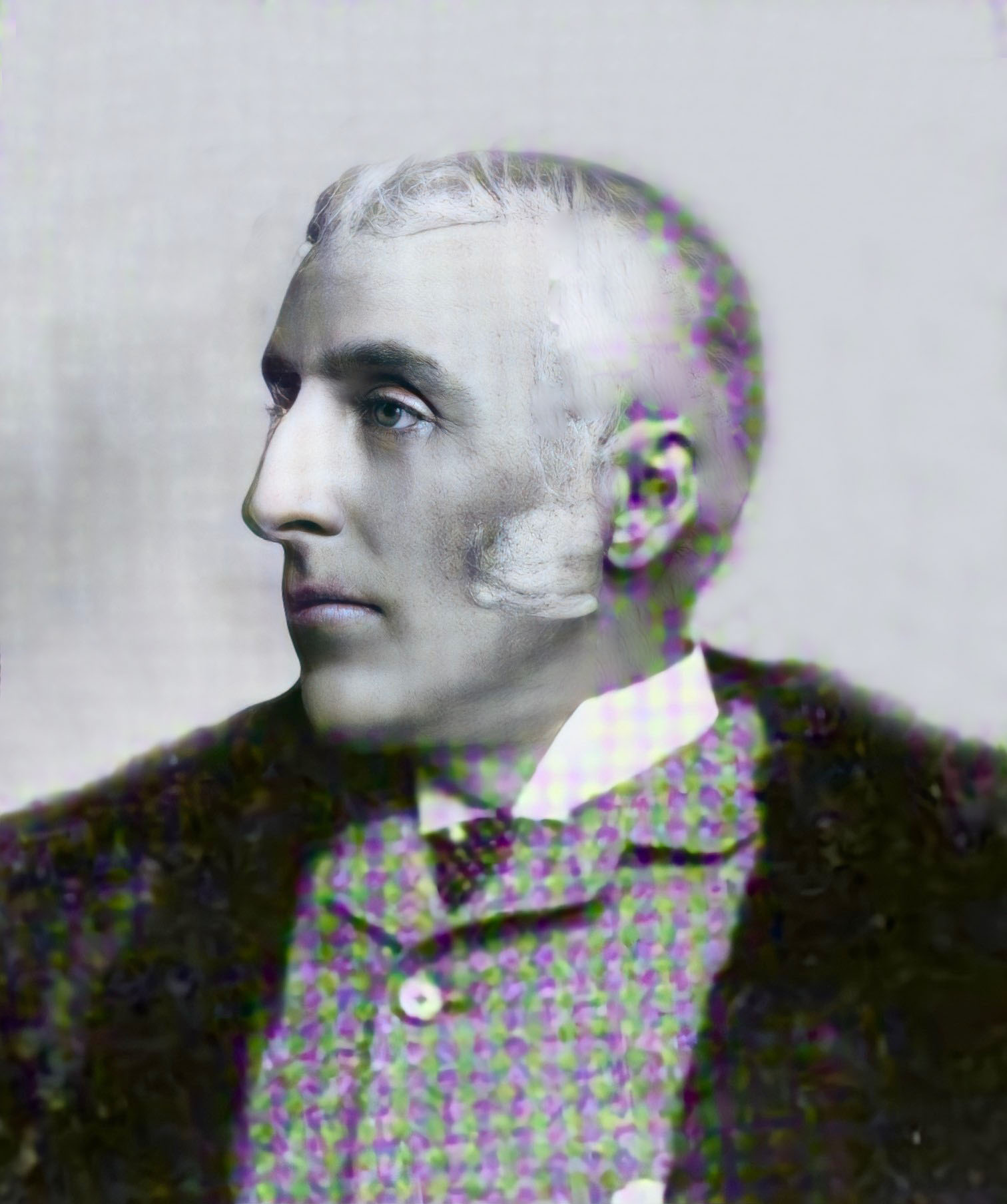
- Born: Francis Meredyth Whitehouse; October 2, 1848; New York City, US
- Died: March 8, 1938 (aged 89); Winter Park, Florida US
- Education: University of Gottingen
- Occupation: Architect
- Spouse: Mary née Armour
- Children: Meredyth Whitehouse
- Parent: Henry John Whitehouse
- Practice: Burling & Whitehouse; F.M. Whitehouse
- Buildings: Choral Building (Festival Hall) for the 1893 World's Columbian Exposition
- Design: Minnewoc

Francis Meredyth Whitehouse (October 2, 1848 - March 8, 1938) also known as F. M. Whitehouse was an architect from Chicago Illinois.

== Early life ==
Francis Meredyth Whitehouse was born in New York city on October 2, 1848. His father was Episcopal bishop Henry John Whitehouse. He studied architecture at the University of Göttingen in Germany.

== Career ==
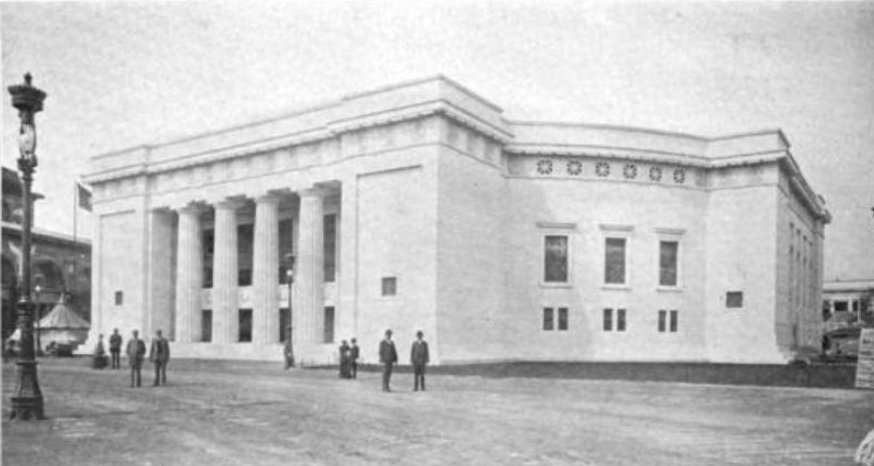
Festival Hall Columbian Exposition 1893

Whitehouse began his career as a draftsman for architect Edward Burling. He later became a junior partner in the firm. He helped design the Epiphany Episcopal Church in Chicago and the First National Bank Building. In 1889 he left the partnership and started his own firm. Whitehouse designed many mansion-type homes in the Chicago area especially on Lake Drive. He designed the Choral Building (Festival Hall) for the 1893 World's Columbian Exposition in Chicago.

== Personal ==
He was married to Mary née Armour and they had a son named Meredyth. Whitehouse enjoyed yachting and spent time at one of his estates in Manchester, Massachusetts. He died in Winter Park, Florida, on March 8, 1938.
