= Equal Suffrage League =

Equal Suffrage League may refer to:

- College Equal Suffrage League
- Equal Suffrage League (Brooklyn)
- Equal Suffrage League (St. Louis)
- Equal Suffrage League of Virginia (1909–1920)
