= Americans for Job Security =

American pro-business league

- Formation: November 1, 1997
- Dissolved: September 9, 2016
- Tax ID no.: 52-2062978

Americans for Job Security (AJS) is a Virginia-based pro-business league. The group has operated since 1997 and runs issue advertisements nationwide. In September 2019 the FEC reached a conciliation agreement with AJS, requiring them to register as a political committee and disclose their donors.

== History and related organizations ==
Michael Dubke, David Carney, and several business groups helped start Americans for Job Security in 1997. Carney was political director for President George H. W. Bush, and Dubke was the first executive director and then president of Americans for Job Security until April 2008, when Stephen DeMaura, recruited by Carney, took over.

In 2002, AJS ran over $1 million in advertising attacking Democrat Jeanne Shaheen, who was running for the US Senate from NH in opposition to Republican John Sununu. In the 2008 rematch between Shaheen and Sununu, AJS again funded advertising attacking Shaheen. In 2012, it bought $8 million worth of ads opposing Obama's reelection.

Complaints have been filed with the Federal Election Commission stating that Americans for Job Security should lose its 501(c)(6) status, which is reserved for "business leagues and trade associations" rather than groups that seek to influence elections. In September 2019, the Federal Election Commission reached a conciliation agreement with AJS, requiring them to register as a political committee and disclose their donors, which they did on October 25, 2019.

Notable donors include:

- Peter Thiel – $500,000
- Richard and Helen Devos – $2 million
- Sheldon and Miriam Adelson – $500,000
- Robert McNair – $1,000,000

Notable corporate donors include:

- Continental Resources – $1 million
- Devon Energy and Devon Energy Production Corp – $3 million
- Hensel Phelps Construction – $2.93 million
- Penn National Gaming – $737,000
- US Sugar Corp – $750,000
- Wynn Resorts – $500,000
- Bass Pro Shops – $50,000
- Quicken Loans – $250,000

Previously known donors include Anthony Pritzker, Eli Broad, John Fisher and Charles Schwab. Schwab was known to have given millions to AJS, but the new information shows that he gave an additional $2.15 million.

In April 2018, watchdog groups filed complaints with the Internal Revenue Service against Americans for Job Security for failure to comply with federal rules governing nonprofits by not filing its taxes in over three years. Americans For Job Security's 501(c)(6) status was revoked by the Internal Revenue Service on June 1, 2018, retroactive to March 15, 2018.

== Operation Trenchcoat ==
In Alaska, the Pebble Mine proposal was opposed for endangering commercial fishing, and supported for creating jobs. Alaskan financier Robert Gillam paid $2 million to join AJS, as encouraged to by Dubke, expecting the money to be used to oppose the mine. Instead, AJS passed almost all of it onto another nonprofit, Alaskans for Clean Water, set up to push a ballot initiative, Alaska Clean Water Initiative, 2008, aimed at imposing clean-water restrictions on the mine, by a group that included Art Hackney, a local Republican consultant and board member of AJS. The Alaska Public Offices Commission investigated, and AJS paid a $20,000 settlement without admitting guilt, agreeing not to help anyone make anonymous contributions in the future which involved Alaska elections, but without the agreement applying to other states.
