= Pebble (disambiguation) =

A pebble is a small clast of rock.

Pebble may also refer to:

== Products ==
- Pebble (watch), a smartwatch for iPhone and Android
- Pebble (social network), the social network formerly named T2 Social

== Places ==
- Pebble Island, Falkland Islands
  - Pebble Island Settlement
- Pebble, Nebraska, ghost town
- Pebble Beach, California
- Pebble Township (disambiguation), two places in the United States
- Pebble Mine, a mineral exploration project in the Bristol Bay region of Southwest Alaska

== Fictional characters ==
- Pearl Pebble, mother of animated character Wilma Flintstone
- Wilma Pebble, birth name of animated character Wilma Flintstone

== See also ==
- Pebbles (disambiguation)
- Pibble
- Motorola PEBL, a cell phone (mobile phone)
