= Oconomowoc High School =

Location
- 641 E. Forest St. Oconomowoc, Wisconsin 53066; United States; 43°05′58″N 88°29′23″W

Information
- Type: High School
- Established: 1923
- School district: Oconomowoc Area School District
- Principal: Jason Curtis
- Teaching staff: 106.45 (FTE)
- Grades: 9–12
- Enrollment: 1,633 (2023–2024)
- Student to teacher ratio: 15.34
- Color
- Athletics conference: Wisconsin Classic 8
- Mascot: Rocky Raccoon
- Nickname: Raccoons
- Rival: Arrowhead High School
- National ranking: 1,721 (2024)
- Graduating class size: 412
- Website: www.oasd.k12.wi.us/schools/high/
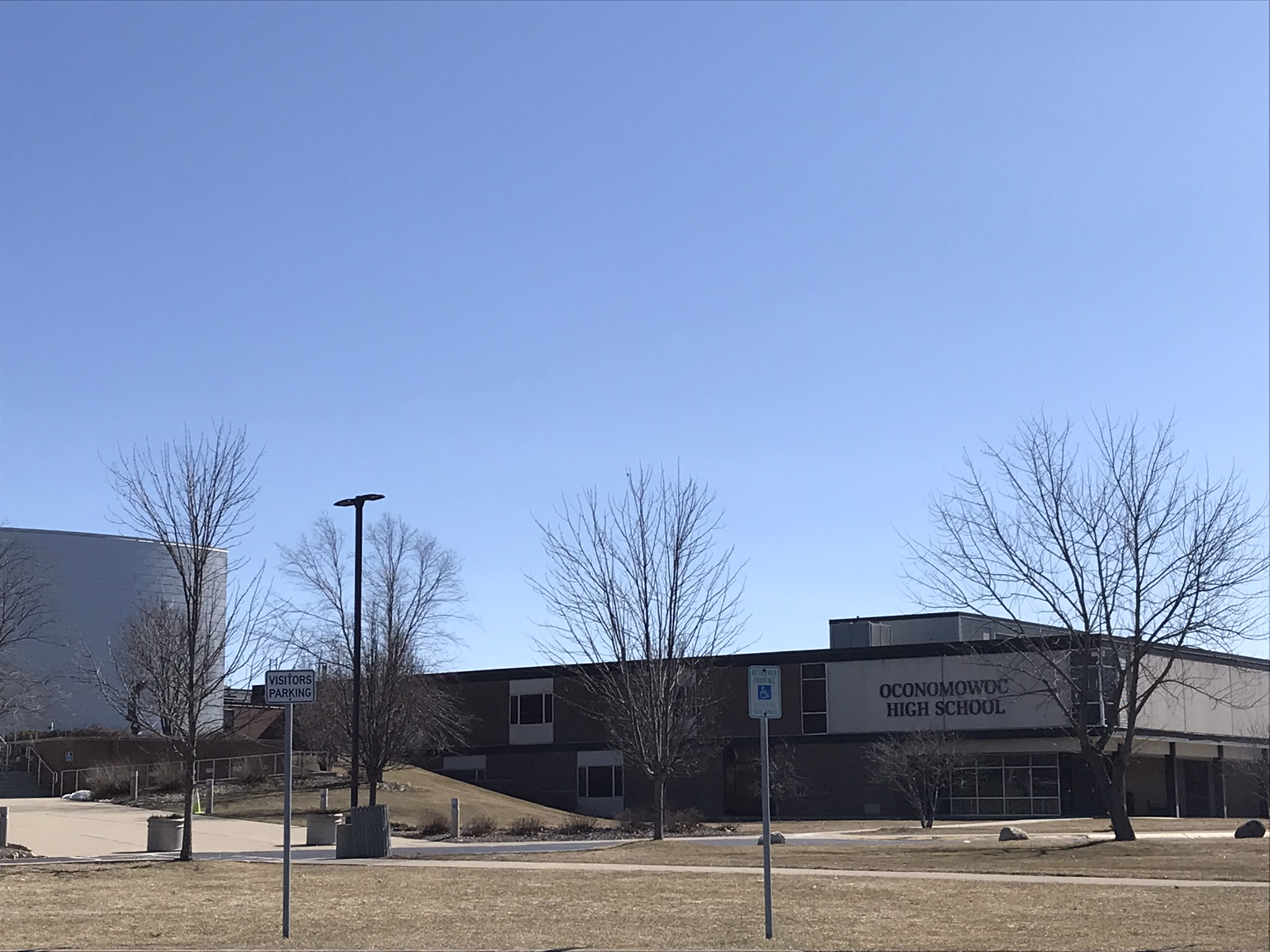
- Oconomowoc High School

Oconomowoc High School is a public high school located in Oconomowoc, Wisconsin, United States. It is part of the Oconomowoc Area School District. As of the 2021–22 school year, it had 1,686 students.

== History ==
The old Oconomowoc High School was built in 1923. The La Crosse-based architectural firm Parkinson & Dockendorff designed the original building. Additions to the school included an auditorium in 1938–1939, a 1950 classroom expansion, a 1955 gymnasium, and a dedicated music department in 1958.

The present Oconomowoc High School was built in the 1960s and originally had a main section of the building housing two gymnasiums, library, small theater and classrooms for art, music, technical education, business education, industrial arts and home economics. Two identical wings extended out from the main build which were called North Campus and South Campus. Each wing contained the administrative office area, guidance area and classrooms for language arts, mathematics, social studies, science and foreign languages. The school has been added onto multiple times over the years. In the 1990s, the additions included a middle wing housing administrative offices, student services offices and classrooms housing computer education and upper level science classrooms. Also in the first decade of the 21st century, further additions were added to include a large performing arts center and a state of the art field house.

Oconomowoc's mascot is Rocky, a raccoon. The mascot was formerly named Cooney, which was changed due to the negative connotation of that word. As of 2018, the name was still being used in connection with Oconomowoc athletics.

In March 2018, principal Joseph Moylan resigned after community outrage regarding a Dr. Martin Luther King Jr. Day event held by the school. Superintendent Roger Rindo was ordered by the school board to no longer discuss privilege. "Schools are a microcosm of their communities. And we had parents in our community who felt like the concept of privilege went a little far, particularly for some of our younger students," Rindo said.

== Service area ==
Within Waukesha County, the school serves Oconomowoc, Oconomowoc Lake, the county's portion of Lac La Belle, most of Summit, and most of Okauchee Lake. Within Jefferson County, it serves Ixonia and that county's section of Lac La Belle. Within Dodge County it serves Ashippun.

== Interscholastic sports ==
=== Wisconsin Little Ten All-Sport Champions ===
The Wisconsin Little Ten Conference has been appointing All-Sport Champions since the 2004–2005 school year. Oconomowoc High School has won six times, including five consecutive wins from 2011 through 2016.

WLT All-Sport Champion	Year
Oconomowoc	2005–2006
Oconomowoc	2011–2012
Oconomowoc	2012–2013
Oconomowoc	2013–2014
Oconomowoc	2014–2015
Oconomowoc	2015–2016

=== Classic 8 Conference ===
Beginning with the 2017–2018 school year, Oconomowoc High School joined the Wisconsin Classic 8 conference, as part of a major athletics realignment that affected most of Southeastern Wisconsin. As a result of the realignment, the Wisconsin Little Ten Conference was disbanded.

=== Football ===
On September 27, 2013, Oconomowoc football was recognized statewide and garnered national interest, as the Raccoons (5–0) faced the Wisconsin Lutheran Vikings (3–2) in Oconomowoc's homecoming game. History was made when Oconomowoc beat Wisconsin Lutheran 84–82 in regulation. The teams combined for 166 total points, surpassing the previous state record of 133 points. Oconomowoc quarterback Canton Larson scored 8 touchdowns, including a 493-yard performance, combined through the air and on the ground. The game showcased the best the Wisconsin Little Ten Conference had to offer, with 25 combined All-Conference players. In its 2013 campaign, the Oconomowoc football program led a memorable season, winning the conference for the first time since 2002, while going undefeated during the regular season. They lost in a state quarterfinal match-up against Mukwonago, finishing the year with a record of 11–1.

Much of Oconomowoc's football dominance came under legendary coach Ed Rux. In his 33-year tenure beginning in 1967, Rux led Oconomowoc to 216 victories. He oversaw ten conference titles, including a trip to the Division 1 state finals in 1987. He was inducted into the Wisconsin Football Coaches Association Hall of Fame in 1999, the year of his retirement. In 2014, the OHS football stadium was renovated and renamed; it is now known as the Ed Rux Stadium.

In current football history, Oconomowoc has not had much success with claiming only one playoff appearance since joining the classic 8. This came under the team’s new head coach, Sal Logue, who proceeded Greg Malling. The playoff appearance came in the 2021-22 season after the Raccoons finished 5-4 overall and 3-4 in conference. Their notable win came on September 18, 2022 after the Raccoons beat #1 Muskego 21-14, snapping their 41 game win streak. The Raccoons later lost to Muskego in round one of the WIAA State Tournament 35-0 bringing their overall record to 5-5.

=== Baseball ===
The Raccoons have been a successful baseball program since the 1900s. The baseball program has won conference 25 times, including 14 trips to the state tournament. William Martin led Oconomowoc to their first state championship in 1959. They defeated Tomahawk 10–0, Monona Grove 7–3, and Fond du Lac 2–1 to win the title. Pat Neary took over varsity baseball in 1984 and picked up where Martin left off. The Raccoons were conference champions in 1984, 1985, and 1986. They were state runners-up in 1991 and 1996. Neary coached Oconomowoc baseball for 41 years (2 as freshman, 12 as junior varsity and 27 as varsity). He held a varsity record of 339–230. Neary was inducted into the Wisconsin Baseball Coaches Hall of Fame in 2007. He retired after the 2010 season. Arno Kirchewitz became Neary's successor in 2011 and retired in 2022. Former rival Arrowhead High School coach Vincent Mancuso took over as head coach in 2022 and is currently remaining at the head position. Notable players to come out of Oconomowoc include J.T. Bruett, Sean Smith, Pete Schlosser, Bob Anderson, Andy Neary, Luke Nelson, Logan Wonn, Zach Clayton, and Ryan Brennecke.

=== Volleyball ===
The Oconomowoc Raccoons volleyball team won the WIAA State Championship against Appleton North on November 6, 2021. This was the first time in Oconomowoc High School history that the volleyball team won the state championship. Oconomowoc ended the regular season 35–5, and never lost a set in the sectionals and state playoffs.

== Clubs and organizations ==
=== Best Buddies ===
Oconomowoc High School Best Buddies is part of an international nonprofit organization, Best Buddies. It consists of student volunteers that create opportunities for students with intellectual and developmental disabilities. The Best Buddies program's main purpose is to allow volunteers to be paired up with a buddy with a disability and provide them with a friend and show them real life skills. Best Buddies has been a part of Oconomowoc High School since 2007, and has more than 70 student participants.

=== High School Players ===
The Oconomowoc High School Players is part of the theater department at Oconomowoc High School. Located in a community that supports the arts, the Oconomowoc High School Players is an accomplished high school theater department, as demonstrated by its earning 15 Tommy Awards in 2014 for their production of Hairspray. This was their fourth Outstanding Musical win in the past five years.

=== Grilling to Give ===
Grilling to Give started in 2003 giving students and the community a chance to hang out and listen to local bands or high school classmates perform, while enjoying a meal hosted by the marketing class. About eighty students are involved in planning and producing the annual event. Every year the club donates the proceeds from the event to one or more charitable or non-profit organizations, both local and national. As of 2018, the group has raised more than $79,000 benefitting approximately twenty different organizations. The 2017 event raised more than $10,000. Grilling to Give is open to the community. The lunch includes a burger (veggie or regular), a hot dog or brat, chips, a cookie, and a soda.

== Notable alumni ==
- Dirk J. Debbink, retired Vice Admiral in the United States Navy and former Chief of the Navy Reserve
- Glenn Derby, NFL player
- John Derby, NFL player
- Eduardo Dolhun, physician, lecturer, founder of DripDrop
- Steven Foti, former Wisconsin State Assembly majority leader
- Frank Tenney Johnson, painter of the Old American West
- Jacki Lyden, journalist
- Kenneth C. Millett, emeritus professor, University of California, Santa Barbara, and fellow of the American Mathematical Society
- Sam Siefkes, Linebackers coach of the Green Bay Packers
- Harry G. Snyder, retired judge of the Wisconsin Court of Appeals
- Stanley Starosta, linguist
- Fred Sturm, jazz composer and arranger
- Steve Wagner, NFL player
- Luke Venne, Head coach of Wisconsin–Stevens Point Pointers football
