= Peebles (disambiguation) =

Peebles is a town in Scotland.

Peebles may also refer to:

- Peebles (Parliament of Scotland constituency), pre-1707
- Peebles (surname)
- Peebles (store), a defunct department store chain in the eastern United States
- Peebles, Ohio
- Peebles, Saskatchewan, an organized hamlet in Canada
- Peebles, Wisconsin, an unincorporated community
- Peebles' Corner Historic District, Cincinnati, Ohio
- SS Peebles or SS Gracechurch, a cargo steamship built in 1930 and torpedoed in 1940
- SS Peebles (1911), a shipwreck in October 1917
- Peebles, New Zealand, a place in North Otago
- Peebles Hospital, the main public hospital in the British Virgin Islands
- Peebles House, listed on the National Register of Historic Places in North Carolina
- Princess Bubblegum, whose nickname is Peebles in the animated television series Adventure Time, such as the nineteenth episode "Lady & Peebles", of which "Peebles" in the episode title.

== See also ==
- County of Peebles (disambiguation)
- Pebbles (disambiguation)
