= Fog (2022 film) =

2022 short documentary film

Fog is a 2022 documentary short film, featuring stories and portraits from the homeless in San Francisco. The film is directed by DreamWorks’ Michael Pedraza and written by James Mihaley, with executive producer Eduardo Dolhun. It includes original music by Bob Weir, co-founder of the Grateful Dead, Joe Satriani, 15-time Grammy Award nominee, and Kevin De León. Sound editing was performed by Skywalker Sound's Academy Award nominated Dennis Leonard.

Fog won the 2022 UNAFF Grand Jury Award for Best Short Documentary.

== Background ==
Dr. Eduardo Dolhun is a family physician from Wisconsin who practices in San Francisco. He passes the homeless every day on his walk to work. He began interacting and providing basic health care to people living on the street. Eventually he started interviewing and photographing the homeless he interacted with. The photographs and interviews were then turned into the film.

The film premiered alongside an outdoor exhibition of thirty-one larger-than-life photographs were on public display in San Francisco from December 2021 to February 2022.

== Festival selections ==
- United Nations Association Film Festival, October 2022
- Urban Mediamakers Film Festival, October 2022
- BendFilm Festival, October 2022
- Global Peace Film Festival, September 2022
- LA Shorts Film Festival, July 2022
- Thomas Edison Film Festival, February 2022
- Sedona International Film Festival, February 2022
