= Pebbles =

Pebbles is the plural form of the word "pebble".

Pebbles may also refer to:

== People ==
- Pebbles (radio personality) (born 1964), Boston-area radio DJ
- Anthony Rocca (born 1977), Australian rules footballer commonly referred to as "Pebbles"
- Pebbles (musician) (Perri Reid, born 1964), American dance-pop and urban contemporary singer-songwriter

=== Fictional characters ===
- Pebbles Flintstone, a character in The Flintstones animated television show

== Groups and organizations ==
- The Pebbles, a Belgian rock band active 1965–1974
- Pebbles Project, a humanitarian project in South Africa

== Music ==
- Pebbles (series), dozens of albums of 1960s garage rock music compiled and released by AIP and BFD Records from the late 1970s to the mid-2000s
- Pebbles (Pebbles album), 1987 by Pebbles (Perri Reid)
- "Pebbles", a song by Bug Hunter from the album Bigger Than Myself

== Other uses ==
- Pebbles (film), a 2021 Indian film
- Pebbles (horse) (1981–2005), British-trained thoroughbred racehorse of the 1980s
- The Pebbles (house), an Australian heritage-listed residence
- Pebbles cereal, a sweetened rice cereal featuring a Flintstones theme, named after the fictional character "Pebbles Flintstone"
- "Pebbles", an episode of the television series Teletubbies

== See also ==
- Pebble (disambiguation)
- Peebles (disambiguation)
