= Six Mile Lake (Alaska) =

Lake in the state of Alaska, United States

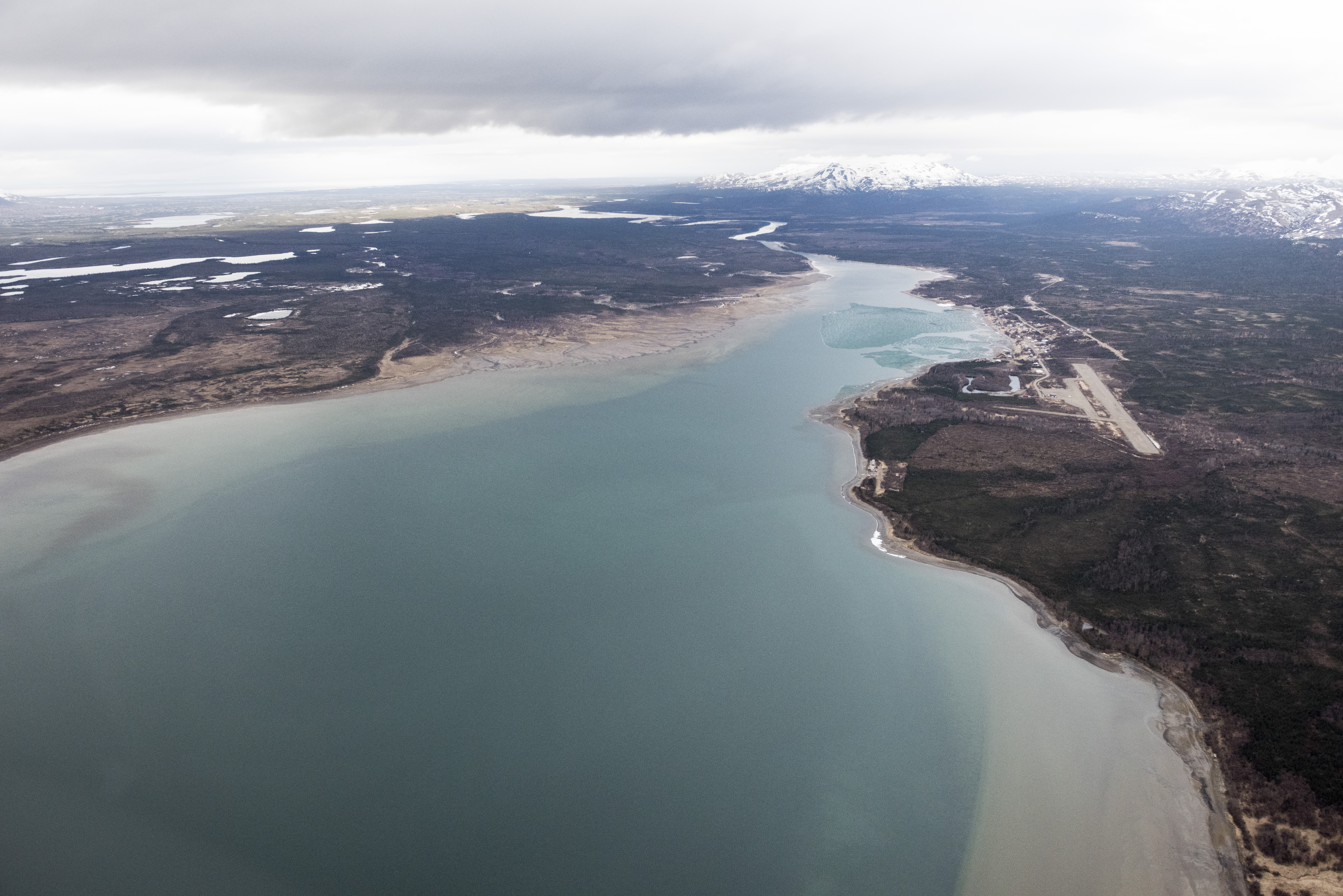

- Location within Alaska Location within North America
- Location: Lake and Peninsula Borough, Alaska, U.S.
- Coordinates: 59°58′51″N 154°48′12″W
- Type: Lake
- Primary outflows: Newhalen River
- Basin countries: United States
- Max. length: 5 km (3.1 mi)
- Max. width: 1 km (0.62 mi)

Six Mile Lake is a lake in southern Alaska between Lake Clark and Iliamna Lake. The Newhalen River drains Six Mile Lake into Iliamna Lake. The lake is about 5 km (3.1 mi) long and about 1 km (3/4 mile) wide. The very small city of Nondalton, populated by Native Alaskans but not connected by road, lies on the lake's western shores.

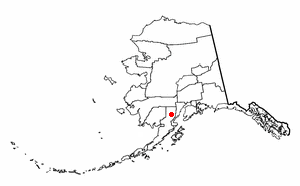
Location of Nondalton, Alaska
