= DripDrop ORS =

Oral rehydration therapy

- Type: Private
- Founded: San Francisco, California
- Founder: Eduardo Dolhun
- Headquarters: United States
- Products: Oral rehydration solution powder
- Website: dripdrop.com

DripDrop is an oral rehydration solution company, based in Oakland, CA. Eduardo Dolhun founded the company in 2008 and began manufacturing in 2010. In practice, DripDrop ORS is used as a part of oral rehydration therapy.

== History ==
Dolhun became interested in oral rehydration therapy while he was in Guatemala during a cholera outbreak in 1993. Dolhun began developing the DripDrop formula in 2007 and finalized it in 2010. Dolhun tested oral rehydration therapy mixtures of sugars and salts on his patients at his private practice, Dolhun Clinic, in San Francisco, California. DripDrop received US Patent #8557301 in 2013.

Funding rounds raised $3 million in August 2013 and $5.6 million in August 2014.

DripDrop won the bronze in the "treatments" category of the Edison Awards in 2014.

== Philanthropy ==
Proceeds from sales of DripDrop support the company's philanthropic efforts.

Through the medical not-for-profit organization Doctors Outreach, DripDrop has been used around the world in disaster and relief settings including Haiti and Pakistan in 2010, the Philippines in 2013, Nepal in 2015, Greece and Ecuador in 2016, and Houston and South Africa in 2017, Costa Rica and South Africa in 2020, Campeche and Kentucky in 2021, and Ukraine in 2022.

DripDrop was used to treat Ebola in Sierra Leone and Liberia by ChildFund International.

== Description ==
DripDrop ORS is designed to promote rehydration and electrolyte replacement in ill children, based on the American Academy of Pediatrics (AAP) Committee on Nutrition requirements to help prevent dehydration in infants and children. The product is similar to rehydration fluids used by the World Health Organization that are used to treat illnesses such as cholera and rotavirus.

Various academic organizations recommend DripDrop for treating short bowel syndrome.

In 2022, DripDrop Zero was released, a zero-sugar version of the ORS.
