= Pipersville, Wisconsin =

- Unincorporated community
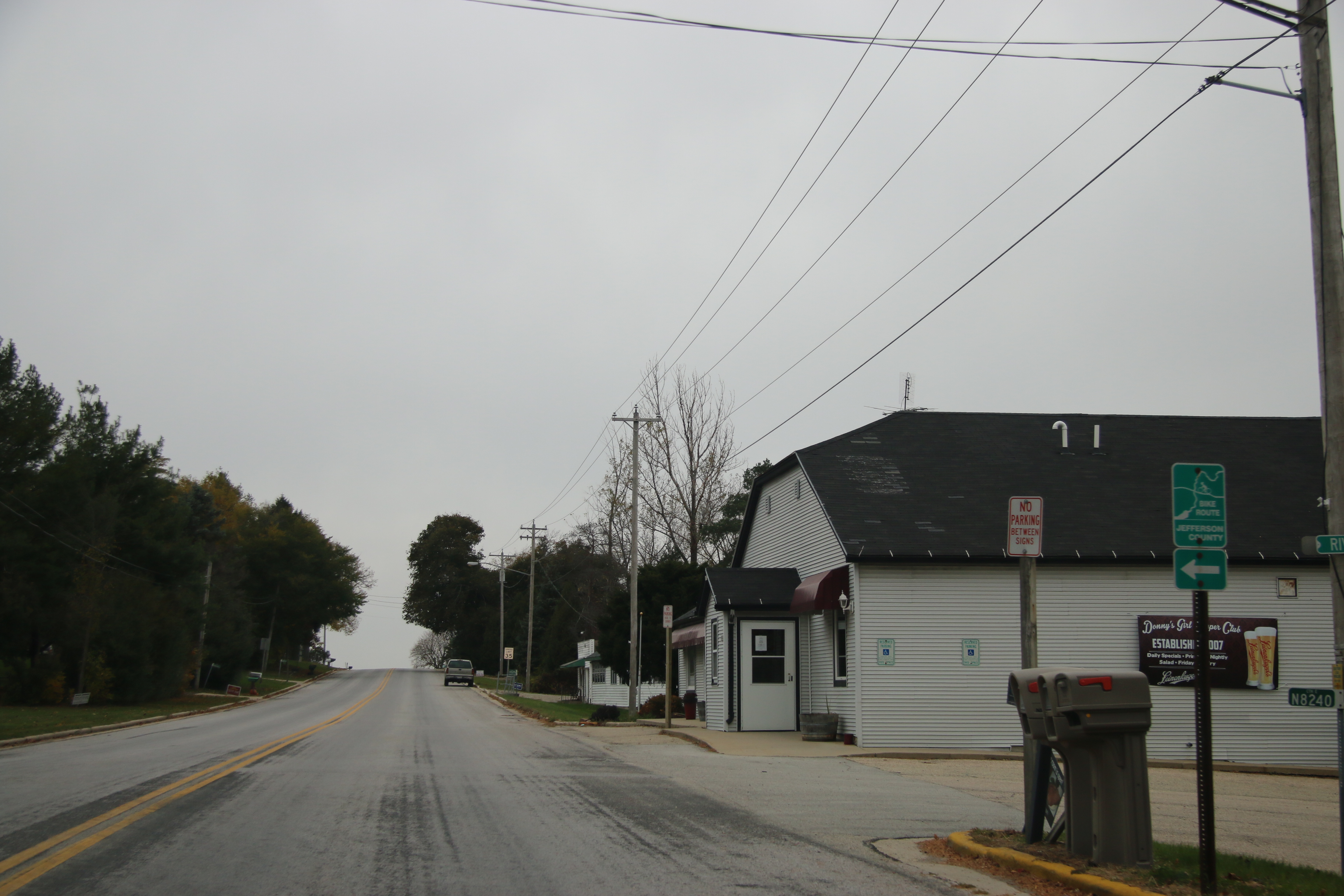
- Downtown Pipersville

- Location within Wisconsin Location within the United States
- Coordinates: 43°08′32″N 88°39′00″W
- Country: United States
- State: Wisconsin
- County: Jefferson
- Town: Ixonia
- Elevation: 883 ft (269 m)
- Time zone: UTC-6 (Central (CST))
  - Summer (DST): UTC-5 (CDT)
- Area code: 920
- GNIS feature ID: 1571557

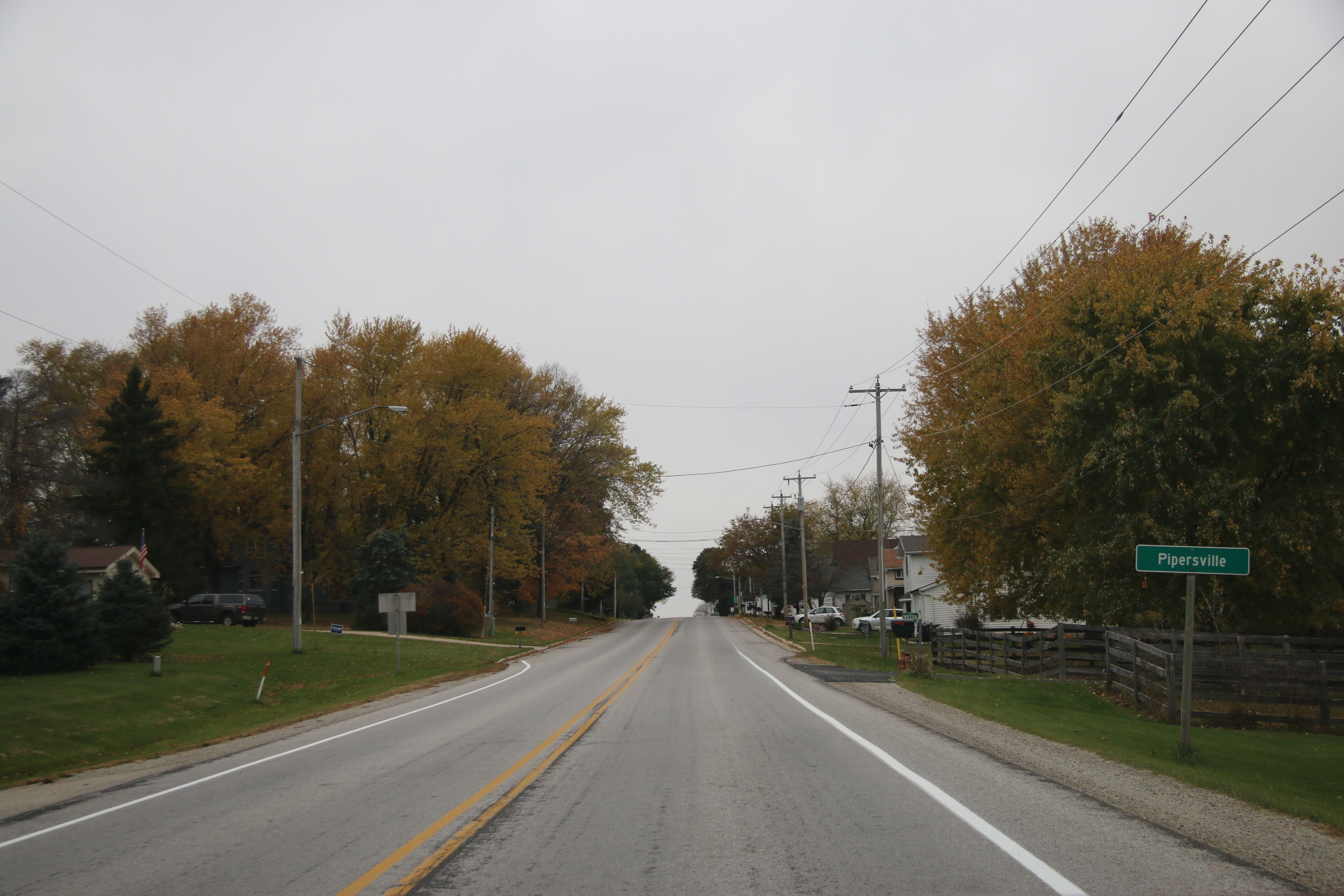
Sign for Pipersville

Pipersville is an unincorporated community in the town of Ixonia in Jefferson County, Wisconsin, United States. It is located at the intersection of Jefferson County Roads P and E, approximately four miles southeast of Watertown.
