= St. Nicholas Chapel (Nondalton, Alaska) =

Historic church in Alaska, United States

- U.S. National Register of Historic Places
- Alaska Heritage Resources Survey
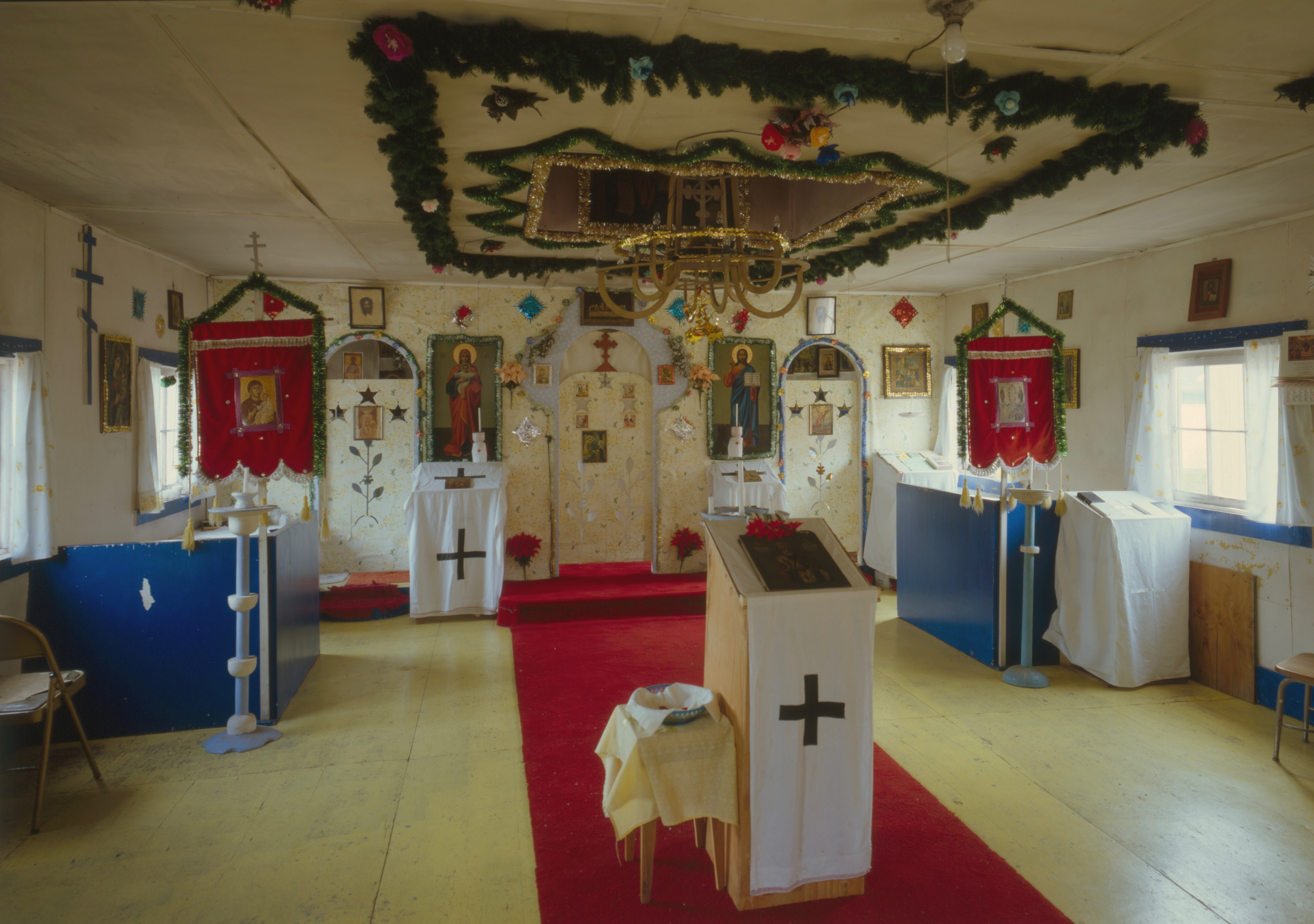
- HABS photo of chapel interior, 1990

- Location within Alaska
- Location: Along 2nd Avenue, Nondalton, Alaska
- Coordinates: 59°58′24″N 154°50′55″W
- Area: less than one acre
- MPS: Russian Orthodox Church Buildings and Sites TR
- NRHP reference No.: 80000751
- AHRS No.: ILI-023

Significant dates
- Added to NRHP: June 6, 1980
- Designated AHRS: May 18, 1973

The St. Nicholas Chapel is a historic Russian Orthodox church in the Alaska Native village of Nondalton, Alaska, United States. It is now under the Diocese of Alaska of the Orthodox Church in America.

The congregation was established in 1896 at Old Nondalton, and its first building was constructed in that year. The current building dates to the 1920s, and was moved when the whole community of Nondalton moved to its present location. It is roughly rectangular in shape, measuring 37 by 25 feet (11.3 m × 7.6 m), with a truncated octagonal extension at the eastern end, where the altar is located. Most of the building is topped by a gable roof; the altar area is topped by a pyramidal section. The building has survived a number of fires that swept the community.

The building was listed on the National Register of Historic Places in 1980.

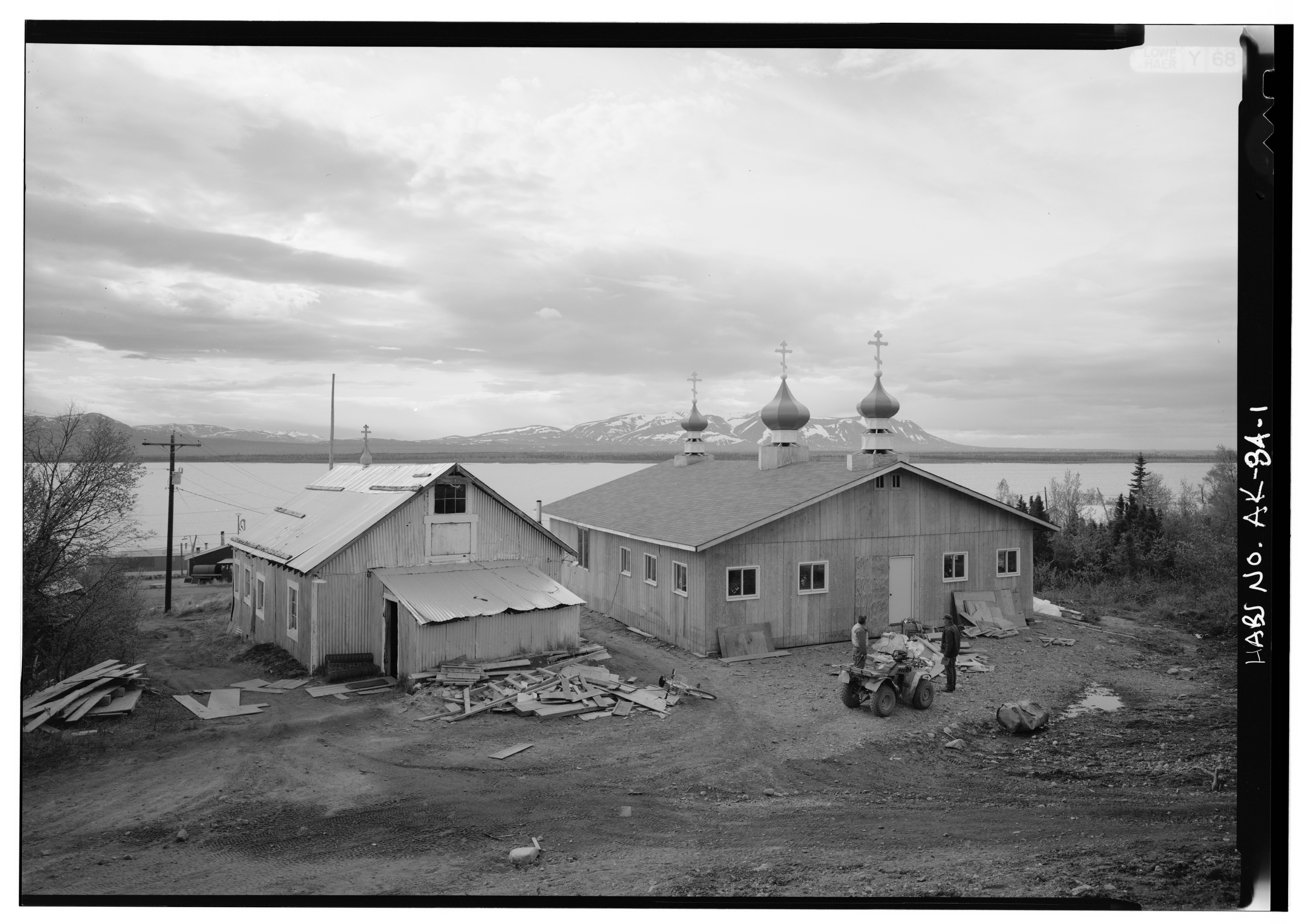
North side and west front of the church

== See also ==
- National Register of Historic Places listings in Lake and Peninsula Borough, Alaska
