= Nondalton, Alaska =

Town in Alaska, United States

Nondalton, Alaska Nuvendaltun / Nundaltin
- Town
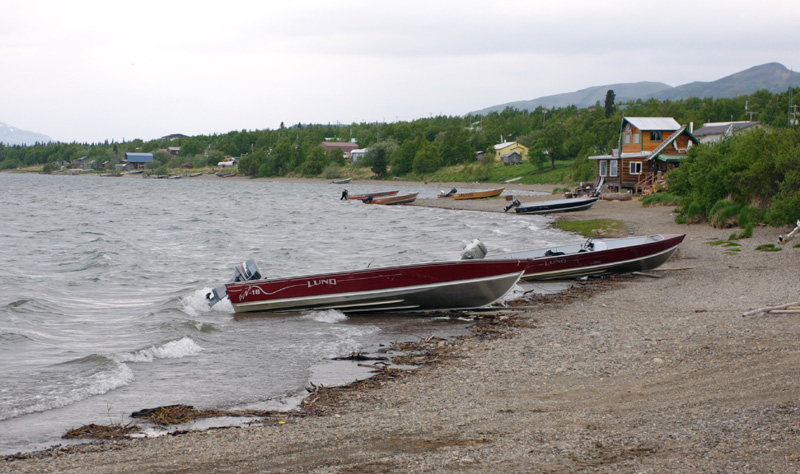
- Nondalton Village on Six Mile Lake

- Location in Alaska
- Coordinates: 59°58′1″N 154°51′6″W
- Country: United States
- State: Alaska
- Borough: Lake and Peninsula
- Incorporated: May 18, 1971

Government
  - Mayor: Joanna Trefon
  - State senator: Lyman Hoffman (D)
  - State rep.: Bryce Edgmon (I)

Area
  - Total: 7.01 sq mi (18.16 km^{2})
  - Land: 6.74 sq mi (17.45 km^{2})
  - Water: 0.27 sq mi (0.70 km^{2})
- Elevation: 260 ft (80 m)

Population (2020)
  - Total: 133
  - Density: 19.7/sq mi (7.62/km^{2})
- Time zone: UTC-9 (Alaska (AKST))
  - Summer (DST): UTC-8 (AKDT)
- ZIP code: 99640
- Area code: 907
- FIPS code: 02-55030
- GNIS feature ID: 1407129

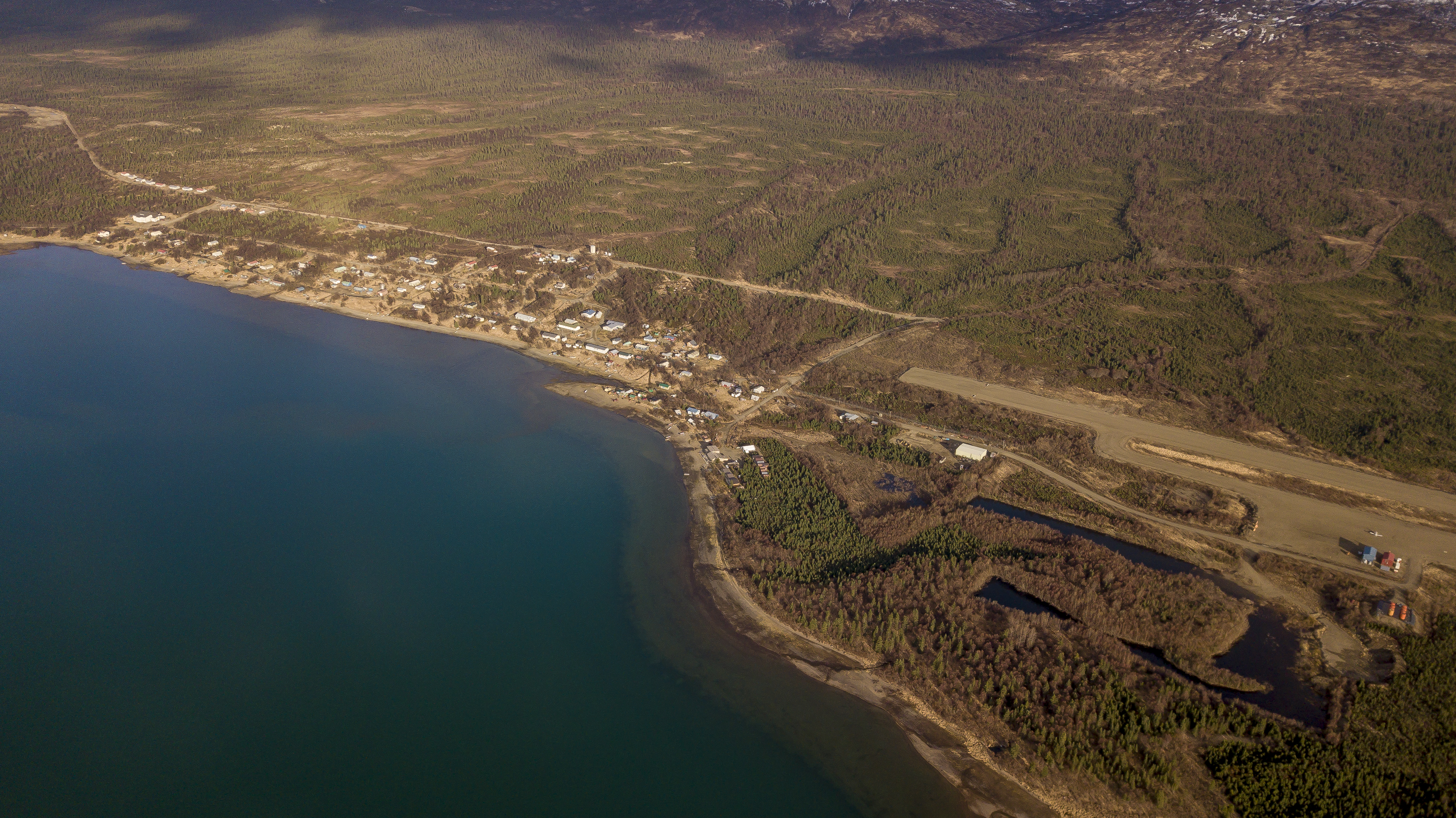
Aerial view of Nondalton Village

Nondalton (Dena'ina: Nuvendaltun or Nundaltin) is a town on the west shore of Six Mile Lake in the Lake and Peninsula Borough, Alaska, United States. At the 2020 census, the population was 133, down from 164 in 2010.

== Geography ==
Nondalton is located at 59°58′1″N 154°51′6″W (59.967015, -154.851636).

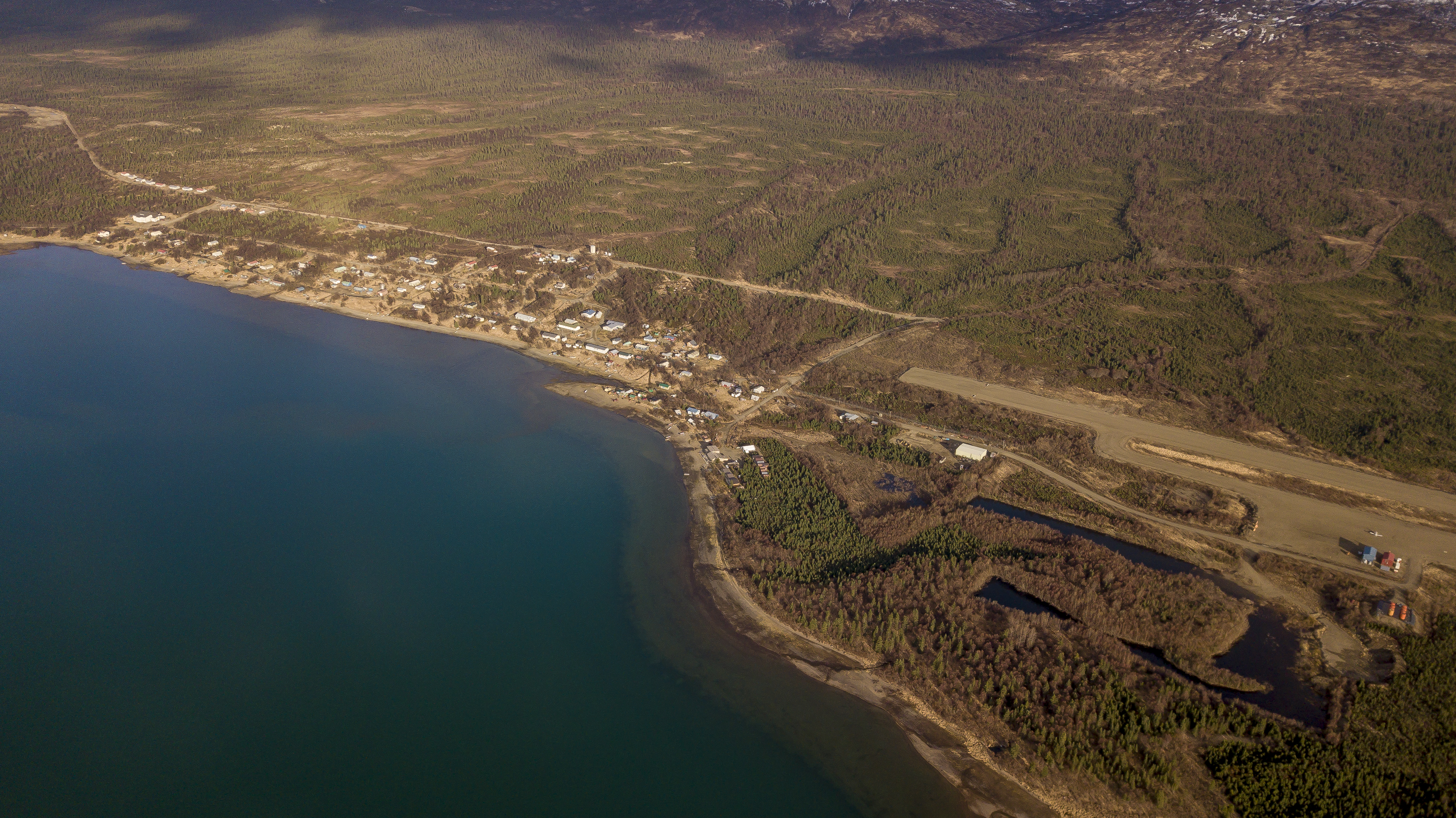

According to the United States Census Bureau, the village has a total area of 8.8 square miles (23 km^{2}), of which 8.4 square miles (22 km^{2}) is land and 0.4 square miles (1.0 km^{2}) (4.57%) is water.

== Demographics ==
Historical population
Census	Pop.	Note	%±
1920	69		—
1930	24		−65.2%
1940	82		241.7%
1950	103		25.6%
1960	205		99.0%
1970	184		−10.2%
1980	173		−6.0%
1990	178		2.9%
2000	221		24.2%
2010	164		−25.8%
2020	133		−18.9%
U.S. Decennial Census

Nondalton first appeared on the 1920 U.S. Census as an unincorporated village. This was the original Nondalton village, approximately 2 miles north of the present village. The original site became Old Nondalton. Residents relocated in 1940 to the present location of Nondalton. It formally incorporated in 1971.

As of the census of 2000, there were 221 people, 68 households, and 49 families residing in the city. The population density was 26.4 inhabitants per square mile (10.2/km^{2}). There were 120 housing units at an average density of 14.4 units per square mile (5.6 units/km^{2}). The racial makeup of the city was 9.50% White, 89.14% Native American, 0.45% Pacific Islander, and 0.90% from two or more races. 0.45% of the population were Hispanic or Latino of any race.

There were 68 households, of which 47.1% had children under the age of 18 living with them, 36.8% were married couples living together, 11.8% had a female householder with no husband present, and 27.9% were non-families. 23.5% of all households were made up of individuals, and 4.4% had someone living alone who was 65 years of age or older. The average household size was 3.25 and the average family size was 3.78.

In the city, the age distribution of the population shows 39.8% under the age of 18, 7.7% from 18 to 24, 29.9% from 25 to 44, 14.9% from 45 to 64, and 7.7% who were 65 years of age or older. The median age was 28 years. For every 100 females, there were 121.0 males. For every 100 females age 18 and over, there were 133.3 males.

The median income for a household in the city was $19,583, and the median income for a family was $20,694. Males had a median income of $27,500 versus $11,250 for females. The per capita income for the city was $8,411. About 37.3% of families and 45.4% of the population were below the poverty line, including 51.7% of those under the age of eighteen and 39.1% of those 65 or over.

== History ==
Nondalton is an Athabascan Indian (Tanaina and Iliamna) village. The name means "lake after lake" in their language: the village is situated along one of a line of lakes. Nondalton was first recorded in 1909. The village was originally located on the north shore of Six Mile Lake, but was moved to the present location in 1940, due to the depletion of wood and the growth of mud flats.

Subsistence hunting and fishing are the major economic activities. Government is by tribal council. There is a food store with a post office attached, a state-certified public school providing pre-kindergarten through 12th grade instruction, an outpatient medical clinic with family social services, a maintained Russian Orthodox church, a fishing lodge, and a water purification plant. Uncertified water is usually piped to most houses; septic tanks are used for sewage; and electric power and telephone service is available. Nondalton is on a boil drinking water notice indefinitely.

Nondalton is isolated: there are no highways or roads connecting it to other villages. The primary means of access and egress to the village is by airplane: a privately owned airport for single-engine craft services the village.

Among the issues affecting the village at the start of the 21st century is the proposed Pebble Mine site to the west and in the vicinity of nearby Lake Iliamna, likely to be mining copper, gold and molybdenum porphyry in the late 2020s. There are potential impacts on fishing grounds.

In addition, access to the community by land could be eased by a bridge over the Newhalen River, which would ease connection to the communities of Iliamna and Newhalen. There is a road along the Newhalen River to connect the communities, and it was later partially tarmaced, but the bridge was never completed. The Lake and Peninsula Borough would like it built, but local residents are not convinced, even though funding may be available from the US Infrastructure Investment and Jobs Act (2021). They fear increased exploitation of their village lands by incomers.
