= Ixonia (CDP), Wisconsin =

Census-designated place in Wisconsin, United States

Ixonia, Wisconsin
- Census-designated place
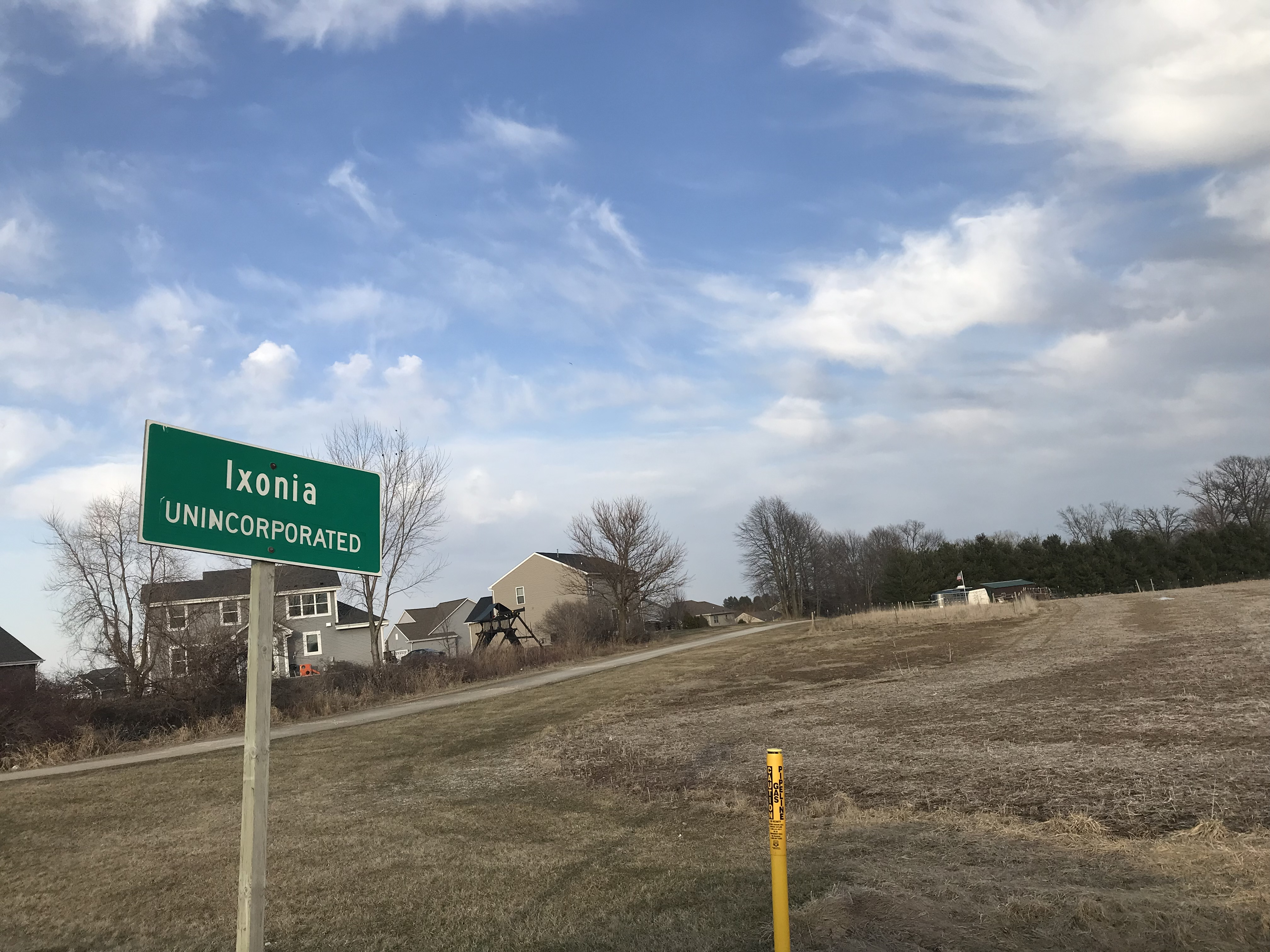

- Location within Wisconsin Location within the United States
- Coordinates: 43°08′38″N 88°35′50″W
- Country: United States
- State: Wisconsin
- County: Jefferson
- Town: Ixonia

Area
  - Total: 3.640 sq mi (9.43 km^{2})
  - Land: 3.638 sq mi (9.42 km^{2})
  - Water: 0.002 sq mi (0.0052 km^{2})
- Elevation: 856 ft (261 m)

Population (2020)
  - Total: 2,367
  - Density: 650.6/sq mi (251.2/km^{2})
- Time zone: UTC-6 (Central (CST))
  - Summer (DST): UTC-5 (CDT)
- GNIS feature ID: 2393065

Ixonia is a census-designated place (CDP) in the town of Ixonia, Jefferson County, Wisconsin, United States. The population was 2,367 at the 2020 census.

== Geography ==
Ixonia is located at 43°08′38″N 88°35′50″W (43.1438923, −88.5973230).

According to the United States Census Bureau, the CDP has a total area of 3.0 square miles (7.7 km^{2}), all land.

== Demographics ==
Historical population
Census	Pop.	Note	%±
2000	642		—
2010	1,624		153.0%
2020	2,367		45.8%
U.S. Decennial Census

As of the census of 2000, there were 642 people, 237 households, and 181 families residing in the CDP. The population density was 216.8 people per square mile (83.7/km^{2}). There were 248 housing units at an average density of 32.3 persons/km^{2} (83.7 persons/sq mi). The racial makeup of the CDP was 98.91% White, 0.16% Native American, 0.16% Asian, and 0.78% from two or more races. Hispanic or Latino of any race were 0.78% of the population.

There were 237 households, out of which 37.6% had children under the age of 18 living with them, 62.4% were married couples living together, 7.2% have a woman whose husband does not live with her, and 23.6% were non-families. 18.6% of all households were made up of individuals, and 6.8% had someone living alone who was 65 years of age or older. The average household size was 2.71 and the average family size was 3.10.

In the CDP, the population was spread out, with 28.0% under the age of 18, 7.9% from 18 to 24, 33.0% from 25 to 44, 21.3% from 45 to 64, and 9.7% who were 65 years of age or older. The median age was 34 years. For every 100 females, there were 110.5 males. For every 100 females age 18 and over, there were 105.3 males.

The median income for a household is $50,341, and the median income for a family was $55,781. Males had a median income of $40,912 versus $24,844 for females. The per capita income for the town was $21,509. 1.1% of the population and 1.6% of families were below the poverty line. Out of the total people living in poverty, 0.0% are under the age of 18 and 10.3% are 65 or older.
