= Ixonia, Wisconsin =

Town of Ixonia, Wisconsin
- Town
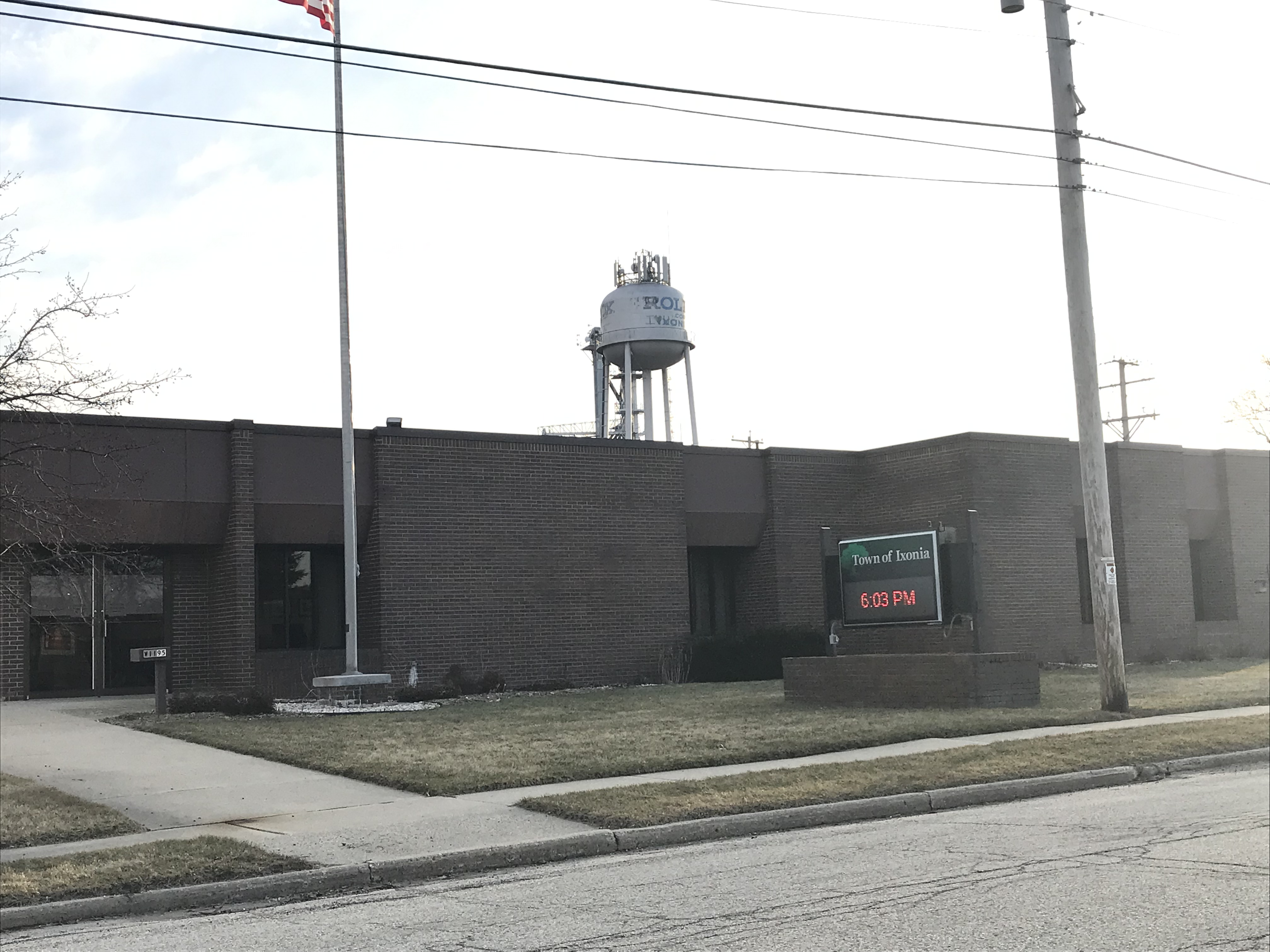
- Town hall

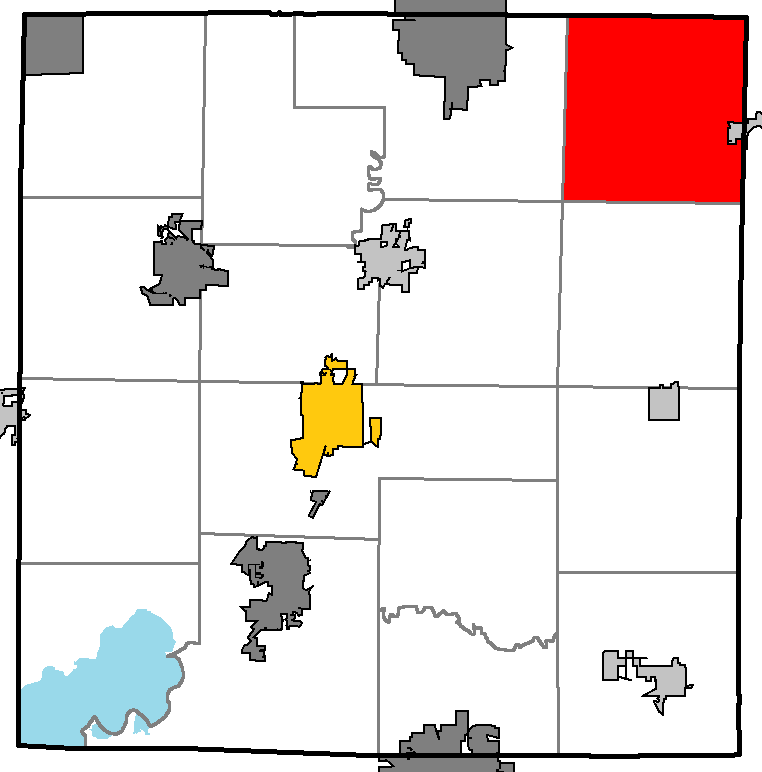
- Location of the Town of Ixonia, within Jefferson County
- Coordinates: 43°9′0″N 88°35′24″W
- Country: United States
- State: Wisconsin
- County: Jefferson
- Organized: January 21, 1846

Area
  - Total: 36.3 sq mi (93.9 km^{2})
  - Land: 35.8 sq mi (92.7 km^{2})
  - Water: 0.50 sq mi (1.3 km^{2})
- Elevation: 889 ft (271 m)

Population (2020)
  - Total: 5,120
  - Density: 143/sq mi (55.2/km^{2})
- Time zone: UTC-6 (Central (CST))
  - Summer (DST): UTC-5 (CDT)
- ZIP Code: 53036
- Area code: 920
- FIPS code: 55-37600
- GNIS feature ID: 1583440
- Website: townofixonia.wi.gov

Ixonia is a town in Jefferson County, Wisconsin, United States. The population was 5,120 at the time of the 2020 census. The unincorporated communities of Ixonia and Pipersville are located within the town.

== History ==
The town of Union was separated from the town of Watertown on February 12, 1841. Five years later, Union was further divided into two new towns. The first town became known as Concord, and as the residents could not otherwise agree on a name for the second town, the name was chosen by drawing letters at random until a name could be formed from the letters. As a result, "Ixonia" was the name given to the town on January 21, 1846, and still remains the only town with this name in the United States.

== Geography ==
According to the United States Census Bureau, the town has a total area of 36.3 square miles (93.9 km^{2}), of which 35.8 square miles (92.7 km^{2}) is land and 0.50 square miles (1.3 km^{2}), or 1.35%, is water.

== Demographics ==
Historical population
Census	Pop.	Note	%±
1980	2,905		—
1990	2,789		−4.0%
2000	2,902		4.1%
2010	4,375		50.8%
2020	5,120		17.0%

As of the census of 2000, there were 2,902 people, 1,047 households, and 864 families residing in the town. The population density was 80.7 people per square mile (31.2 people/km^{2}). There were 1,082 housing units at an average density of 11.6 persons per square kilometre (30 persons/mi^{2}). The racial makeup of the town was 98.55% White, 0.07% African American, 0.21% Native American, 0.31% Asian, 0.03% Pacific Islander, 0.28% from other races, and 0.55% from two or more races. 0.90% of the population were Hispanic or Latino of any race.

There were 1,047 households, out of which 35.1% had children under the age of 18 living with them, 72.6% were married couples living together, 5.9% have a woman whose husband does not live with her, and 17.4% were non-families. 13.9% of all households were made up of individuals, and 5.0% had someone living alone who was 65 years of age or older. The average household size was 2.77 and the average family size was 3.05.

In the town, the population was spread out, with 25.4% under the age of 18, 7.5% from 18 to 24, 28.4% from 25 to 44, 28.8% from 45 to 64, and 9.8% who were 65 years of age or older. The median age was 38 years. For every 100 females, there were 105.8 males. For every 100 females age 18 and over, there were 106.3 males.

The median income for a household in the town was $58,629, and the median income for a family was $60,184. Males had a median income of $41,190 versus $28,125 for females. The per capita income for the town was $23,979. 1.5% of the population and 1.2% of families were below the poverty line. Out of the total people living in poverty, 2.8% are under the age of 18 and 2.5% are 65 or older.

== Education ==
Ixonia is within the Oconomowoc Area School District. The district includes Ixonia Elementary School and Oconomowoc High School.

== Notable people ==
- Edwin Coe, newspaper editor and politician
- Jenkin Lloyd Jones, Unitarian minister and magazine editor
- Peter Morris, baseball player
