= Oconomowoc Area School District =

School district in Wisconsin, U.S.

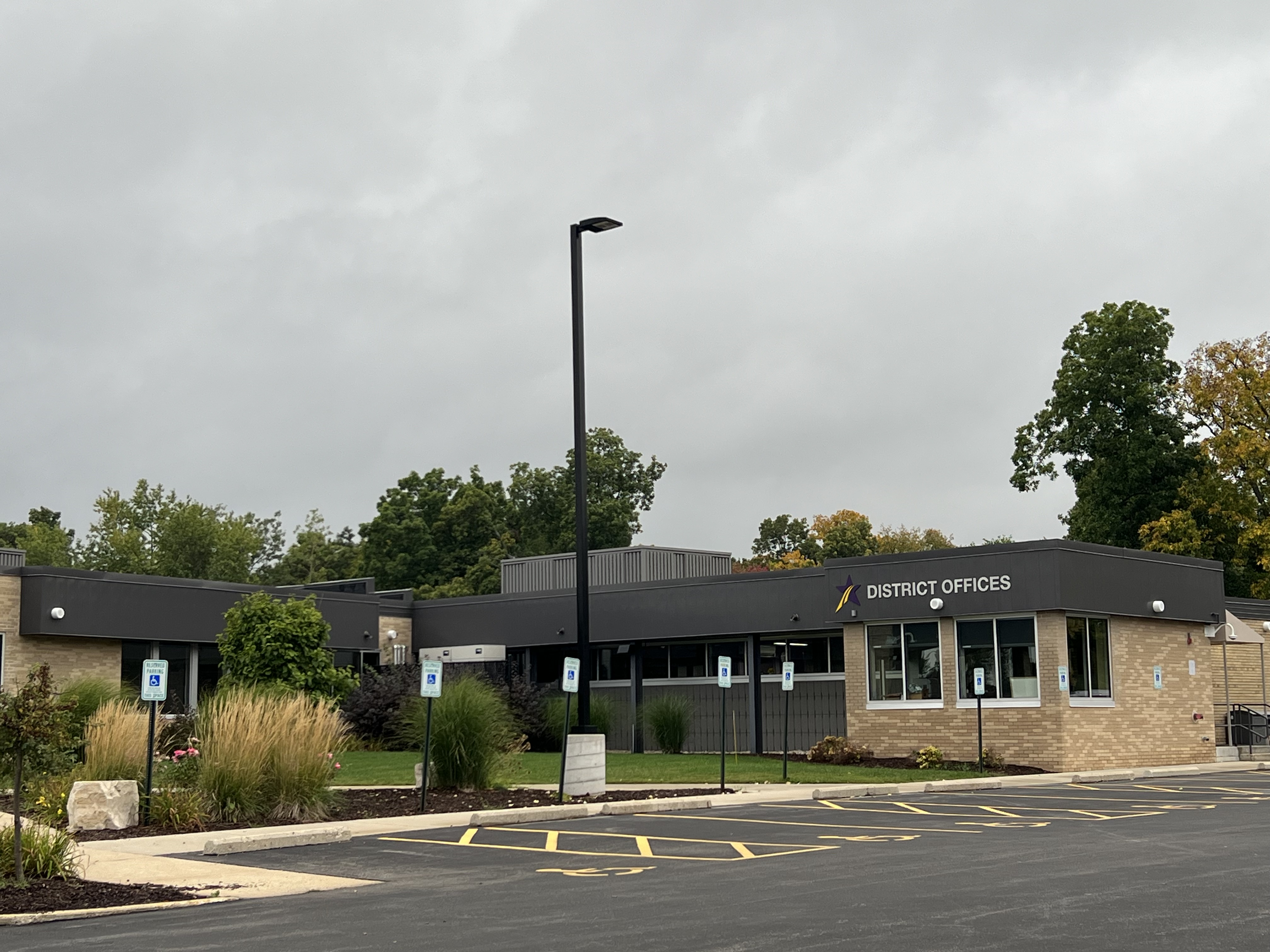

Address
- 915 East Summit Avenue Oconomowoc, Wisconsin, 53066; United States
- Coordinates: 43°5′51.5″N 88°29′1.5″W

District information
- Type: Public
- Grades: PreK–12
- Schools: 8
- NCES District ID: 5510890

Students and staff
- Students: 4,928
- Teachers: 345.44 (on an FTE basis)
- Staff: 222.43
- Student–teacher ratio: 14.27

Other information
- Website: www.oasd.k12.wi.us

Oconomowoc Area School District is a school district headquartered in Oconomowoc, Wisconsin. As of the 2024–2025 school year, the district had 4,928 students.

== History ==
The current (as of 2021) district superintendent is Kristen Taylor, superseding Roger Rindo, who served from July 2013 until 2021. Rindo left to take the superintendent in the Reedsburg School District.

In 2021, three board members resigned, citing the tense atmosphere in regards to COVID-19-related disputes.

In January 2018, Tom Klubertanz, an Oconomowoc High School educator, was named the 2001 Wisconsin Teacher of the Year. Klubertanz resigned from his teaching position at Oconomowoc High School in 2018 amid allegations that were later substantiated, involving a past sexual relationship with a high school student.

In March 2018, principal Joseph Moylan resigned after community outrage regarding a Dr. Martin Luther King Jr. Day event held by the school. Superintendent Roger Rindo was ordered by the school board to no longer discuss privilege. "Schools are a microcosm of their communities. And we had parents in our community who felt like the concept of privilege went a little far, particularly for some of our younger students," Rindo said.

== Service area ==
Within Waukesha County it serves: Oconomowoc, Oconomowoc Lake, the county's portion of Lac La Belle, most of Summit, and most of Okauchee Lake.

Within Jefferson County it serves Ixonia and that county's section of Lac La Belle.

Within Dodge County it serves Ashippun.

== Schools ==
High schools

- Oconomowoc High School

Intermediate schools

- Nature Hill Intermediate School
- Silver Lake Intermediate School

Elementary schools

- Greenland Elementary School
- Ixonia Elementary School
- Meadow View Elementary School
- Park Lawn Elementary School
- Summit Elementary School

Virtual

- OCON Virtual Learning Community
