= Sam Siefkes =

American football coach (born 1991)

Green Bay Packers
- Title: Linebackers coach

Personal information
- Born: August 26, 1991 (age 35); Oconomowoc, Wisconsin, U.S.

Career information
- Position: Cornerback
- High school: Oconomowoc
- College: Wisconsin–La Crosse (2011)

Career history
- Wisconsin–La Crosse (2012–2013) Student assistant; Florida International (2014) Defensive quality control coach; Wisconsin (2015) Graduate assistant; Wisconsin–Platteville (2016–2017) Defensive coordinator; Wofford (2018–2020) Defensive coordinator & linebackers coach; Minnesota Vikings (2021–2022); Defensive quality control coach (2021); Assistant linebackers coach (2022); Arizona Cardinals (2023–2024) Linebackers coach; Virginia Tech (2025) Defensive coordinator; Green Bay Packers (2026–present) Linebackers coach

Sam Siefkes (born August 26, 1991) is an American football coach who is the linebackers coach for the Green Bay Packers of the National Football League (NFL). He previously served as a defensive coordinator at Virginia Tech, a linebackers coach in the NFL for the Arizona Cardinals and Minnesota Vikings and as the defensive coordinator for Wisconsin–Platteville and Wofford.

== Early life ==
Siefkes attended Oconomowoc High School, where he played lacrosse.

== College career ==
Siefkes played college football at Wisconsin–La Crosse in 2011, but injuries ended his playing career.

== Coaching career ==
=== Wisconsin–La Crosse ===
Siefkes got his first career coaching job in 2012 at his alma mater Wisconsin–La Crosse as a student assistant.

=== Air Force ===
In 2013, Siefkes served as a Strength and conditioning intern at Air Force.

=== Florida International ===
In 2014, Siefke served as a volunteer defensive quality control coach under Josh Conklin.

=== Wisconsin ===
In 2015, Siefkes served as a graduate assistant under defensive coordinator Dave Aranda.

=== Wisconsin–Platteville ===
Siefkes was the defensive coordinator for Wisconsin–Platteville in 2016 and 2017. In 2016, the Pioneers made their second playoff appearance in the past four years. In 2017, the Pioneers defense gave up only 18.9 points per game and recorded three shutouts.

=== Wofford ===
Siefkes was the defensive coordinator at Wofford, replacing Shiel Wood, from 2018 to 2020. In 2018, the Terriers defense won the Southern Conference Championship and was ranked first in the conference in total defense, scoring defense, passing defense and rushing defense. In the FCS, they ranked 12th in total defense and 8th in scoring defense. In 2019, the Terriers finished with the No. 20 FCS defense and the top defense in the Southern Conference and won the Southern Conference Championship again. Wofford was ranked first in the conference in total defense and rushing defense.

In 2020, the FCS regular season and postseason were impacted by the COVID-19 pandemic in the United States. Several FCS conferences, including the Southern Conference, moved their scheduled games from the fall of 2020 to the spring of 2021. In Fall 2020, Siefkes prepared the Terrier defensive for their Spring 2021 season, but was hired by the Vikings before the spring season started.

=== Minnesota Vikings ===
On February 9, 2021, the Minnesota Vikings hired Siefkes as a defensive quality control coach. In 2022, he became the assistant linebackers coach.

=== Arizona Cardinals ===
On February 23, 2023, the Arizona Cardinals hired Siefkes as linebackers coach.

=== Virginia Tech ===
On January 27, 2025 Virginia Tech announced that they hired Siefkes as defensive coordinator, who replaced Chris Marve. Under Marve, the Hokies finished No. 57 nationally in total defense in 2024.

=== Green Bay Packers ===
Siefkes' home-state team, the Green Bay Packers, hired him on January 29, 2026 to work under Jonathan Gannon as the team's linebackers coach.

== Personal life ==
Siefkes is married with one daughter. He earned a bachelor's degree in exercise and sports science from at Wisconsin–La Crosse and a master's degree in educational leadership and policy analysis (intercollegiate athletic administration) from the University of Wisconsin-Madison.
