= Alaska Clean Water Initiative =

The Alaska Clean Water Initiative (ACWI) of 2008 was a citizens-initiative ballot measure. In Alaska, such measures become state law, if a majority of voters vote in favor of the measure. The ACWI contained regulatory language limiting the release and distribution of "sulfide mining" effluents and products into the environment. In August 2008, Ballot Measure 4, the "Alaska Clean Water Initiative," was voted down (approximately 57% against and 43% in favor) in the statewide primary election.

== Background ==
The ACWI was created by opponents of possible future development at Pebble mine: the same political forces that led to the Bill to create Jay Hammond State Game Refuge and the Bill for Protection of Salmon Spawning Water. Ballot Measure 4 was written to apply statewide; as the State constitution demands. The measure would have effectively outlawed large-scale metal mining in the Bristol Bay drainage. Supporters of the Measure argued strongly that the Measure would not affect any other mining operation in Alaska. Opponents of the Measure argued that it would have serious, and unnecessary, adverse effects on the mining industry statewide.

Both opponents and proponents of Ballot Measure 4 collectively spent over $10 million on advertising and other efforts. The largest portion of that was provided by the mineral industry to oppose the Ballot Measure; the largest publicly reported personal expenditure, over $800,000, was by Bob Gillam, an investment professional and owner of a private lodge a few dozen miles from the Pebble site, who helps lead opposition to Pebble.

== Procedure ==
In Alaska, an initiative is, "the procedure by which the people instead of the legislature introduce and enact a law. A specified number of voters propose the law they wish to be placed on a ballot to have it voted up or down by their fellow Alaskans. By law, an initiative can not be narrowly targeted, it must have statewide effect. [Ref. AS 15.45.010-245]."

== Legal interpretations ==
Ballot Measure 4 (the Act), if it had passed into law, would have prohibited the State of Alaska from issuing permits to any metallic mining operation with a footprint larger than 640 acres (2.6 km^{2}) that; " releases...a toxic pollutant in a measurable amount that will effect [sic] human health or welfare or any stage of the life cycle of salmon, into, any...water...," and, "stores...overburden, waste rock, or tailings in a way that could result in the release...of compounds that will effect [sic], directly or indirectly, surface or subsurface waters or tributaries thereto used for human consumption, salmon spawning, rearing, migration, or propagation..."

The Act would not have applied to, " operations that have received all required...permits, authorizations, licenses and approvals on or before the effective date of this Act, or to future operations of existing facilities at those sites."

An opinion on the Act issued by the State of Alaska Division of Legal and Research Services stated that the, "Ambiguity, interpretation, and drafting issues...present...interpretive issues. Existing operations might not be able to expand or build new facilities without becoming subject to the initiative's provisions." The illogical misuse of the word, "effect," and the lack of definition of the terms, "facility," and "site," in the Act are presented as examples. On the other hand, an Alaskan Superior Court judge and the Alaska Department of Law interpreted the Act to mean that existing water standards for large scale mining may not dramatically change.

All mining operations must regularly re-apply for mining permits. Opponents of the Act feared that the broad and ambiguous language in the Act would be used as a legal tool against all mining in Alaska. Supporters of the Act accuse mining interests of, "crying that the sky is falling."

The Superior Court noted that the Act was, "ambiguous and open to disparate interpretations." If the Act became law, its meaning and effects would probably have been determined by court rulings. In this case, to determine the proper meaning of the ambiguous Act, the courts would have tried to determine the intents of, and state of mind of the enacters of the law, i.e., the voters of the State of Alaska. The neutral ballot summary ( a one-paragraph summary printed on the ballot) may have been a critically important factor the courts would have considered in interpreting the meaning of Ballot Measure 4 as law.

== Interest groups ==
Supporters of the initiative included some residents of the project area, as well as business interests that benefit from fishing lodges in the area. Opponents of the initiative included some residents of the project area, the Alaska mining community, and the Alaska Federation of Natives.

== History ==
In April 2006 the first iteration of the Clean Water Initiative (Clean Water 1) was submitted to the State of Alaska for approval to begin collecting signatures. The initiative proposed to severely limit the byproducts of mining operations that can be released into streams and rivers and prohibits even the use of any amount of any "toxic agent that may be harmful". It applies to any mining operations larger than 640 acres (2.6 km^{2}), although it has no effect on operations conducted under currently issued mining permits. In June 2006, Alaska Lieutenant Governor Sean Parnell denied the application on grounds that it would act as an illegal appropriation of state lands. By the Alaska State Constitution, only a vote of the Alaska Legislature can appropriate state lands. Initiative backers appealed to the Alaska Superior Court, which in October 2007 ruled that the initiative did not violate the Alaska constitution and approved it to begin collection of signatures. The State of Alaska appealed the Superior Court decision to the Alaska State Supreme Court.

Backers of the Alaska Clean Water Initiative were pleased with the timing of the Superior Court ruling because it enabled them to petition for signatures at the 2007 Alaska Federation of Natives conference. They hoped that Native Corporations from around Alaska would work together to approve the initiative and oppose Pebble Mine. However, at the conference, delegates from around the state overwhelming voted to oppose the initiative on the basis of it hurting not only the Pebble Mine but any other mining operation in the State. They followed up this symbolic act with a lawsuit in November 2007 seeking to stop the certification of the initiative.

In 2007 Anti-Pebble activists circulated petitions for two versions of an "Alaska Clean Water Initiative", applying to any mining operations larger than 640 acres (2.6 km^{2}); with the first version being more restrictive than the second. Both versions collected sufficient signatures of registered Alaska voters and were certified by Alaska state officials for placement on the statewide August 2008 election ballot.

The stricter of the two versions contained language that arguably would effectively make it impossible to permit any new large mine in Alaska, or to issue new permits to allow existing large mines to continue operations, effectively placing a ban on all mining in Alaska. The less-strict version would be little different from existing regulations, but with ambiguous language arguably open to interpretations that would severely restrict or eliminate mining in Alaska.

Proponents of Pebble challenged the constitutionality of both versions; the more-restrictive "Clean Water 1", and the less-restrictive measure, now known as Ballot Measure 4. During the course of months-long legal and regulatory battles over the two initiatives the anti-Pebble activists that initially created and supported both initiatives asked that the first initiative be struck from the ballot, stating that their cause would be best served by concentrating on a single initiative, i.e., Ballot Measure 4.

On June 9, 2008, the Alaska Supreme Court dismissed a pending case concerning Clean Water 1; an action that effectively removed Clean Water 1 from the August ballot. On July 3, 2008, the Alaska Supreme Court issued a decision allowing Clean Water 3/Ballot Measure 4 to remain on the ballot.
