= Newhalen River =

River in Alaska

- Location of the mouth of the Newhalen River in Alaska

Location
- Country: United States
- State: Alaska
- Borough: Lake and Peninsula

Physical characteristics
- Source: Six Mile Lake
  - coordinates: 59°56′56″N 154°51′42″W
  - elevation: 253 ft (77 m)
- Mouth: Iliamna Lake
  - location: 3 miles (5 km) south of Iliamna
  - coordinates: 59°42′48″N 154°53′24″W
  - elevation: 46 ft (14 m)
- Length: 22 mi (35 km)

The Newhalen River (Dena'ina: Nughiltnu) is a 22-mile (35 km) stream in the Lake and Peninsula Borough of the U.S. state of Alaska. Beginning at Six Mile Lake, the Newhalen flows south to enter Iliamna Lake about 3 miles (5 km) south of Iliamna.

Alaska Fishing describes the river as "the major pathway for a mind-boggling migration of sockeye salmon" that ascend the stream in early summer. The main game fish in addition to sockeye are rainbow trout.

It is possible to float parts of the Newhalen in rafts and kayaks. However, waterfalls rated Class V (extremely difficult) on the International Scale of River Difficulty and other sections of whitewater rated Class IV (very difficult) mean that the river "is rarely run in its entirety". The first 8 miles (13 km) below Six Mile Lake are Class I (easy), and there is a take-out point, Upper Landing, at the end of this stretch. More difficult water begins below Upper Landing.

== See also ==
- List of rivers of Alaska
