= Pebble Mine =

Undeveloped copper-gold-molybdenum mineral deposit in Alaska, United States

Pebble mining project
- Location of the Pebble mining project
- Location: Alaska, United States; 59°53′50″N 155°17′43″W
- Discovered: 1988
- Company: Northern Dynasty Minerals
- Website: Pebble project webpage
- Acquired: 2001

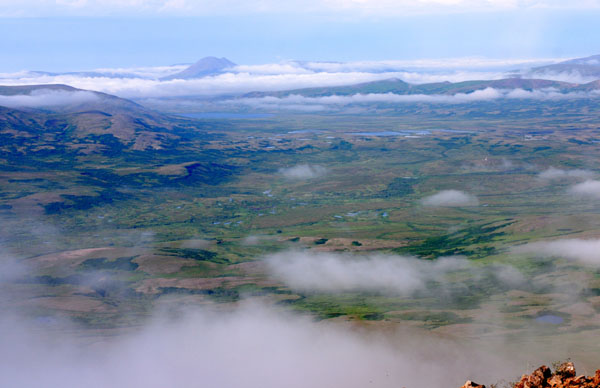
The area of the proposed Pebble Mine, 2007

Pebble Mine is the common name of a proposed copper-gold-molybdenum mining project in the Bristol Bay region of Southwest Alaska, near Lake Iliamna and Lake Clark. It was discovered in 1987, optioned by Northern Dynasty Minerals in 2001, explored in 2002, and drilled from 2002 to 2013 with discovery in 2005. Preparing for the permitting process began and administrative review lasted over 13 years.

As of November 2020, the mine developer, Northern Dynasty Minerals, still sought federal permits from the United States Coast Guard and the Bureau of Safety and Environmental Enforcement. State permitting would then follow, which the developer expected to take up to three years. In November 2020, the U.S. Army Corps of Engineers (USACE) denied a permit for the proposed mine discharge plan.

On September 9, 2021, it was reported that the United States Environmental Protection Agency had "asked a federal court to allow for Clean Water Act protections for parts of the bay." On January 31, 2023, the EPA effectively vetoed the project, using a rarely invoked power to restrict development to protect watersheds.

== Background ==
=== Geography ===
The Pebble prospect is in a remote, wild, and generally uninhabited part of the Bristol Bay watershed in Southwest Alaska. The nearest communities, about 20 miles (32 km) distant, are the villages of Nondalton, Newhalen, and Iliamna. The site is 200 miles (320 km) southwest of Anchorage, Alaska.

Pebble is approximately 15 miles (24 km) north of, and upstream of, Lake Iliamna, and near Lake Clark. The deposit area is characterized by relatively flat land dotted by glacial ponds, interspersed with isolated mountains or ranges of hills rising one or two thousand feet above the flats. Pebble is under a broad flat valley at about 1,000 feet (300 m) above sea level dividing the drainages of Upper Talarik Creek and the Koktuli River.

Upper Talarik Creek flows into Lake Iliamna, which flows through the Kvichak River into Bristol Bay. Waters in the Koktuli River drain into the Mulchatna River, a tributary of the Nushagak River which empties into Bristol Bay at Dillingham. Water from Lake Clark, approximately 20 miles (32 km) east of Pebble, flows down the Newhalen River to Lake Iliamna.

=== Geology ===
==== Regional ====
The Kahiltna terrain is interpreted to represent a sediment trough formed on the landward (Alaska) side of the Wrangellia volcanic arc terrane, prior to collision of Wrangellia with Alaska. The Wrangellia and Kahiltna terrains docked to Alaska in the Cretaceous Period. This part of the Kahiltna terrane is dominated by Late Triassic basalt, andesite and sedimentary rocks overlain by Jurassic-Cretaceous andesitic turbidites. Cretaceous granitic intrusive activity was widespread in the Kahiltna terrane. Tertiary volcanic and sedimentary rocks, and Quaternary glacial deposits, developed over the older rocks.

The Lake Clark fault, or a splay, probably lies within twenty miles (32 km) of the Pebble deposits and possibly much closer. The fault is a major right-lateral strike-slip crustal feature, considered to be a westward expression of the Castle Mountain fault. The actual ground trace of the fault and its splays are unknown in the Pebble area, due to extensive ground cover. A 2007 report indicates that magnitude 7.1 quakes occur on the fault on a 700-year cycle. The Lake Clark fault several hundred miles to the north is sub-parallel to the Denali fault and considered to be of similar nature. A magnitude 7.9 quake struck the Denali fault in 2002. The subduction zone of the Aleutian Trench lies approximately 125 miles (200 km) south of Pebble. This zone was the source of the 1964 Good Friday earthquake of magnitude 9.2. The Augustine Volcano, which lies 25 miles offshore, last erupted in 2006.

==== The ore body ====
A contiguous body of ore is known as Pebble West where mineralization locally extends to the surface and as Pebble East where it is deeply buried. Pebble holds mostly low-grade ore, requiring a large-scale operation to economically recover it.

The Pebble deposit is hosted in porphyritic granodiorite to tonalite of Upper Cretaceous age intruded into deformed sedimentary rocks of the Jurassic to Cretaceous Kahiltna flysch terrane.

The copper ore is a calc-alkali porphyry copper-gold-molybdenum deposit. The ore body extends from the surface to at least 1,700 metres (5,600 ft) depth. In the western part of the orebody, mineralization occurs in a complex of several small granodiorite cupolas, diorite sills, older intrusions, breccias, and sediments. The western part of the deposit is locally exposed at the surface; thin gossans are developed and oxidation reaches 100 feet (30 m) in depth. The orebody extends eastward across a fault contact, at depth. East of the fault mineralization occurs in abundant sills and in the intruded sediments. Farther east, and deeper, the sills coalesce into a deeply buried granodiorite pluton. Mineralization and ore continue into the pluton. The eastern part of the deposit was eroded when it was exposed at the surface millions of years ago. It has since been buried by a thickening-to-the-east wedge of post-mineralization-age Tertiary sedimentary and volcanic sedimentary rocks.

Mineralization at Pebble is aged from 90.4 ±0.6 MYA to 89.5 ±0.3 MYA.

Metallic minerals identified at Pebble include pyrite, chalcopyrite, molybdenite, and bornite, along with minor covellite, chalcocite, digenite and magnetite.

==== Resources ====
In 2008, Pebble was estimated to be the second-largest ore deposit of its type in the world in terms of the value of the contained metal, slightly smaller than Indonesia's Grasberg Mine, which contains more metal in a smaller amount of ore than Pebble.

The last resource estimate for Pebble, as at December 2017, was a measured and indicated resource of 6.46 billion tonnes of ore grading 0.40% copper, 0.34 g/t gold, 1.7 g/t silver and 240 ppm molybdenum. Contained metals in the resource (at 100% recovery) were 56.9 billion pounds of copper, 70.6 million troy ounces of gold, 3.4 billion pounds of molybdenum and 344 million ounces of silver. The estimate used a 0.3% copper equivalent cutoff.

As of August 2020, gross value of the contained metals, 57% was from copper, and 27% from gold and 14% from molybdenum. Co-products including silver, rhenium, and palladium might also be recoverable.

=== Fisheries ===
All five Eastern Pacific salmon species spawn in Bristol Bay's freshwater tributaries. The bay is home to the world's largest commercial sockeye salmon fishery. The Kvichak River has the world's single largest sockeye run. The Kvichak drains from Lake Iliamna, which is downstream of the deposit. Salmon, herring and other fisheries account for nearly 75% of local jobs.

Sport fishing is another important local industry. Many lodges cater for sport fishermen exploiting the salmon and trout populations in the freshwater tributaries. Freshwater species include humpback whitefish (Coregonus pidschianpp), Dolly Varden trout (Salvelinus malma), arctic grayling (Thymallus arcticus) and rainbow trout (Oncorhynchus mykiss).

Seasonal harvesting of salmon and year-round harvesting of freshwater fish is a critical part of life for rural residents, most of whom live downstream of the mine site.

=== Human populations ===
The Pebble site is within Lake and Peninsula Borough, about 1,600 inhabitants as of 2010 United States census, adjacent to the Bristol Bay Borough of about 1000 inhabitants and the Dillingham Census Area, 4,800 inhabitants. Some 7,500 people live largely rural lifestyles within or near the area downstream of the Pebble site. The populations of Lake Clark National Park and other parts of the Bethel Census Area are upstream of the site or in a different watershed.

The populations in the area rely heavily on wild resources for subsistence, harvesting moose, caribou and salmon. Wild resources play an important part in the region's cultural heritage. There are more than 30 Alaskan native tribes in the region that depend on salmon to support their traditional subsistence ways of life, in addition to other inhabitants and tourists in the area.

== History ==
=== Discovery ===
In 1987 Cominco Alaska Exploration (CAE) (which subsequently became Teck Resources) collected mineralized surface samples at the Pebble site from color anomalies visible from aircraft. Geologist Phil St. George was credited with the discovery. He led early exploration efforts, drilling out the first half billion tons of the deposit. The first two exploration holes were drilled in 1988; in 1989 twelve more drill holes, soil sampling, and geophysical surveys indicated that the Pebble West occurrence (originally named Pebble Beach) was part of a large copper porphyry system. CAE continued drilling and other work through 1992, with a second drill campaign in 1997, with the resource doubled from 500M short tons to 1B short tons.

In 2001, Northern Dynasty Minerals, Ltd. optioned the property from Teck Cominco, the successor to CAE's parent company. Northern Dynasty Minerals began exploration in 2002, which continued through 2013. In 2005, Northern Dynasty discovered the Pebble East deposit and acquired 100% ownership of the Pebble mining claims.

=== Project funding ===
In 2008, $140 million was budgeted and approximately 150,000 feet (46,000 m) of additional drilling was completed.

In 2009, $70 million was budgeted, to complete a preliminary feasibility study, or "prefeasibility" study, and to prepare the project for permitting.

In 2010, $73 million was budgeted towards the pre-feasibility report, environmental studies, and various administrative and community-relations work. Applications for development and operations permits were not planned until after 2010.

For 2011, $91 million was budgeted to complete the pre-feasibility study, leading to permit applications in 2012. Environmental and engineering studies including 45,000 feet (14,000 m) of drilling to decide on mine design and a complete environmental baseline.

By 2017, over $150 million had been spent on environmental and social impact assessments.

In 2022, an additional $9.4 million was received from a private asset management company, with the potential to invest up to $47 million total over a two-year period.

== Project particulars ==
=== Project ownership ===
The land is owned by the State of Alaska. Pebble Mines Corp. holds mineral rights for 186 square miles (480 km^{2}) of the area, an area that includes the Pebble deposits, as well as other, less explored, mineral deposits. A sequence of mining companies and partnerships have owned the Alaska mining claims at and around Pebble since the initial claim staking by Cominco in 1987.

The Pebble Limited Partnership was once one of the largest multinational mining corporations made up of South African company Anglo American, along with Northern Dynasty Minerals, a junior mining company headquartered in Canada. After a few investors walked away, Northern Dynasty was the only company left seeking development.

The Pebble Limited Partnership is now 100% owned by The Northern Dynasty Partnership, which is a wholly owned Canadian-based subsidiary of Northern Dynasty Minerals, Limited.

Three of the world's largest mining companies purchased shares of Northern Dynasty or became partners in the Pebble Limited Partnership through obligations to fund exploration and development. All have since divested their interests.

Mitsubishi Corporation sold its 9.1% interest in Northern Dynasty Minerals in 2011.

Anglo American, a South African mining company, struck a deal with Northern Dynasty to earn a 50% interest in a newly created Pebble Limited Partnership, the other 50% belonging to Northern Dynasty; between 2007 and 2013 Anglo American spent over half a billion dollars on the project. In December 2013 Anglo American walked away from the project, losing its 50% interest, which reverted to Northern Dynasty Minerals Limited.

Rio Tinto, through its wholly owned subsidiary Kennecott Utah Copper purchased, for 87 million dollars, a 9.9% ownership of Northern Dynasty Minerals Limited in July 2006, and in 2007 doubled that to 19.8% ownership, for an additional 94 million dollars. On December 23, 2013, Rio Tinto announced it reviewed its $200 million investment in Northern Dynasty Minerals, and considered divesting. On April 7, 2014, Rio Tinto divided its 19% holdings in the project equally between the Bristol Bay Native Corporation, which had opposed the mine, and the Alaska Community Foundation, which had cooperated with Northern Dynasty in managing the Pebble Fund, a financier of grants to organizations in the Bristol Bay area. In April 2014, Rio Tinto gifted its shares, worth only approximately 18 million by then, to two Alaskan charitable foundations.

Northern Dynasty is one of several public mining companies controlled by Hunter Dickinson, a Vancouver-based Canadian mining corporation. All but one of Hunter Dickinson Corporation's board members are also on the Northern Dynasty board. Most of the senior management of Northern Dynasty also hold senior management positions at Hunter Dickinson Corporation.

As reported on February 13, 2019, Kopernik Global Investors beneficially owns 6.17% of Northern Dynasty Minerals, which is an increase of 11% in their ownership stake from their prior reported position reported in February 2018. Based on filings, Kopernik has held a position in NAK since at least as early as 2015, when they owned 19.99%.

=== Economics ===
Pebble is the largest known undeveloped copper ore body in the world, measured by either the amount of contained metal or the amount of ore.

A report released by Northern Dynasty in 2011 predicted profits for mine owners from a large-scale open-pit mine at Pebble, given appropriate assumptions about construction costs ($4.7 billion), scale (200,000 tons per day), lifetime (45 years), metal prices over that lifetime (2011 prices) and the mine design plan.

The study assumed a slurry pipeline would deliver ore concentrate from the mine to a new port on Cook Inlet, and that trucks will haul ore concentrates to Cook Inlet.

The plan expected the mine to return the initial capital investment in 3.2 years, employ over a thousand people for the first 25 years and provide a lifetime 23.2% pretax internal rate of return. The expected pretax cash flow was approximately $2 billion per year for much of the mine life and significantly more during the later years. The report states that 58% of the ore resource will remain at year 45.

=== Permits ===
Northern Dynasty has applied for water rights permits to Upper Talarik Creek and the Koktuli River for use in mining. Altogether, Northern Dynasty has applied for rights to about 35 billion US gallons (130,000,000 m^{3}) of ground and surface water per year, about four times the annual throughput of drinking-quality water at the Anchorage Waste and Wastewater Utility.

In April 2017 Northern Dynasty reported that it had received notice of approval of a Miscellaneous Land Use Permit from the Alaska Department of Natural Resources (DNR) for ongoing activities at Pebble.

=== Studies ===
Site-specific baseline data and scientific studies of potential environmental and social effects have been and are being conducted by the project operators and their consultants. These studies address water quality and other concerns. Among these are:

- quantification of Acid mine drainage – the chemical stability and weathering products of the tailings (waste rock, which would be wet-stacked without dewatering) generated by the mine, as well as of the newly exposed and blast-fractured rocks within the proposed mine.
- seismic risks to the impoundment systems (earthen tailings dams) designed to contain the tailings and intended to control their chemical behavior in perpetuity.
- the effects of road and bridge construction on fish habitat.

Public interest in the project has also resulted in outside, and opposing, interests publishing scientific reviews of available data and comparisons with other projects. These include reports or summaries on the following: acid rock drainage, effects of roads and bridges on fish (roads supporting the Pebble mine could cross 20 known salmon streams), and general water pollution-related concerns.

The United States Environmental Protection Agency (EPA) began conducting a scientific review of the Bristol Bay watershed in 2011 focused on the Nushagak and Kvichak river drainages, in response to petitions from tribes, commercial fishing organizations, and other organizations opposed to Pebble. The agency completed the review in 2014. See Legal challenges.

The U.S. Army Corps of Engineers (USACE) released its final Environmental impact statement (EIS) for the Pebble Mine project in July 2020, concluding that the project would not lead to "long-term changes in the health of the commercial fisheries in Bristol Bay," under normal conditions. After a preliminary draft of this final statement was sent to federal and state agencies, many other scientific and administrative groups critiqued this conclusion. The U.S. Fish and Wildlife Service stated that the EIS did not consider habitat destruction that could lead to destruction of salmon stocks in Bristol Bay. The legal director of Trustees for Alaska, a nonprofit public interest law firm, indicated that the report was "lacking and thoroughly inadequate."

=== Possible mining plan ===
The mine itself would be an open-pit mine a mile square in area and a third of a mile deep. Ponds would be dammed to contain tailing, including some toxic materials. A 165-mile natural gas pipeline would be constructed to provide power for the operation, as well as 80 miles of road and pipeline to transport the mined concentrate to Cook Inlet. Operating the mine would use and impound large amounts of surface water. The roads would carry fuel, industrial chemicals and supplies.

Pebble East would most likely be an underground mine.

Pebble would be similar to existing large copper porphyry mines such as Chuquicamata, Bingham Canyon and Ok Tedi, although the environmental setting and various technical considerations of Pebble distinguish it from these desert and tropical examples. Development and construction would consume years and cost billions of dollars. Required infrastructure includes miles of roads, bridges and power lines with pipelines for fuel and rock slurries.

Design possibilities include: construction of a port on Iniskin Bay of Cook Inlet with a two-lane freight road roughly 104 miles (167 km) long built along the north side of Lake Iliamna between the mine and the new port; trucks hauling ore concentrate to the port; pipelines along the road to carry fuel to the mine and a slurry of metal concentrate to the port. The slurry would be dewatered at the port before being shipped to a smelter, with a pipeline returning the water to the mine. Power to operate the mine would possibly come from a combination of overhead power lines and a submarine cable across Cook Inlet.

Feasibility studies (detailed mine construction and operation plans) were prepared by Pebble Mines Corp. The company expected to apply for permits in 2012 at the earliest.

=== Project timeline ===
2010: Nine Bristol Bay Tribes, commercial fishermen, and sportsmen requested the EPA conduct a Section 404c Environmental Assessment study under the Clean Water Act. EPA describes the study process: "Section 404(c) authorizes EPA to prohibit, restrict, or deny the discharge of dredged or fill material at defined sites in water of the United States (including wetlands) whenever it determines, after notice and opportunity for public hearing, that use of such sites for disposal would have an unacceptable adverse impact on one or more of various resources, including fisheries, wildlife, municipal water supplies, or recreational areas."

2012: EPA issued two drafts of the Environmental Assessment, concluding that the proposal for the Pebble Mine would negatively impact the Bristol Bay salmon. The public strongly agreed, with over 1 million comments supporting the EPA's findings and scientists further verifying the data.

2013: The Alaska DNR signed and adapted a Determination of Reclassification and Plan Amendment to the Bristol Bay Area Plan. This plan increased the amount of land classified Wildlife Habitat and Public Recreation in the region.

The final Bristol Bay Watershed Assessment (BBWA) was released, confirming that the Pebble Mine could not be operated without impacting Bristol Bay and harming salmon. In September 2013 Anglo American, one of the first and major investors in Pebble, withdrew from the project.

2014: Rio Tinto gifted its stake in the project to the Alaska Community Foundation and the Bristol Bay Native Corporation Education Foundation.

2015: EPA released its Proposed Determination suggesting to limit mining in the Bristol Bay region due to the irreversible and detrimental impacts it would have on the local salmon ecosystem. After its release, 89.5% of the country was in support of strong protections for Bristol Bay.

2016: The Inspector General came out in support of the EPA's Watershed Assessment findings, ultimately encouraging limiting mining due to its unavoidable impact on the salmon wildlife in Bristol Bay, affecting both the natural ecosystem and the economic wellbeing of the area.

2017: After a meeting between the EPA administration and the CEO of Northern Dynasty (developers for the Pebble Project), litigations are settled and the EPA agrees to begin proceedings to withdrawal the Proposed Determination act. Developers move forward with a plan for permits. In July, after the EPA proposes to withdrawal Proposed Determination, the Pebble Limited Partnership submits permits to the United States Army Corps of Engineers (USACE), the key agency in charge of reviewing the permit, laid out in a 3–4 timeline. EPA decided to not withdraw the BBWA.

2018: Due to increased input of concerns for the Bristol Bay fishery because of Pebble Project, EPA decides to suspend withdrawal of Proposed Determination. USACE decides to gather more information regarding the impact to area's fish and natural resources.

2019: EPA submits comments to the USACE Environmental Impact Statement saying that the document underestimates the environmental impacts. More than 700,000 comments are posted in opposition to the Pebble Project. Later, the Proposed Determination is revoked, saying the five-year old document does not fully consider all information, including the Pebble Limited Partnership's project plan and the additional information considered during the USACE permit process.

2020: In July, the U.S. Army Corps of Engineers found in a final environmental analysis that the operation of a Pebble Mine "would not be expected to have a measurable effect on fish numbers" in the Bristol Bay watershed. In November the Corps denied the project a permit for its discharge plan, required under the Clean Water Act and the Rivers and Harbors Act. In 2020, while campaigning for the presidency of the US, Joe Biden stated the location was "no place for a mine." In January 2021, Northern Dynasty Minerals submitted an appeal to the U.S. Army Corps of Engineers decision.

2021: On September 9, 2021, it was reported that the EPA, calling the bay an "Alaskan treasure," had "asked a federal court to allow for Clean Water Act protections for parts of the bay. If the court agrees, the agency could move forward with designing long-term protections for the bay." The EPA restoring protections would, according to The Washington Post, essentially block the mine project. Apparently, the EPA had only used authority under "Section 404(c) of the Clean Water Act to block a major project only a dozen other times." Before implemented, the decision awaiting signing off by the U.S. District Court for the District of Alaska, potentially a several month process.

2023: Under the Clean Water Act, the Environmental Protection Agency issued a final determination in January that bans the disposal of mine waste in part of Bristol Bay's watershed.

== Reactions ==
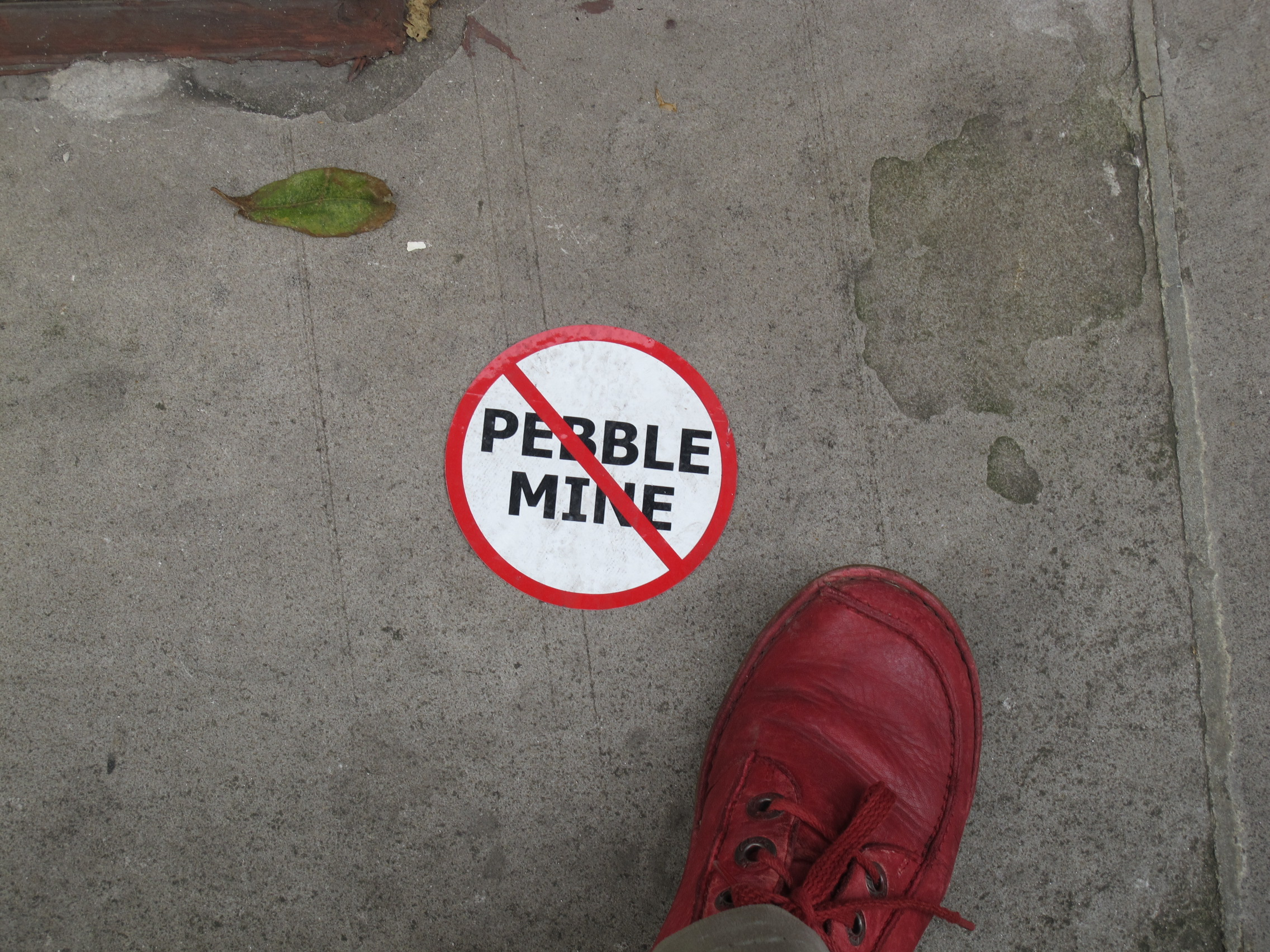
Anti Pebble Mine sticker in London, England

The proposed Pebble mine poses a potential risk to the watershed, salmon and other fisheries. Mining opponents claim that the mine poses a significant and unacceptable risk to downstream fish stocks, and could cause an environmental disaster if built. Mining proponents claim that the mine can be developed and operated without significantly harming Bristol Bay area fish.

A steady stream of electoral, legislative, and legal challenges to possible future Pebble mine development are lodged in Alaska. Some of these assert that even the drilling and other scientific investigations conducted to date have caused significant adverse effects to the land and wildlife near the Pebble site.

Pebble has been a major issue in Alaska politics since the mid-2000s; national environmental and sport-fishing organizations are involved, while national publications cover the issue.

The New York Times reports that, as of 2020, public opinion polls in Alaska indicate more opposition than support for the mine. In the local area near the proposed mine location, anti-mine sentiment is even stronger. In 2006 one poll reported 28% of Alaskans in favor of and 53% opposed to Pebble and another reported 45% of Alaskans in favor and 31% in opposition. A poll of Bristol Bay residents reported 20% in favor and 71% opposed. In a 2008 statewide election 57% of Alaskans voted against a ballot measure that would have outlawed the project and similar projects in Alaska.

Organizations including the Resource Development Council, Alaska Mining Association, and the Alaska Chamber of Commerce support the project. The proposal has strong support among statewide elected officials.

Opposition to the proposal was led by organizations including; the Renewable Resources Coalition (formed in 2005 to oppose the Pebble project), local native groups (such as the Bristol Bay Native Association), commercial and sport fishing organizations (such as the Alaska Independent Fishermen's Marketing Association and the Alaska Wilderness Recreation and Tourism Association), and conservationist groups (such as American Rivers and Trout Unlimited). Deceased Senator Ted Stevens, a strong proponent of other resource extraction projects, in 2007 expressed opposition to the Pebble proposal.

In April 2009, a Native delegation from the Bristol Bay region attended the annual shareholder's meeting of Anglo American, the major mining company behind the Pebble project. The delegation met with Cynthia Carroll, CEO of Anglo American, claiming that the Bristol Bay watershed is no place for an open-pit mine. Multiple UK jewelers pledged not to buy gold from the Pebble mine if it is built, joining several American jewelry retailers and manufacturers who had done the same in 2008.

The Natural Resources Defense Council (NRDC) and other well known groups and figures (such as actor Robert Redford) have opposed the construction of the mine. In an effort to stop or pause the construction of the mine, the NRDC has created a petition that now has more than a million signatures. The environmental justice nonprofit, Earthworks, has more than 100 gold buyers who have agreed to boycott gold from the Pebble Mine. These retailers include Tiffany & Co, Jostens, and Zales, along with others.

After the EPA invoked its power to veto the mine proposal, Alaska politicians expressed various positions. Governor Mike Dunleavy and Attorney General Treg Taylor expressed opposition to the decision and support for the mine. Senator Lisa Murkowski expressed support for the decision but also concern for the precedent it set, and stated that "this must be the only time the EPA ever uses its veto authority under the Clean Water Act in Alaska." Representative Mary Peltola expressed support for the decision to protect Bristol Bay.

=== Arguments against the proposal ===
- Opponents to the mine point out that it is about jobs—current sustainable fishing (world class fishery with long history and that is perpetually sustainable) versus the time-limited mining employment that the mine will generate. (All mines have limited lifespans.)
- The fish in the watershed, and the wildlife that depend on them, are too important to risk in exchange for the mine's economic benefits. (Bristol Bay is the most valuable Sockeye Salmon fishery in the world – employing more than 14,000 people and generating $1.5 billion in annual profit.)
- Accidental discharge of process chemicals and byproducts, heavy metals, and acid mine drainage to the environment are concerns in mine design and operation. Heavy metals are mobilized by acids. Downstream salmon and freshwater fish species are vulnerable to mine-generated pollutants. A threat to the fisheries would amount to a threat to the regional subsistence lifestyle.
- Hard-rock mining already has a notable track record in terms of the permanent and costly legacy of heavy-metal-laden acidic leachate that continuously flows from inactive, depleted old mine sites. According to the EPA, mining has contaminated portions of the headwaters of over 40 percent of watersheds in the western continental U.S., and reclamation of 500,000 abandoned mines in 32 states could cost tens of billions of dollars.
- A recent study of 25 modern large hard-rock metal mines compared water quality outcomes with environmental impact statement (EIS) predictions from the permitting stage. 76 percent (19 mines) of the 25 mines violated water quality standards in releases to either surface or groundwater. In this study "violated water quality standards" does not necessarily mean that the mines failed to abide by their permits. When the 15 mines with high-acid drainage, high-contaminant leaching potential and proximity to ground water are considered separately, this number is 93% (14 mines).
- A report commissioned by opponents criticizes for community, worker safety, public health, and environmental problems at their mining operations in South Africa, Zimbabwe, Ghana, Mali, Ireland, and Nevada and notes the difference between the previous owner's stated corporate goals and their actual corporate performance. (Anglo American gave up on Pebble Project due to environmental concerns; these concerns remain under the subsequent owners of the project.)

==== Economic ====
Due to Alaska's tax structure, oil and gas drilling returns over 20% of resource value to the state and municipalities, fishing returns 1% to 5%, and mining returns approximately 1.5%. However, considering the mine contains over $500 billion in resources, this 1.5% tax amounts to a maximum of $7.5 Billion in tax revenue over the course of the mine's operation or $166 million/year or some four times the commercial tax budget in 2011 ($43 million). The annual revenue potential of the mine is yet unknown, and consequently so is the tax revenue to the State.

=== Arguments for the proposal ===
==== Economic ====
- The mine and supporting activities would provide significant tax revenue to the state. The State of Alaska predicts that direct mining tax revenue, even without Pebble, will be one of the most important sources of non-oil tax revenue (exceeding revenue from fishing).
- The mine will create well-paying jobs in an increasingly poverty-stricken region—a 2007 estimate indicated roughly 2,000 jobs for construction, dropping to 1,000 permanent jobs during the 30- to 60-year expected lifespan of the mine. However, the current expected mine life has been decreased to 20 years following changes to the development plan in 2018. Also, the recent and well-documented trend towards automation of mining means that actual employment figures will be substantially lower than those quoted in 2007. Automation of mines will further increase in the future.
- The mine would provide a domestic resource of raw materials lowering the United States reliance on foreign sources.

==== Environmental ====
- Protection of the environment and fisheries will be ensured by the stringent environmental review and permitting process, including an EIS, that is required before development is allowed.
- Much of the poor environmental track record of mining occurred before current technologies and regulations.
- Northern Dynasty has a "no net loss" policy for fisheries.

=== Secretly taped conversations ===
In September 2020, the media reported that an environmental activist group, the Environmental Investigation Agency (EIA), an international NGO, while posing as potential investors in the mine had secretly taped conversations with Roland Thiessen, chief executive of Northern Dynasty Minerals, and Tom Collier, chief executive of Pebble Limited Partnership. During the conversations Collier and Thiessen detailed their plans to gain the favor of elected politicians from Juneau to Washington, D.C. While the USACE had previously decided that the mine would have "no measurable effect" on fish populations, in August it informed Pebble Limited Partnership that they had to do more to show how they would offset the damage caused by the mining operation. The Washington Post wrote, "...but even as the executives jump through several regulatory hoops, [...] they detailed their plan to manage all the decision-makers."

The Post wrote, "Thiessen described both of the state’s senators, Lisa Murkowski and Dan Sullivan, as politicians who might make noises about the project to appear sensitive to environmental concerns but ultimately won’t stand in their way." Referring to the letter the Corps issued in August, Collier was taped saying both senators had misinterpreted the letter and feeling "embarrassed" were "[now] just sort of sitting over in a corner and being quiet, okay?” Learning of the tapes, Murkowski responded, "Let me be clear: I did not misunderstand the Army Corps’ recent announcement. I am not 'embarrassed' by my statement on it, and I will not be 'quiet in the corner.' I am dead set on a high bar for large-scale resource development in the Bristol Bay watershed. The reality of this situation is the Pebble project has not met that bar and a permit cannot be issued to it." Sullivan also responded saying, "Any suggestion otherwise is either wishful thinking, a blatant mischaracterization, or a desperate attempt to secure funding for a mine that cannot move forward. This incident demonstrates how far Mr. Collier, who has serious credibility problems of his own, is floundering in the face of this project’s overwhelming challenges."

The Post wrote that the tapes also revealed that Thiessen suggested that while the company was seeking a 20-year permit he outlined how it could last another 160 years. "Once you have something like this in production why would you want to stop?" In an interview, Senator Martin Heinrich said the tape raises questions about whether Pebble Mine officials misled Congress, saying, "it really calls into question whether they were lying to Congress or not, which is a crime." In an interview, the executive director of the Environmental Investigation Agency said, "Seeing that the private opinion of that company that their massive plans will be unstoppable once the first artificially sized permit is passed, that is critical information for the public to know before the final decision is made because it clearly may have permanent impacts on an almost priceless resource for Alaska." Following the release of the tapes, Collier put in his resignation.

This controversy impacted the 2020 United States Senate election in Alaska, during which Dan Sullivan was up for re-election. This recording and his campaign contributions from the Pebble Mine corporation has led observers to question the sincerity of his opposition to the project, potentially benefiting his political opponent Al Gross.

== Legal challenges ==
=== EPA action ===
On December 18, 2009, an appeal was filed in Alaska Superior Court contending that a decision in November 2009 by the Alaska DNR commissioner rejecting their challenge of a 2009 exploration permit was inappropriate. The suit contended that DNR failed to give Alaskans adequate notice and opportunity to comment on the permit and that it failed to consider the appeal. Trustees for Alaska is pursuing the suit for Nunamta Aulukestai and two Bristol Bay residents.

In April 2013, EPA issued a draft assessment of the impact of proposed mining plans on the fisheries, wildlife and Alaska native tribes in the region.

In January 2014, EPA released its final assessment. It questioned the future of salmon habitat should the mine be opened, but the agency did not use its authority to stop the mine. Pebble Partnership CEO John Shively severely criticized the EPA assessment, saying it was unscientific and that it sought a predetermined outcome. A few days after the release, Democratic U.S. Senator Mark Begich openly opposed the mine, breaking with the other members of the Alaska congressional delegation, Republican Senator Lisa Murkowski and Republican Representative Don Young.

In July 2014, before the project had submitted its EIS, EPA's Region 10 office proposed restrictions pursuant to section 404(c) of the Clean Water Act, restrictions that would effectively prohibit the project. This was the twelfth time the clause had been employed since the Act's passage in 1972.

On July 18, 2014, in a published statement, Pebble Partnership CEO Tom Collier said that the project would continue its litigation against EPA; noted that the EPA's action was under investigation by the Office of the EPA Inspector General and by the House Committee on Oversight and Government Reform; and also noted that two bills were pending in the US House and Senate seeking to clarify that EPA did not have the authority to preemptively veto or otherwise restrict development projects prior to the onset of federal and state permitting. Collier's statement also said that EPA's proposal was based on outdated mining scenarios that were not part of the project's approach.

In May 2017 the Pebble Partnership and EPA jointly announced they had reached a settlement agreement to end the legal dispute regarding the EPA's Proposed Determination issued under CWA 404(c) in July 2014. The Agreement called for the EPA to withdraw the regulatory action while the Pebble Partnership agreed to terminate outstanding lawsuits brought against the EPA.

In July 2017, the EPA sought comments on a proposal to withdraw its objections to the Pebble Mine based on the 1974 Clean Water Act.

In February 2018, the EPA changed plans to withdraw restrictions on the Pebble Mine on the basis of the Clean Water Act. Instead, Administrator Pruitt offered support of the fishery. The decision is not final and is open to further public comments.

On July 30, 2019, the EPA withdrew its preemptive proposed determination to restrict use of the pebble deposit area as a disposal site.

On January 31, 2023, the EPA blocked development of the mine from going forward. The agency invoked its veto power under section 404(c) of the Clean Water Act, which in the 50-year history of the Clean Water Act, EPA had issued just fourteen times, and none had been overturned. The move was celebrated by Alaska Native and environmental groups, while being decried by Alaska governor Mike Dunleavy, and characterized as "unlawful and unprecedented" in a statement from Pebble's CEO. The veto effectively ends any possibility of the mine going forward as it bans certain mining activities in the area where the project would have been. In July 2023, the state of Alaska sued in the U.S. Supreme Court asking the court to hear its claim for relief from EPA's order. In January 2024, the Supreme Court denied Alaska's request.

=== Nondalton Tribal Council et al. v. State of Alaska DNR ===
Six federally recognized tribes filed Nondalton Tribal Council et al. v. State of Alaska DNR with the Alaska Superior Court (Third Judicial District) on May 5, 2009. The suit challenged the validity of the 2005 Bristol Bay Area Plan, one of many Area Plans created and administered by the State of Alaska that, along with other State and Federal rules, define land status and the appropriate and legal uses of State land within the plan boundaries.

The Bristol Bay Area Plan (BBAP) applies to about 12 million acres (49,000 km^{2}) of state-owned uplands and lands beneath rivers and lakes in the Bristol Bay drainages, including lands at and in the vicinity of the proposed mine. The plan also covers about 7 million acres (28,000 km^{2}) of state-owned tide and submerged lands.

The suit alleged that the 2005 BBAP, which replaced the original 1984 version, drastically altered, without legal justification, the land-use designations, classifications and acreages defined in the 1984 plan; and that the 2005 plan failed to provide adequate protection for subsistence resources, sport hunting and fishing, wildlife habitat and other renewable resources. If successful, the suit will require ADNR to write a new area plan, a many months-long process involving much public input and review of draft versions, although ultimately, approval of an area plan is decided by the Commissioner of Natural Resources, an appointee of the Governor. As of August 7, 2009, DNR had not filed an answer to the complaint.

=== Nunamta Aulukestai et al. v. State of Alaska DNR ===
Nunamta Aulukestai et al. v. State of Alaska DNR, was filed in Alaska Superior Court (Third Judicial District) on July 29, 2009, by Trustees for Alaska on behalf of the Bristol Bay Native organization Nunamta Aulukestai, former Alaska First Lady Bella Hammond, original Alaska Constitutional Convention delegate Victor Fischer and other individuals. The suit seeks "Declaratory and Injunctive Relief," asserting that the Alaska Department of Natural Resources repeatedly violated Section VIII of the Alaska Constitution, which specifically provides that there shall be, "...no disposals or leases of state lands...without prior public notice and other safeguards of the public's interest..."

The plaintiffs are seeking, among other things, an injunction voiding the project's existing permits, including water-use permits. The requested injunction was specific to Pebble permits and would not directly apply to other mining projects. The suit alleges that DNR's "pattern of permitting," is defective because it was not sufficiently rigorous in determining that issuing a permit would best serve public interest, as demonstrated by a lack of documented scientific studies and by lack of public review and input, prior to issuing permits. A Declaration by one of the plaintiffs references the Commentary on Article VIII on State Lands and Natural Resources of December 15, 1955; "As requirements change and many tasks become routine, appropriate modifications can be made in procedures if rigid requirements are not specified in the Constitution itself."

The suit also alleges that significant, and documented, adverse effects on land, water, and wildlife have already occurred as a result of drilling and other exploration activities at Pebble since 1989. In late 2009 the presiding judge rejected a State of Alaska motion to dismiss the case and also denied a motion for a preliminary injunction to stop mining exploration. A Petition for Review on the preliminary injunction decision was filed with the Alaska Supreme Court.

In July 2010, the Alaska Superior Court ruled that Nunamta Aulukestai et al. v. State of Alaska DNR would proceed to a non-jury trial in December 2010. The ruling dismissed one of the six claims in the lawsuit and limited the scope of the upcoming trial to the Pebble permits, rather than to the Alaska mineral exploration permitting system in general.

=== Political actions ===
Two bills designed to outlaw large-scale mining in the Pebble area were introduced in the Alaska state legislature in 2007; both stalled in committee. A third attempted (by ballot measure) piece of legislation was the Alaska Clean Water Initiative, 2008. It was voted down after months of high-profile public debate, heavy advertising, and a series of judgements by the Alaska State Supreme Court. The measure remained an active public issue; in June 2009 the state of Alaska's Alaska Public Offices Commission reported violations of campaign funding laws during the contest.

Then-Governor Sarah Palin was a strong supporter of the project and faced criticism about her opposition to the initiative, the involvement of state government and the intended use of a $7 million federal earmark to facilitate it. Ethics questions were raised about her and her husband Todd's participation.

==== Jay Hammond State Game Refuge ====
A proposal to the Alaska Department of Fish and Game to create a fish refuge in the Koktuli and Talarik watersheds was supported by mine opponents and opposed by Northern Dynasty. The Alaska Board of Fisheries voted to create a panel to study the proposal (which could decide to recommend a refuge to the legislature). Both sides claimed this as a victory. In March 2007 the Board voted to take no action on the proposal due to pending legislation.

In January 2007 Senate Bill 67, introduced by Senator Gary Stevens, of Kodiak, proposed the establishment of a State Fish and Game Refuge covering about 7 million acres (28,000 km^{2}) of state land in the Kvichak and Nushagak drainages (with the refuge to be named after former Alaska Governor Jay Hammond). It proposed that no uses incompatible with: fish and wildlife populations; commercial or subsistence food gathering; or recreation would be allowed in the refuge. The bill sought to close the refuge to new mining claims. Most significantly, the bill would have made illegal the storage or disposal of any quantity of, "industrial waste," thereby making it impossible to develop any industry, including mines, within the refuge. The bill died in the Senate Resources Committee.

==== Salmon spawning waters ====
In February 2007, a bill to stop the project by increasing protections for spawning salmon died in the Human Resources committee.

==== 2008 Alaska Clean Water Initiative ====
In August 2008, Ballot Measure 4, the "Alaska Clean Water Initiative," was voted down (approximately 57% against and 43% in favor) in that year's primary election. The measure was written to apply statewide (which the Constitution of Alaska demands). Supporters of the Measure argued that it would not affect any other mining operation. Opponents argued that it would have had serious, and unnecessary, adverse effects on the mining industry statewide.

==== Property rights ====
Pebble supporters argued that such bills and measures would constitute an illegal taking of property rights (mineral rights granted by the State of Alaska to holders of mining claims on state land).

== See also ==
- Twin Metals mine
