= Pebble Township =

Pebble Township may refer to one of the following places in the United States:

- Pebble Township, Dodge County, Nebraska
- Pebble Township, Pike County, Ohio
