= County of Peebles =

The County of Peebles may refer to:

- A historical name for the present-day Scottish county of Peeblesshire.
- County of Peebles (ship), a four-masted iron-hulled full-rig ship launched in Glasgow, Scotland in July 1875.
