= Eduardo Dolhun =

American physician

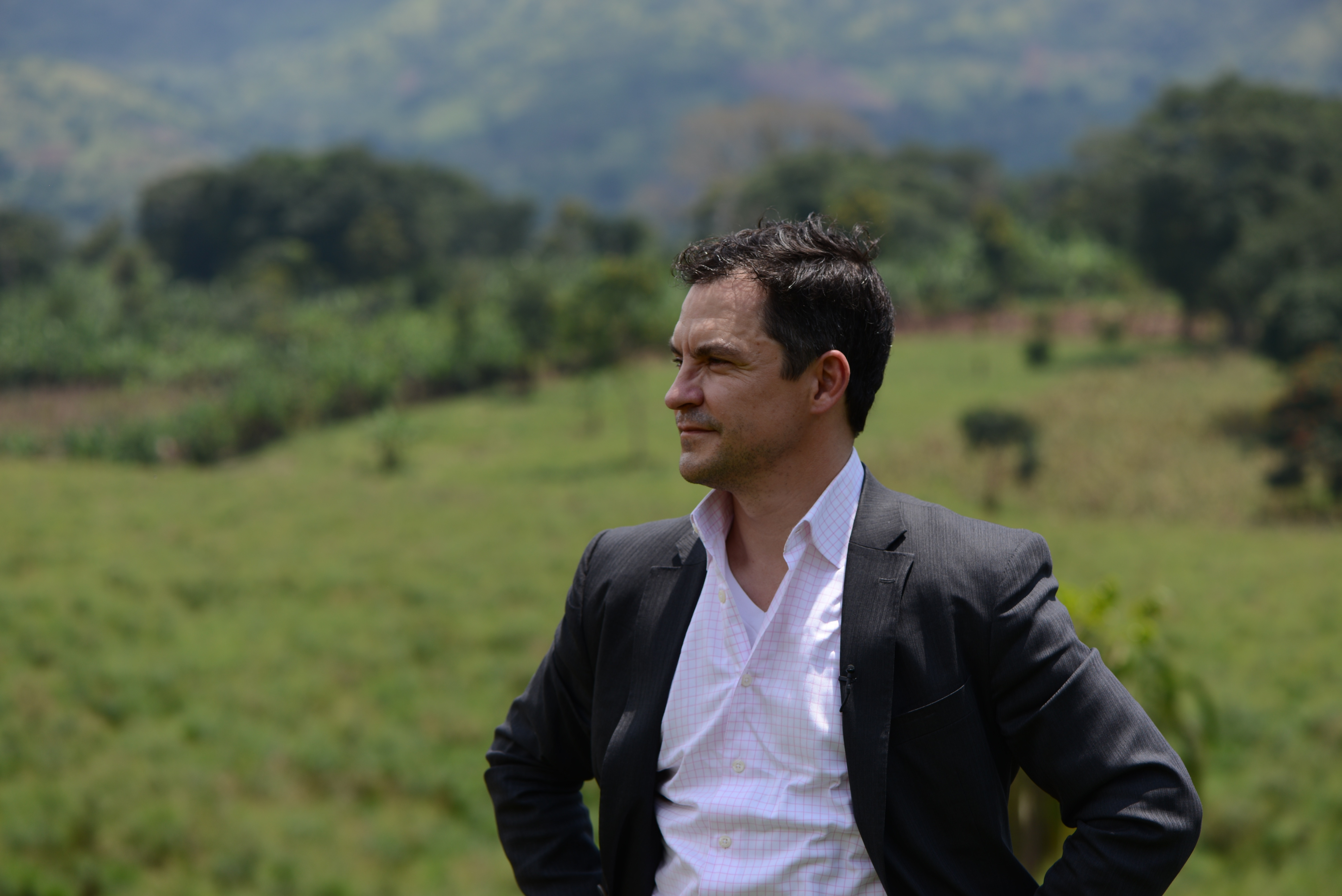
- Education: Marquette University, Mayo Clinic
- Occupations: Physician, founder of DripDrop
- Website: http://dolhunclinic.com/

Eduardo Peña Dolhun is a family physician in San Francisco, California. He is the inventor of DripDrop, an oral rehydration solution. Dr. Dolhun is a staff member at the California Pacific Medical Center and founded the Dolhun Clinic, a Dolhun Clinic Pre-Medical Internship Program, and the non-profit organization named Doctors Outreach Clinics. He is an adjunct professor of Biomedical Sciences, College of Health Sciences at Marquette University and an adjunct professor of Family Medicine at the Keck School of Medicine of USC. Dolhun was the co-director of Ethnicity and Medicine at Stanford University from 2000-2018.

He has been a member of the American Academy of Family Physicians since 1999. He is also a fellow of the Society for Disaster Medicine and Public Health and holds membership in the San Francisco Medical Society.

== Education ==
Dolhun received his bachelor's degree in philosophy and Spanish literature from Marquette University in 1989. He received his medical doctorate from Mayo Medical School in 1996, and completed his family medicine residency at the Mayo Clinic Jacksonville in 1999.

== Career ==
In 1999, Dolhun moved to San Francisco, California after his residency to pursue fellowships in Family Medicine Research and Faculty Development at the UCSF Medical Center and Obstetrics at Stanford University and the Santa Clara County Hospital. In 2000, he became the co-director of Ethnicity and Medicine and Adjunct Assistant Clinical Professor at Stanford University. Dolhun founded the Dolhun Clinic and the Dolhun Clinic Pre-Medical Internship Program in 2005.

In 2008, Dolhun began developing an oral rehydration solution, after traveling to Guatemala and witnessing a cholera outbreak.

Dolhun began manufacturing DripDrop Oral Rehydration Solution in 2010. That year he traveled to Port-au-Prince, Haiti after an earthquake and treated approximately 500 patients and was an original member of what was to become Team Rubicon. Later that year, he traveled to Pakistan with Team Rubicon to treat victims of a massive flood that was chronicled by reporter Kaj Larsen of CNN.

Dolhun traveled to the Philippines in 2013 to assist in the relief effort following Typhoon Haiyan.

In October 2012, Dolhun addressed an audience on the importance of oral rehydration solution in reducing deaths due to dehydration at a TedX event. He received the "Service to the Community" award from Marquette University that year. Dolhun appeared on HuffPost Live to discuss the Ebola epidemic in West Africa in September 2014.

In April 2016, Dolhun traveled to Ecuador to provide oral rehydration therapy to the victims of a magnitude 7.8 earthquake. In June 2016, Dolhun traveled to Greece to provide aid at the Syrian refugee camps located there.

In March 2017, Dolhun treated children near Cape Town, South Africa with DripDrop in the aftermath of the Imizamo Yethu fire.

He is co-founder of AlphaSperm Inc, a male pre-conception supplement company based in California.

== Awards and recognitions ==
- In 1999, Mayo Graduate School of Medicine named Dolhun "Resident Teacher of the Year."
- In 2011, Oconomowoc High School inducted Dolhun into its Alumni Wall of Fame.
- In 2012, Dolhun was awarded the Marquette University Alumni Service to the Community Award.
- In 2014, Dolhun's invention DripDrop ORS earned an Edison Award and was named one of the best new products of the year.
- In 2015, the Society for Disaster Medicine and Public Health recognized Dolhun as their first highlighted member.
- In 2017, Mayo Clinic awarded Dolhun the Mayo Clinic Humanitarian Achievement Award.
- In 2018, the California Academy of Family Physicians recognized Dolhun as part of the "My Family Medicine Story" program.

== Film and photography ==
Dolhun began a professional photography career in 2019. He has photographed Joe Satriani for multiple publications, including Guitar.com and Ultimate Classic Rock. He created the Facing Homelessness Together project, where he photographed and interviewed over a hundred homeless people in San Francisco. Thirty-one of these photographs were on public display across from the SFJazz Center in San Francisco from December 2021 to February 2022.

== Selected publications ==
- Dolhun, Eduardo P., and Andrew W. Antes. "A Case of Cardboard Boxes Likely Facilitating the Biting of a Patient by Trypanosoma cruzi-Infected Triatomine Bugs." The American Journal of Tropical Medicine and Hygiene 95.5 (2016): 1115-1117.
- Dolhun, Eduardo P. "Report from Nepal." Disaster Medicine and Public Health Preparedness Vol. 9 (2015): 226.
- Dolhun, Eduardo P. Aftermath of Typhoon Haiyan: the Imminent Epidemic of Waterborne Illnesses in Leyte, Philippines. Disaster Medicine and Public Health Preparedness. December 2013. Vol. 7, Issue 6.
- Dolhun, Eduardo P.; Munoz, Claudia; Grumbach, Kevin. Cross-Cultural Education in US Medical Schools: Development of an Assessment Tool. Academic Medicine. June 2003.
- Rodnick, Jonathan E.; Dolhun, Eduardo P. International Family Medicine Education: The Netherlands. Continuity: What do Patients Want?. Family Medicine Journal, March 2003. Vol.35, No. 3.
- Pena-Dolhun E; Grumbach K; Vranizan K; Osmond D; Bindman AB. Unlocking Specialists' Attitudes Towards Primary Care Gatekeepers. Journal of Family Practice. May 2001.
- Rodnick, Jonathan E.; Dolhun, Eduardo P. International Family Medicine Education: Portugal. Personal Dissatisfaction in Primary Care. Family Medicine Journal, July–August 2001. Vol.33, No. 7.
- Rodnick, Jonathan E.; Dolhun, Eduardo P. International Family Medicine Education: United Kingdom. What Should Our Priority Areas in Research Be?. Family Medicine Journal, January 2001. Vol.33, No. 1.
- Rodnick, Jonathan E.; Dolhun, Eduardo P. International Family Medicine Education: Ireland. Irish GPs are on the Web. Family Medicine Journal, May 2000. Vol.32, No.5.

== Patents and inventions ==
- U.S. Patent 8,557,301 B2 - Oral Rehydration Composition
- U.S. Patent D646,580 - Bottle
- U.S. Patent D700,314 - Stackable Pellet
