= Pebbles Project =

Humanitarian project in South Africa

Pebbles Project is a humanitarian project located in the Stellenbosch area outside Cape Town in the Western Cape Province in South Africa that supports farm workers in wineries. The main scope for Pebbles is to support children with special educational needs as a consequence of alcohol-related dysfunctions for example like Fetal Alcohol Syndrome. The project aims to support children to increase the chance for them to be well adjusted and have a fruitful education by giving them extra support before they enter regular school.

The project especially targets children of land workers at the wineries in the Stellenbosch wine district. The children are staying daily at so called Crèches where they develop through games and playing in a structured way.

Pebbles Project also trains crèches-workers, teachers and parents in the Pebbles target group. The project also establishes new locations, often in cooperation with the wineries, and renovate already existing locations.
