= Wisconsin's 97th Assembly district =

American legislative district in southeast Wisconsin

Wisconsin's 97th State Assembly district
- 2024 map defined in 2023 Wisc. Act 94; 2022 map defined in Johnson v. Wisconsin Elections Commission; 2011 map was defined in 2011 Wisc. Act 43
Assemblymember
Cindi Duchow; R–Delafield
since January 6, 2025 (1 years)
- Demographics: 93.68% White; 0.51% Black; 2.7% Hispanic; 1.1% Asian; 1.22% Native American; 0.05% Hawaiian/Pacific Islander
- Population (2020) • Voting age: 58,975; 46,726
- Website: Official website
- Notes: Southeast Wisconsin

The 97th Assembly district of Wisconsin is one of 99 districts in the Wisconsin State Assembly. Located in southeastern Wisconsin, the district comprises much of the west half of Waukesha County and parts of eastern Jefferson County. It includes the city of Delafield and the villages of Dousman, Eagle, North Prairie, Oconomowoc Lake, Palmyra, Sullivan, and Wales. The seat is held by Republican Cindi Duchow, since January 2025; Duchow previously represented the 99th district from 2015 to 2025.

The 97th Assembly district is located within Wisconsin's 33rd Senate district, along with the 98th and 99th Assembly districts.

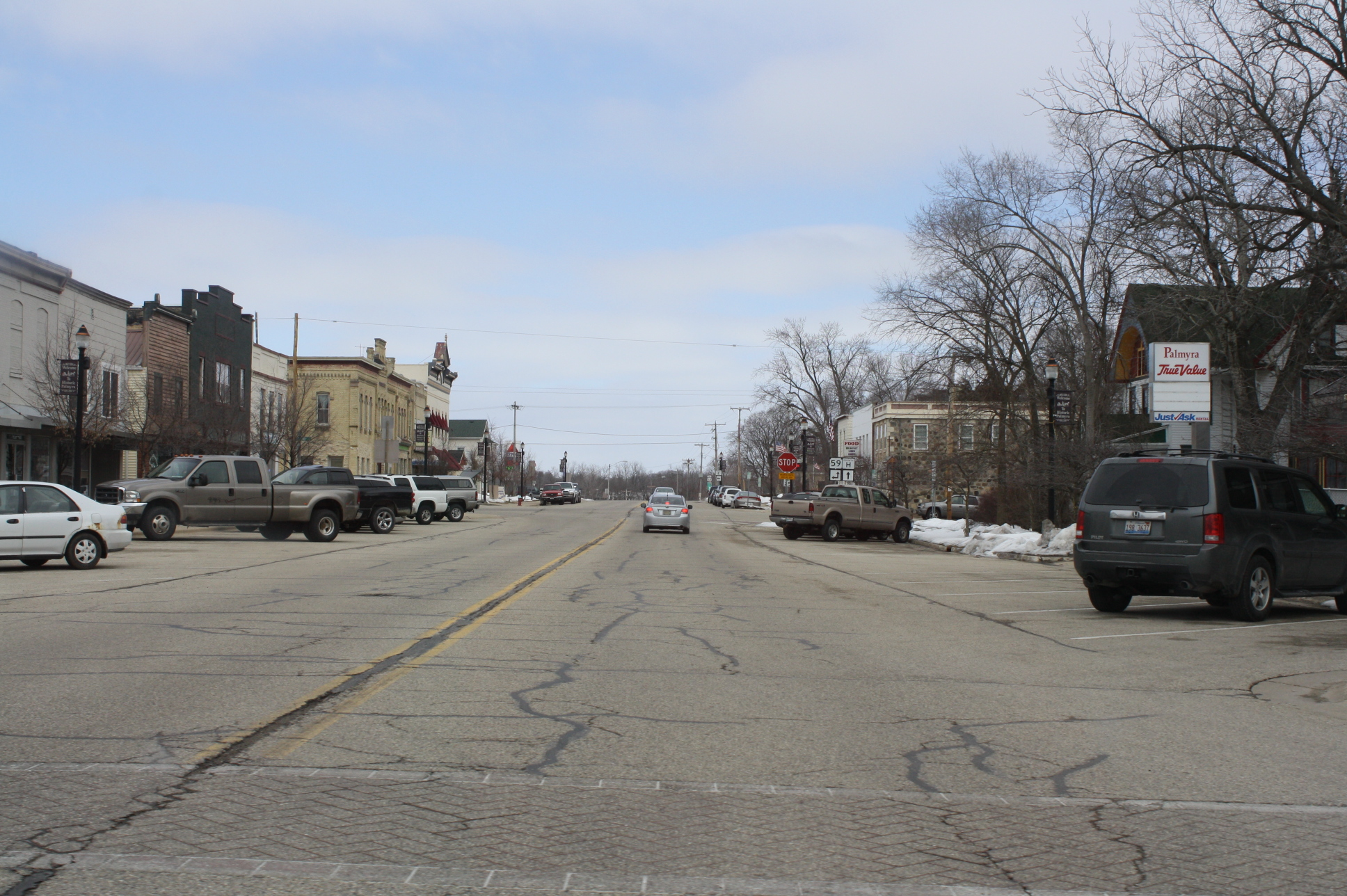
Downtown Palmyra

== List of past representatives ==
List of representatives to the Wisconsin State Assembly from the 97th district
Member	Party	Residence	Counties represented	Term start	Term end	Ref.
District created
John H. Niebler	Rep.	Menomonee Falls	Waukesha	January 1, 1973	January 6, 1975	
Ronald H. Lingren	Dem.	Menomonee Falls	Waukesha	January 6, 1975	January 5, 1981	
Lolita Schneiders	Rep.	Menomonee Falls	Waukesha	January 5, 1981	January 3, 1983	
Joe Wineke	Dem.	Verona	Dane, Green, Rock	January 3, 1983	January 7, 1985	
Lolita Schneiders	Rep.	Menomonee Falls	Milwaukee, Waukesha	January 7, 1985	January 4, 1993	
Peggy Krusick	Dem.	Milwaukee	Milwaukee	January 4, 1993	January 6, 2003	
Ann Nischke	Rep.	Waukesha	Waukesha	January 6, 2003	January 1, 2007	
Bill Kramer	Rep.	Waukesha	Waukesha	January 1, 2007	January 5, 2015	
Scott Allen	Rep.	Waukesha	Waukesha	January 5, 2015	January 6, 2025	
Cindi Duchow	Rep.	Delafield	Jefferson, Waukesha	January 6, 2025	Current	
