= Wisconsin Mr. Basketball =

Honor awarded to high school basketball players

Each year the Wisconsin Mr. Basketball award is given to the person chosen as the best high school boys basketball player in the U.S. state of Wisconsin.

The award has been given since 1982. Winners are chosen by the Wisconsin Basketball Coaches Association at the time of their annual All-State selections. Most of the award winners have gone on to play at the highest levels of college basketball, and some have gone on to play in the National Basketball Association.

Voting is done by a panel of retired members that select the winner after receiving nomination information and reviewing film on each candidate.

Only those in the senior class are eligible to win in Wisconsin.

== Annual award winners ==
Year	Winner	High school	University	NBA Draft	Ref
2026	Zavier Zens	Wisconsin Lutheran	Illinois		
2025	Xzavion Mitchell	Oshkosh North	Iowa State		
2024	Kon Knueppel	Wisconsin Lutheran	Duke	2025 NBA draft: 1st Rnd, 4th overall by the Charlotte Hornets	
2023 (tie)	John Kinziger	De Pere	Illinois State		
2023 (tie)	Milan Momcilovic	Pewaukee	Iowa State, Kentucky		
2022	Seth Trimble	Menomonee Falls	North Carolina		
2021	Brandin Podziemski	St. John's Northwestern Military Academy	Illinois, Santa Clara	2023 NBA draft: 1st Rnd, 19th overall by the Golden State Warriors	
2020	Johnny Davis	La Crosse Central	Wisconsin	2022 NBA draft: 1st Rnd, 10th overall by the Washington Wizards	
2019	Marcus Domask	Waupun	Southern Illinois, Illinois		
2018	Jordan McCabe	Kaukauna	West Virginia		
2017	Kobe King	La Crosse Central	Wisconsin, Nebraska, Valparaiso		
2016 (tie)	Sam Hauser	Stevens Point	Marquette, Virginia		
2016 (tie)	Trevor Anderson	Stevens Point	Green Bay, Wisconsin, Valparaiso		
2015 (tie)	Henry Ellenson	Rice Lake	Marquette	2016 NBA draft: 1st Rnd, 18th overall by the Detroit Pistons	
2015 (tie)	Diamond Stone	Dominican	Maryland	2016 NBA draft: 2nd Rnd, 40th overall by the New Orleans Pelicans	
2014	Kevon Looney	Milwaukee Hamilton	UCLA	2015 NBA draft: 1st Rnd, 30th overall by the Golden State Warriors	
2013	Luke Fischer	Germantown	Indiana, Marquette		
2012	Sam Dekker	Sheboygan Lutheran	Wisconsin	2015 NBA draft: 1st Rnd, 18th overall by the Houston Rockets	
2011	Nimrod Hilliard IV	Madison East	South Dakota, Lamar, North Carolina Central		
2010	T. J. Bray	Catholic Memorial	Princeton		
2009	Jeronne Maymon	Madison Memorial	Marquette, Tennessee		
2008	DeMarcus Phillips	Milwaukee Washington	Iowa State		
2007 (tie)	Keaton Nankivil	Madison Memorial	Wisconsin		
2007 (tie)	Scott Christopherson	La Crosse Aquinas	Marquette, Iowa State		
2006	Andy Polka	Oshkosh West	Loyola		
2005	Wesley Matthews	Madison Memorial	Marquette		
2004	Harris Nelson	Madison Memorial	North Dakota State		
2003	Brian Butch	Appleton West	Wisconsin		
2002	Greg Brown	Milwaukee Vincent	Missouri State		
2001	Devin Harris	Wauwatosa East	Wisconsin	2004 NBA draft: 1st Rnd, 5th overall by the Washington Wizards	
2000	Mike Wilkinson	Wisconsin Heights	Wisconsin		
1999	Marshall Williams	Milwaukee Vincent	North Carolina State		
1998	Jose Winston	Milwaukee Vincent	Colorado, Milwaukee		
1997	Mike Wilks	Milwaukee Rufus King	Rice		
1996	Brad Clark	Markesan	UW-Oshkosh		
1995	Sam Okey	Cassville	Wisconsin, Iowa		
1994	Jim Secretarski	Hartland Arrowhead	Siena		
1993	Anthony Pieper	Wausaukee	Marquette		
1992	Greg Timmerman	Cuba City	Wisconsin, North Dakota		
1991	Calvin Rayford	Milwaukee Washington	Kansas		
1990	Damon Key	Milwaukee Marquette	Marquette		
1989	Chris Jones	Milwaukee Hamilton	Kansas		
1988	Tony Bennett	Green Bay Preble	Green Bay	1992 NBA draft: 2nd Rnd, 35th overall by the Charlotte Hornets	
1987	Mike Johnson	Phillips	Creighton, UW-Eau Claire		
1986	Kurt Portmann	Sheboygan North	Wisconsin		
1985	Dave Mueller	Racine St. Catherine's	Michigan State		
1984	Robert Barnes	Racine Horlick	Wisconsin, UW-Whitewater		
1983	Joe Wolf	Kohler	North Carolina	1987 NBA draft: 1st Rnd, 13th overall by the Los Angeles Clippers	
1982	Rick Olson	Madison La Follette	Wisconsin		

== See also ==
- Wisconsin Miss Basketball Award
