= Prairie Valley High School =

Southeast Valley High School

Location
- 1005 Riddle St; Gowrie, Iowa; United States
- Coordinates: 42.279°N 94.295°W

Information
- Type: Public high school
- School district: Prairie Valley Community School District
- Principal: Kerry Ketchum
- Faculty: 46
- Grades: 9-12
- Campus: Rural
- Colors: Teal and black
- Mascot: Jaguar
- Website: www.southeastvalley.org

Prairie Valley High School was a public high school located in Gowrie, Iowa. It offers a curriculum for students in grades 9–12. It was a part of the Prairie Valley Community School District.

In August 2014 the Prairie Valley district began a whole grade-sharing arrangement with the Southeast Webster-Grand Community School District as a way to deal with smaller enrollments and as a way to save money. The two districts together share middle and high schools. The combined Southeast Valley High School is in the former Prairie Valley building.

== Mission ==
Prairie Valley High School provides students with the opportunity to acquire skills and knowledge to allow them to become productive and responsible citizens.

== Curriculum ==
=== Goals ===
The school has set the following goals:

1. At the end of each academic year, all students will either graduate or continue their education with graduation as their goal.
2. By the school year 2013-2014 all students will be proficient in math, reading and science as measured by ITED testing of grade 11.

=== Courses ===
In addition to standard high school courses, the school offers:

- Agriculture Education
- Art
- Computer Education
- Family and Consumer Science
- Industrial Arts
- Online College Classes

== Extracurricular activities ==
=== Music ===
The school has a Jazz band, Concert band, Marching band, Color Guard, Mixed chorus and Swing choir. The students stage a musical and a spring play each year.

=== Sports ===
The school sponsors interscholastic teams in Boys Basketball, Boys Cross Country, Boys Golf, Boys Track, Cheerleading, Football, Girls Basketball, Girls Cross Country, Girls Golf, Girls Soccer, Girls Track, Softball, Baseball, Sports Ambassadors, Volleyball and Wrestling. They compete in the Iowa-Twin Lakes Conference and the Iowa High School Athletic Association.

=== Jag Café ===
At the school's Jag Café, students in the Sourheast Valley Foods III class are involved in a project where students plan menus, grocery shop, prepare and serve meals.

=== Weightlifting ===
At school, there is weightlifting to help you get better physically and in sports. Most of the time, it is before school, sometimes it is after school.

=== Other activities ===
The school's Dance team, Mock Trial team, and Speech team compete against other schools in organized tournaments.
