= NEHS =

NEHS or Nehs may refer to:

== Schools ==
- National Experimental High School, Hsinchu, Taiwan
- New Egypt High School, New Jersey, United States
- New Era High School, Panchgani, India
- Northeast High School (Philadelphia, Pennsylvania), United States
- Nueva Ecija High School, Cabanatuan City, Nueva Ecija, Philippines

== Other ==
- National Elementary Honor Society, for elementary students in the USA
- Non-exertional heat stroke, from excessive environmental heat
- North End Historical Society, based in Boston, Massachusetts, U.S.
- Victor Nehs (1887–1949), American politician
