= Mory Bamba (American football) =

American football player (born 2000)

No. 38 – New York Jets
- Position: Cornerback
- Roster status: Practice squad

Personal information
- Born: November 21, 2000 (age 25); Menomonee Falls, Wisconsin, U.S.
- Listed height: 6 ft 2 in (1.88 m)
- Listed weight: 193 lb (88 kg)

Career information
- High school: Menomonee Falls (Menomonee Falls, Wisconsin)
- College: Wisconsin–Oshkosh (2019); ASA College (2020–2021); BYU (2022–2025)
- NFL draft: 2026: undrafted

Career history
- New York Jets (2026–present)
- Stats at Pro Football Reference

Mory Bamba (born November 21, 2000) is an American football cornerback for the New York Jets of the National Football League (NFL). He played college football at ASA College and for the BYU Cougars.

== Early life ==
Bamba attended Menomonee Falls High School in Menomonee Falls, Wisconsin, and committed to the Wisconsin–Oshkosh Titans as a hurdler and triple jumper on the track and field team. His parents are from the Ivory Coast.

== College career ==
=== ASA College ===
After one season on the track and field team at Wisconsin–Oshkosh, Bamba transferred to ASA College to play college football. He did not appear in any games in 2020, as the season was canceled due to the COVID-19 pandemic. As a freshman in 2021, Bamba notched 14 tackles, six pass deflections, and an interception. After the conclusion of the season, he entered the NCAA transfer portal.

=== BYU ===
Bamba initially enrolled at Tyler Junior College, but before the 2022 season he graduated and committed to play for the BYU Cougars. During his first two seasons as a Cougar from 2022 to 2023, he played in 12 games with one start, notching seven tackles and one pass deflection. In the 2024 season, Bamba recorded 17 tackles and four pass deflections. During his senior year in 2025, he totaled 23 tackles and four pass deflections.

== Professional career ==
Pre-draft measurables
Height	Weight	Arm length	Hand span	Wingspan	40-yard dash	10-yard split	20-yard split	20-yard shuttle	Vertical jump	Broad jump	Bench press
6 ft 2 in (1.88 m)	193 lb (88 kg)	31 in (0.79 m)	9 3/8 in (0.24 m)	6 ft 3 1/4 in (1.91 m)	4.29 s	1.46 s	2.48 s	4.41 s	36.5 in (0.93 m)	11 ft 1 in (3.38 m)	13 reps
All values from Pro Day

After going unselected in the 2026 NFL draft, Bamba signed with the New York Jets as an undrafted free agent. Bamba was waived by the Jets as a part of final roster cuts on August 30, 2026; he was re-signed to the team's practice squad the following day.
