= Tobin Siebers =

American Disability Studies Theorist

Tobin Siebers (January 29, 1953 – January 29, 2015) was an American professor of literature, art, and design at the University of Michigan, and a key figure in the development of disability studies.

== Early life and education ==
Siebers was born January 29, 1953 in Kaukauna, Wisconsin, the son of Harold Siebers and Marion Jansen Siebers. He was diagnosed with poliomyelitis at the age of two years old and lived with post-polio syndrome for the rest of his life. Siebers graduated from Kaukauna High School in 1971. He earned a bachelor's degree in comparative literature from the University of Wisconsin–Madison in 1975, MA in comparative literature from the State University of New York at Binghamton in 1976, and a PhD in comparative literature from Johns Hopkins University in 1980.

== Career ==
Siebers first wrote about his experience living with polio in his 1998 essay "My Withered Limb." which was nominated for a Pushcart Prize in 1999. His important books include Disability Theory (2008) and Disability Aesthetics (2010). In Disability Theory Siebers writes that "Disability is not a physical or mental defect but a cultural and minority identity." Performance artist and disability activist Petra Kuppers referred to these works as "field defining." He received the James T. Neubacher Award in 2009, from the Council for Disability Concerns.

== Publications ==
- The Ethics of Criticism (1990)
- Cold War Criticism and the Politics of Skepticism (1993)
- Heterotopia: Postmodern Utopia and the Body Politic (1994, editor)
- "My Withered Limb" (1998)
- The Body Aesthetic: From Fine Art to Body Modification (2000, editor)
- "Disability in Theory: From Social Constructionism to the New Realism of the Body" (2001)
- "Disability as Masquerade" (2004)
- Disability Theory (2008)
- Zerbrochene Schönheit (2009)
- Disability Aesthetics (2010)
- "A Sexual Culture for Disabled People" (2012)
- "Disability and the Theory of Complex Embodiment: For Identity Politics in a New Register" (2016)
- "Returning the Social to the Social Model" (2019)

== Death and legacy ==
Siebers died in 2015, at the age of 62. His papers are in the collection of the University of Michigan's Bentley Historical Library. In 2015, the University of Michigan Press and Department of English Language and Literature established The Tobin Siebers Prize for Disability Studies in the Humanities, for best book-length manuscript on a topic of pressing urgency to disability studies in the humanities.
