= Main Street Historic District (Menomonee Falls, Wisconsin) =

Historic district in Wisconsin, United States

- U.S. National Register of Historic Places
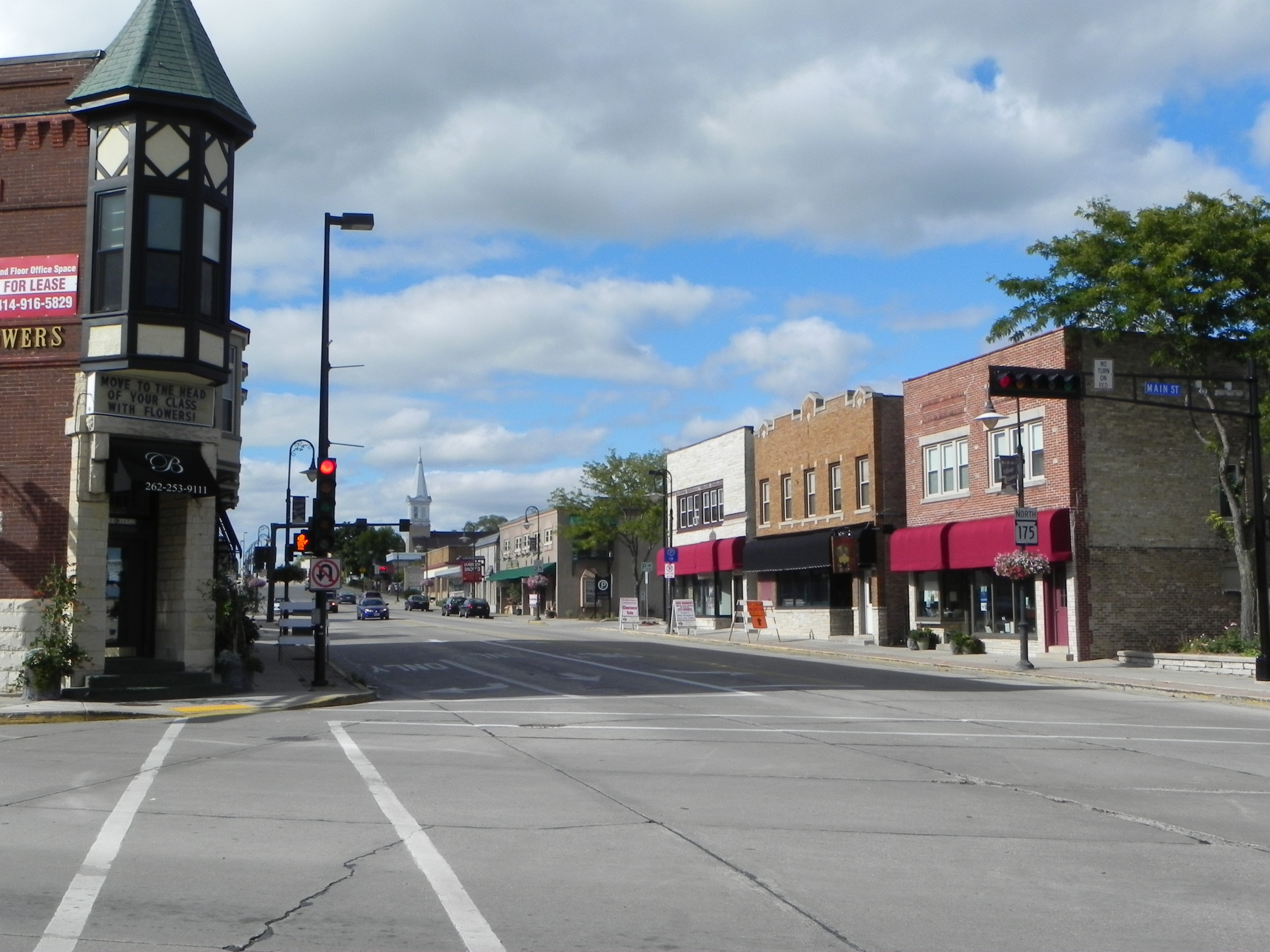
- A portion of the district.
- Location: Main St. and Appleton Ave. (Wisconsin Highway 175), Menomonee Falls, Wisconsin
- Coordinates: 43°10′46″N 88°06′47″W
- Area: 6 acres (2.4 ha)
- MPS: Menomonee Falls MRA
- NRHP reference No.: 88001629
- Added to NRHP: September 21, 1988

The Main Street Historic District is a cluster of historic buildings around the intersection of Main Street and Appleton Avenue in Menomonee Falls, Wisconsin. It was added to the National Register of Historic Places in 1988.

Menomonee Falls was established in 1836 near a series of rapids of the Menomonee River. The river was dammed to power sawmills and wheat mills, and homes and other businesses grew around the mills. The surrounding lands provided timber, limestone to be quarried, and farmlands. The historic district coincides roughly with the old "Four Corners" area of Menomonee Fall, including the industrial area along the river and business district where Main Street meets Appleton Avenue.

Here are some surviving historic buildings in the district, roughly in the order built:

- The Coates and Ostrander Store at N88 W16672 Main Street is a 2-story store built between 1864 and 1869 by Adam Ploss. The building has a wedge-shaped footprint to fit its corner lot, with cream brick walls and a bracketed cornice which drew on Italianate style. The building initially housed a general store and post office owned by Coates and Ostrander. In 1870 it was taken over by John Seabold and John Vollard, then in 1886 by Lorenz Debus, Morris A Schmoyer, and Frederick Nehs, then others. In 1941 it became the Wagner Drugstore, which later became Lohmiller's Drug.
- The Adam Ploss Shop and Residence at N88 W16475 Main Street is a 2-story brick structure built in 1879. It has segmental arched windows, wide eaves with brackets, and a hip roof. Ploss was an immigrant from Bavaria who built cabinets, furniture, and whole buildings. He also co-founded a sash and door factory. Over the years the building also housed milliner, tailor and shoe shops.
- The Enterprise Roller Mill at N88 W16447 Main Street is a 3-story mill beside the Menomonee River, built in 1891. It has walls of limestone quarried from the Harmon Stone Quarries at Lannon. It was also called the Schlafer, Huebner and Shlafer Roller Mill. In 1955 it was converted to offices and non-milling industrial space.
- The Obermann-Weber Block at N82 W16370 Main Street is a 2-story commercial block built in 1892 by the J. Obermann Brewing Co. of Milwaukee to house its saloon. The styling is Romanesque Revival, characterized by the rough stone trim and the round arches. In 1892 and 1894 the building also housed the Stolberg and Mayer Grocery, John Lunn's law office, and a tailor shop, as well as social clubs and events. In 1910 the Jung Brewery had a saloon there. In 1930 John Weber bought the building and renamed it.
- The C.W. Fraser Building at N88 W16723-25 Appleton Avenue (at left in the photo) is a 2-story wedge-shaped building with a corner turret and round-arched windows. It was built in 1891 by businessman Cameron W. Fraser, and it housed the Citizen's State Bank in which he was involved. Also the post office, the Menomonee Falls News, and the Menomonee Falls Telephone Company, of which Fraser was the President. Early on it also housed a drug store and doctors' offices.
- Emma and Hans Mueller's Cafe at N88 W16718 Appleton Avenue is a 2-story brick building designed by Martin Finch White with its brick and geometric decorations influenced by Prairie School style and built in 1921. It housed cafes and restaurants for many years. Early on it also housed offices of Dr. Dormann and Dr. Berndt.
