= Vasean Allette =

Canadian basketball player

LIU Sharks
- Position: Shooting guard
- League: Northeast Conference

Personal information
- Born: April 28, 2004 (age 21)
- Listed height: 6 ft 3 in (1.91 m)
- Listed weight: 175 lb (79 kg)

Career information
- College: Old Dominion (2023–2024); TCU (2024–2025); UTSA (2025–2026); LIU (2026–present)
Medals
Men's basketball
Representing Canada
FIBA Under-18 Americas Championship
Bronze medal – third place	2022 Mexico	Team

Vasean Allette (born April 28, 2004) is a Canadian college basketball player for the LIU Sharks of the Northeast Conference. He previously played for the Old Dominion Monarchs and TCU Horned Frogs.

== College career ==
Allette played for Old Dominion University from 2023 until he was dismissed in 2024. After his dismissal, Allette transferred to Texas Christian University for the 2024–25 season.

== National team career ==
Allette won third place with the Canadian national team at the 2022 FIBA Under-18 Americas Championship.
