= Marcus Domask =

American basketball player (born 2000)

No. 3 – Bosna
- Position: Shooting guard / small forward
- League: ABA League; EuroCup

Personal information
- Born: June 9, 2000 (age 26) Waupun, Wisconsin, U.S.
- Listed height: 6 ft 6 in (1.98 m)
- Listed weight: 215 lb (98 kg)

Career information
- High school: Waupun Area (Waupun, Wisconsin)
- College: Southern Illinois (2019–2023); Illinois (2023–2024)
- NBA draft: 2024: undrafted
- Playing career: 2024–present

Career history
- 2024–2025: Windy City Bulls
- 2025–2026: Fraport Skyliners
- 2026: Oostende
- 2026–present: Bosna

Career highlights
- First-team All-Big Ten – Coaches (2024); Second-team All-Big Ten – Media (2024); 2× First-team Academic All-American (2023, 2024); First-team All-MVC (2023); 2× Second-team All-MVC (2020, 2022); MVC Newcomer of the Year (2020); MVC Freshman of the Year (2020); Wisconsin Mr. Basketball (2019)
- Stats at NBA.com
- Stats at Basketball Reference

Marcus Domask (/dəˈmæsk/ də-MASK; born June 9, 2000) is an American professional basketball player for Bosna of the ABA League and the EuroCup. He played college basketball for the Illinois Fighting Illini and the Southern Illinois Salukis.

== High school career ==
Domask played high school basketball at Waupun Area High School in Waupun, Wisconsin, where he led the team to their first-ever state title as a freshman in 2016, as well as a runner-up state finish as a senior in 2019. By the end of high school, he ranked among the top 20 all-time high school scorers in Wisconsin. He was named Wisconsin Mr. Basketball in 2019.

Domask first committed to play college basketball at Northern Kentucky University in September 2018 as a three-star recruit, before decommitting in April 2019, citing a need to "play smart". He committed to Southern Illinois University Carbondale on May 8, 2019.

== College career ==
=== Southern Illinois (2019–2023) ===
Domask spent the first four years of his college career at Southern Illinois, where he was named Missouri Valley Conference Freshman of the Year, second-team All-MVC his freshman and junior seasons, and first-team All-MVC his senior season. He suffered from injuries during his sophomore year, causing him to only play in 10 games that season. Still, by the end of his SIU career, he became the second SIU player in history to reach 1,600 points, 500 rebounds, and 300 assists in their career, after Darren Brooks, as well as the ninth-highest all-time scorer for SIU.

=== Illinois (2023–2024) ===
After the 2022–23 season, his fourth year playing for SIU, he entered the transfer portal. On April 10, 2023, he announced he would be transferring to the University of Illinois Urbana-Champaign for his fifth and final year of eligibility. Domask was the No. 82 ranked transfer in the portal.

In the 2023–24 season, Domask proved to be a valuable addition to the Illinois team, scoring a career-high 33 points against Florida Atlantic at the Jimmy V Classic on December 5, 2023. He was named Big Ten Player of the Week and AP Player of the Week the week of January 8, 2024, after a 32-point performance against Northwestern and a 26-point outing against Purdue. Illinois head coach Brad Underwood nicknamed him "Luka" due to his crafty shooting abilities.

At the end of the 2023–24 regular season, Domask was named to the coaches' and the Associated Press All-Big Ten first team and the media voting panel's All-Big Ten second team. AP also named Domask the Big Ten Newcomer of the Year.

On March 21, 2024, Domask recorded his first career triple-double with 12 points, 11 rebounds, and 10 assists against Morehead State in the first round of the 2024 NCAA Division I men's basketball tournament. It was the 10th ever triple-double achieved in the NCAA tournament.

After the 2023–24 season ended, Domask sought a medical hardship waiver from the NCAA to play in the 2024–25 season. After determining he had exhausted all possible NCAA eligibility, Domask declared for the 2024 NBA draft on April 25, 2024.

== Professional career ==
=== Windy City Bulls (2024–2025) ===
After going undrafted in the 2024 NBA draft, Domask signed with the Chicago Bulls on July 9, 2024 but was waived on October 2. On October 28, he joined the Windy City Bulls.

=== Fraport Skyliners (2025–2026) ===
On February 8, 2025, he signed with Skyliners Frankfurt of the German Basketball Bundesliga (BBL).

==== Santa Cruz Warriors ====
On 17 October 2025, Domask's NBA G League returning player rights were traded to the Santa Cruz Warriors along with a first-round pick in the 2026 NBA G League draft from the Windy City Bulls. In exchange, the Warriors traded the returning player rights to forward Kevin Knox II.

=== Oostende (2026) ===
On February 16, 2026, Domask signed with Filou Oostende for the remainder of the 2025–26 BNXT League season. He helped the team reach the finals, averaging 8.6 points and 2.7 rebounds in 13 games played.

=== Bosna (2026–present) ===
On August 1, 2026, Domask signed with Bosna BH Telecom of the Bosnian League, ABA League and the EuroCup.

== Career statistics ==
Legend
| GP | Games played | GS | Games started | MPG | Minutes per game |
| FG% | Field goal percentage | 3P% | 3-point field goal percentage | FT% | Free throw percentage |
| RPG | Rebounds per game | APG | Assists per game | SPG | Steals per game |
| BPG | Blocks per game | PPG | Points per game | **Bold** | Career high |

=== College ===
| Year | Team | GP | GS | MPG | FG% | 3P% | FT% | RPG | APG | SPG | BPG | PPG |
|---|---|---|---|---|---|---|---|---|---|---|---|---|
| 2019–20 | Southern Illinois | 32 | 31 | 34.8 | .469 | **.397** | .825 | 5.2 | 2.5 | 0.9 | 0.4 | 13.6 |
| 2020–21 | Southern Illinois | 10 | 10 | 33.8 | **.484** | .304 | .829 | 4.5 | 3.2 | 0.4 | **1.0** | 16.3 |
| 2021–22 | Southern Illinois | 31 | 31 | **35.7** | .436 | .352 | .824 | 5.2 | **3.9** | 0.8 | 0.5 | 15.1 |
| 2022–23 | Southern Illinois | 33 | 33 | 35.4 | .447 | .348 | **.876** | **5.8** | 3.8 | **1.0** | 0.4 | **16.7** |
| 2023–24 | Illinois | **38** | **38** | 34.6 | .453 | .297 | .872 | 5.0 | **3.9** | 0.4 | 0.3 | 15.9 |
| Career | | 144 | 143 | 35.0 | .453 | .345 | .851 | 5.2 | 3.5 | 0.7 | 0.5 | 15.4 |

== Personal life ==
Domask grew up in Waupun, Wisconsin, with his father being a basketball coach and three of his siblings also playing basketball. He earned a bachelor's degree in sport administration at Southern Illinois, where he graduated with a near-perfect 3.99 GPA and was named to the 2023 Academic All-America First Team. He is currently enrolled in a master’s program in recreation, sport, and tourism at Illinois.
