= Kurt Portmann =

American basketball player (born 1967)

Personal information
- Born: December 9, 1967 (age 58)
- Listed height: 6 ft 11 in (2.11 m)

Career information
- High school: Sheboygan North (Sheboygan, Wisconsin)
- College: Wisconsin (1986–1990)
- NBA draft: 1990: undrafted
- Position: Center

Career highlights
- 2× CBA All-Defensive Team (1992, 1996); Wisconsin Mr. Basketball (1986)

Kurt Arthur Portmann (born December 9, 1967) is an American former professional basketball player.

== Career ==
Portmann, a 6'11'' center, graduated from Sheboygan North High School in Sheboygan, Wisconsin in 1986. He averaged 15 points, 9.2 rebounds and 5 blocks as a senior and was named Wisconsin's Mr. Basketball by the Wisconsin Basketball Coaches Association in 1986. He was recruited by schools including Marquette, Michigan, Missouri and Wisconsin. Portmann chose the University of Wisconsin. As a member of the Wisconsin Badgers men's basketball team, he made 118 appearances (30 starts) between 1986 and 1990, averaging 4.3 points, 3.5 rebounds and .9 blocks per contest. Portmann ranked second all-time in blocked shots (102) behind Brad Sellers, when he graduated in 1990.

In the professional ranks, Portmann played for the CBA's Wichita Falls Texans from 1990 to 1993. His CBA career high were 11.2 points per game in the 1991–92 season. He played for Racing Basket Mechelen in Belgium in 1993–94, for KK Split in Croatia in 1994-95 and for SV Oberelchingen in Germany in 1995–96. Portmann represented the Quad City Thunder in 1995-96 and 1996–97. He made the CBA All-Defensive Team in 1991-92 and 1995–96. Portmann also earned All-Star honors while competing in the CBA.

He played for the Toshiba Red Thunders in Japan. In 1999-2000, Portmann was a member of the SeaHorses Mikawa in the same country.

Portmann started working as Executive Associate Athletic Director for Compliance at Midwestern State University. His son Max played college basketball at the University of Maryland, Baltimore County.
