= Jordan McCabe =

American basketball player

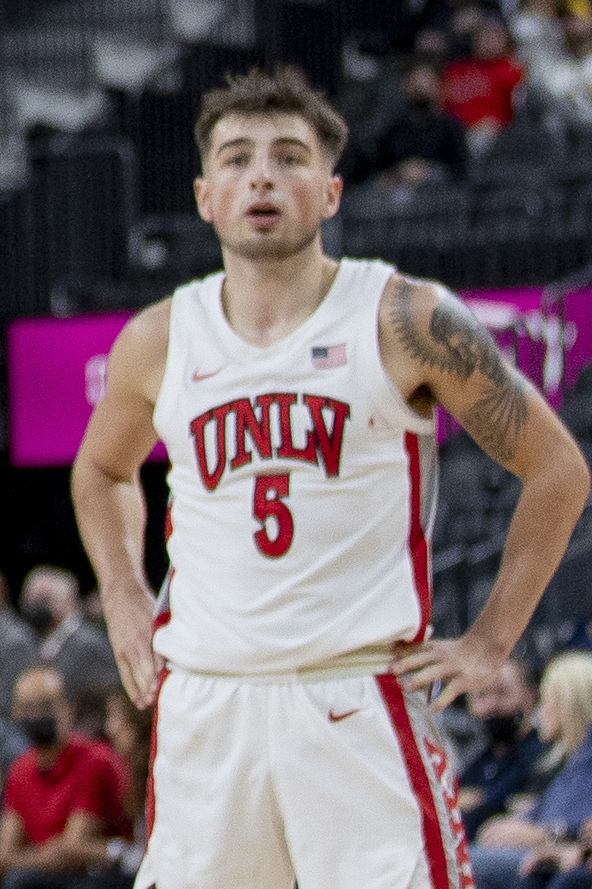
- McCabe with UNLV in 2021

Grand Canyon Antelopes
- Title: Assistant coach
- League: Mountain West Conference

Personal information
- Born: September 3, 1998 (age 28) Kaukauna, Wisconsin, U.S.
- Listed height: 6 ft 0 in (1.83 m)
- Listed weight: 190 lb (86 kg)

Career information
- High school: Kaukauna (Kaukauna, Wisconsin)
- College: West Virginia (2018–2021); UNLV (2021–2023)
- Position: Point guard
- Number: 5
- Coaching career: 2023–present

Career history

Coaching
- 2023–2024: West Virginia (assistant)
- 2024–2025: Green Bay (assistant)
- 2025–present: Grand Canyon (assistant)

Career highlights
- As player: Wisconsin Mr. Basketball (2018)

Jordan Ray McCabe (born September 3, 1998) is an American assistant basketball coach for the Grand Canyon Antelopes. He is also a former college basketball player at West Virginia and UNLV.

== Early life ==
At age 12, while attending Beaver Lake Middle School in Sammamish, Washington, he drew national attention for his dribbling ability. In December 2010, he featured in a KOMO-TV segment. In the following months, McCabe appeared on The Ellen DeGeneres Show to put on a dribbling exhibition and was showcased in an ABC News segment. He performed at halftime in collegiate and professional basketball games and at the NBA All-Star Game. In June 2011, McCabe was drafted by the Harlem Globetrotters, who intended to sign him after his graduation from college. He was held back in seventh grade as a "family decision".

== High school career ==
McCabe was a four-year varsity basketball player for Kaukauna High School in Kaukauna, Wisconsin under head coach Michael Schalow. As a sophomore, he was named Fox Valley Association (FVA) Player of the Year and led his team to the Wisconsin Interscholastic Athletic Association (WIAA) Division 2 state championship, scoring 24 points in the title game. Before his junior year, McCabe committed to play college basketball for West Virginia over offers from DePaul, Minnesota and Missouri, among others. In his junior season, he averaged 25.1 points per game. As a senior, McCabe averaged 26.7 points and 7.8 assists per game, sharing FVA co-Player of the Year honors with Tyrese Haliburton while being named Wisconsin Mr. Basketball. He led Kaukauna to another WIAA Division 2 state championship. In the title game, McCabe led all scorers with 32 points, recorded his team's final eight points, and made the game-winning shot with 3.5 seconds left.

=== Recruiting ===
Considered a three-to-four-star recruit by major recruiting services, he committed to playing college basketball for West Virginia on August 16, 2016.

College recruiting
Name	Hometown	School	Height	Weight	Commit date
Jordan McCabe; PG	Kaukauna, Wisconsin	Kaukauna High School	5 ft 10 in (1.78 m)	155 lb (70 kg)	Aug 16, 2016
Jordan McCabe; PG	Recruit ratings: Rivals: 247Sports: ESPN: (84)				
Overall recruit ranking: Rivals: 147 247Sports: 174 ESPN: 86
Note: In many cases, Scout, Rivals, 247Sports, On3, and ESPN may conflict in their listings of height and weight.; In these cases, the average was taken. ESPN grades are on a 100-point scale.; Sources: "West Virginia 2018 Basketball Commitments". Rivals.; "2018 West Virginia Mountaineers Recruiting Class". ESPN.; "2018 Team Ranking". Rivals.

== College career ==
=== West Virginia ===
McCabe made his debut for West Virginia in a November 9, 2018, loss to Buffalo. On February 26, 2019, he recorded 25 points, 11 assists and six steals, all of which were freshman season-highs, in 50 minutes during a 104–96 triple overtime win over TCU. McCabe became the first college player to record at least those numbers in one game since Ohio's D. J. Cooper in 2010. On March 4, he was named Big 12 Conference Newcomer of the Week. As a freshman, McCabe averaged 5.8 points and 2.5 assists per game, shooting 32.2 percent from the field, and led his team with 88 total assists. He earned Big 12 Academic All-Rookie Team honors.

McCabe continued to struggle shooting the ball in his sophomore season. He scored a season-high 10 points on two occasions and averaged 3.1 points in 13.5 minutes per game, despite starting in 29 of his 31 appearances as a sophomore. As a junior, McCabe averaged 2.2 points and 1.4 assists per game.

=== UNLV ===
For his senior season, McCabe transferred to UNLV. He graduated from West Virginia, allowing him to be immediately eligible to play for the Rebels. He started all 31 games he appeared in, averaging a career-high 6.4 points and 4.8 assists in 30.3 minutes per game.

McCabe opted in to his fifth year of eligibility, returning to UNLV for the 2022–23 season. He started just 3 games and averaged 5.5 points in 18.6 minutes per game.

== Coaching career ==
On July 6, 2023, McCabe returned to West Virginia as an assistant coach for the 2023–24 season.

On April 29, 2024, McCabe returned to the state of Wisconsin as an assistant coach for Green Bay under Sundance Wicks, who left weeks later to become the head coach at Wyoming. McCabe was retained by new head coach Doug Gottlieb.

After one season with the Phoenix, McCabe was announced as an assistant coach at Grand Canyon under Bryce Drew on June 14, 2025.

== Career statistics ==
Legend
GP	Games played	GS	Games started	MPG	Minutes per game
FG%	Field goal percentage	3P%	3-point field goal percentage	FT%	Free throw percentage
RPG	Rebounds per game	APG	Assists per game	SPG	Steals per game
BPG	Blocks per game	PPG	Points per game	**Bold**	Career high

=== College ===
Year	Team	GP	GS	MPG	FG%	3P%	FT%	RPG	APG	SPG	BPG	PPG
2018–19	West Virginia	**35**	15	18.5	.322	.338	.743	1.6	2.5	0.9	0.0	5.8
2019–20	West Virginia	31	29	13.5	.311	.209	.760	1.0	1.6	0.5	0.0	3.1
2020–21	West Virginia	28	5	11.0	.310	.212	**.818**	1.1	1.4	0.5	0.0	2.2
2021–22	UNLV	31	**31**	**30.3**	.335	.317	.735	**1.7**	**4.8**	**1.1**	**0.1**	**6.4**
2022–23	UNLV	29	3	18.6	**.368**	**.393**	.750	1.4	1.8	0.9	**0.1**	5.5
Career		154	83	18.5	.332	.314	.757	1.4	2.5	0.8	0.0	4.7
