= Joe Wineke =

American Democratic politician

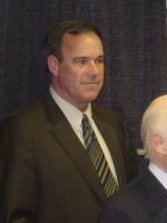
- Wineke in 2006

Chair of the Democratic Party of Wisconsin
- In office June 11, 2005 – June 13, 2009
- Preceded by: Linda Honold
- Succeeded by: Mike Tate

Member of the Wisconsin Senate from the 27th district
- In office April 1993 – January 4, 1999
- Preceded by: Russ Feingold
- Succeeded by: Jon Erpenbach

Member of the Wisconsin State Assembly
- In office January 7, 1985 – April 1993
- Preceded by: David Prosser Jr.
- Succeeded by: Richard A. Skindrud
- Constituency: 79th district
- In office January 3, 1983 – January 7, 1985
- Preceded by: Lolita Schneiders
- Succeeded by: Lolita Schneiders
- Constituency: 97th district

Personal details
- Born: January 5, 1957 (age 69) Madison, Wisconsin, U.S.
- Party: Democratic
- Spouse: Debora
- Children: 4
- Education: University of Wisconsin-Madison
- Profession: Legislator, Realtor

Joseph S. Wineke (born January 5, 1957) is an American politician. He was chairman of the Democratic Party of Wisconsin from 2005 through 2009. During his term as chair, he saw the Democrats gain full control of Wisconsin's executive and legislative branches for the first time since 1986. Before becoming party chair, he served ten years in the Wisconsin State Assembly and six years in the Wisconsin State Senate, representing suburban areas of Dane, Green, and Rock counties.

== Early life and career ==
Wineke graduated from Verona Area High School in 1975. He graduated with a B.A. in political science from the University of Wisconsin-Madison in 1980. He served on the Verona City Council from 1980 to 1983. He was elected to the Wisconsin State Assembly and served from 1983 to 1993, when he was elected to the Wisconsin State Senate in the April 1993 special election. Wineke was reelected in 1994.

== Political career ==
In 1998, Wineke ran for the open seat being vacated by United States Representative Scott Klug in the U.S. House of Representatives. He was defeated in the Democratic primary, receiving 27 percent of the vote. Tammy Baldwin won both the primary and general election.

Wineke was elected the chairperson of the Democratic Party of Wisconsin in 2005. He served the limit of two terms, and was succeeded by Mike Tate, who was elected in June 2009. He went on to serve as the Executive Director of the Construction Labor-Management Council of Greater Wisconsin Inc. The Council was created in 1990 as a joint effort between building trades unions and contractors to promote a better construction industry. Wineke currently serves as the Administrator of the State of Wisconsin Division of Compensation and Labor Relations.

== Personal life ==
Wineke was born in Madison and raised in Verona, Wisconsin. He and his wife, Debora, have three children, Scott, Brian, and Jessica.

Party political offices
Preceded by Linda Honold	Chair of the Democratic Party of Wisconsin; June 11, 2005 – June 13, 2009	Succeeded by Mike Tate
Wisconsin State Assembly
Preceded by Lolita Schneiders	Member of the Wisconsin State Assembly from the 97th district January 4, 1983 – January 7, 1985	Succeeded by Lolita Schneiders
Preceded by David Prosser Jr.	Member of the Wisconsin State Assembly from the 79th district January 7, 1985 – April 1993	Succeeded by Richard A. Skindrud
Wisconsin Senate
Preceded by Russ Feingold	Member of the Wisconsin Senate from the 27th district April 1993 – January 4, 1999	Succeeded by Jon Erpenbach
