= Joel Whitburn =

American author and music historian (1939–2022)

- Born: Joel Carver Whitburn; November 29, 1939; Wauwatosa, Wisconsin, U.S.
- Died: June 14, 2022 (aged 82); Menomonee Falls, Wisconsin, U.S.
- Occupations: Author; music historian
- Known for: Researching record chart history
- Spouse: Frances Mudgett
- Children: 1

Joel Carver Whitburn (November 29, 1939 – June 14, 2022) was an American author and music historian, responsible for setting up the Record Research, Inc. series of books on record chart placings.

== Early life ==
Joel Carver Whitburn was born in Wauwatosa, Wisconsin, on November 29, 1939. He started collecting records in his teens, first subscribed to Billboard in 1953, and when the Hot 100 was introduced in 1958 started recording the chart placings of records on index cards. After graduating from Menomonee Falls High School in 1957, he attended Elmhurst College and the University of Wisconsin–Milwaukee, but did not receive a degree from either institution.

== Career ==
Whitburn worked on record distribution for RCA in the mid-1960s, using his chart statistics to inform radio stations, before founding his own company, Record Research, Inc., in Menomonee Falls, Wisconsin, in 1970. He put together a team of researchers to examine in detail all of Billboard's music and video charts, and set up a licensing arrangement with Billboard.

Since then, Record Research has published reference books based on data from the various popular music charts and to date has published over 200 books, 50 of which are in the Record Research catalog. His research extends from 1890 to the present and covers many genres. Featuring each recording's peak position, date charted, weeks charted, label and information, and trivia on recordings and artists, Whitburn's books are used extensively by the entertainment industry (especially radio DJs) and music fans worldwide.

His flagship publication was Top Pop Singles, which covers the history of Billboard's popular singles charts, primarily the Billboard Hot 100. The most recent edition, Top Pop Singles 1955–2018, was released in June 2019. Whitburn was also the author of the series Top 40 Hits, published by Billboard Books. The ninth edition, covering the years 1955 to 2009, was published in 2012.

== Personal life ==
Whitburn was an avid collector of phonograph records, with extensive collections in his underground vaults. His collection included a copy of nearly every 78-rpm record, 45-rpm single, LP, and compact disc to reach the Billboard charts. In 2013, his collection was estimated to contain over 200,000 singles.

Whitburn was married to Frances (née Mudgett), and they had a daughter. He died at his home in Menomonee Falls, Wisconsin, at the age of 82 on June 14, 2022. His wife, Frances, died five months later.
