= Menomonee Falls School District =

School district in Menomonee Falls, Wisconsin

Address
- W9363E28 Pilgrim Rd Menomonee Falls, WI, 53051-3140; United States

District information
- Motto: "Engage. Learn. Improve.”
- Grades: PK–12
- Established: 1882
- Superintendent: David Muniz
- Schools: 6
- NCES District ID: 5509060
- District ID: WI-3437

Students and staff
- Enrollment: 3,876 (2024-2025)
- Teachers: 266.52 (2024-2025)
- Staff: 182.21 (2024-2025)
- Student–teacher ratio: 14.54:1

Other information
- Website: www.fallsschools.org

The Menomonee Falls School District is located in Menomonee Falls, Wisconsin. The school district includes four elementary schools, one middle school, and one high school. It employs 658 people, and serves about 4,000 students.

The district covers most of Menomonee Falls, a section of Lannon, and a small section of Milwaukee in Waukesha County.

== History ==
In 2022 activists aligned with the Republican Party proposed changing the system of electing school board members from an at large system to one where each existing board member would receive a number and particular opponents compete with a particular existing board member based on a number; the new system would not be aligned with geographic areas.

== Schools ==
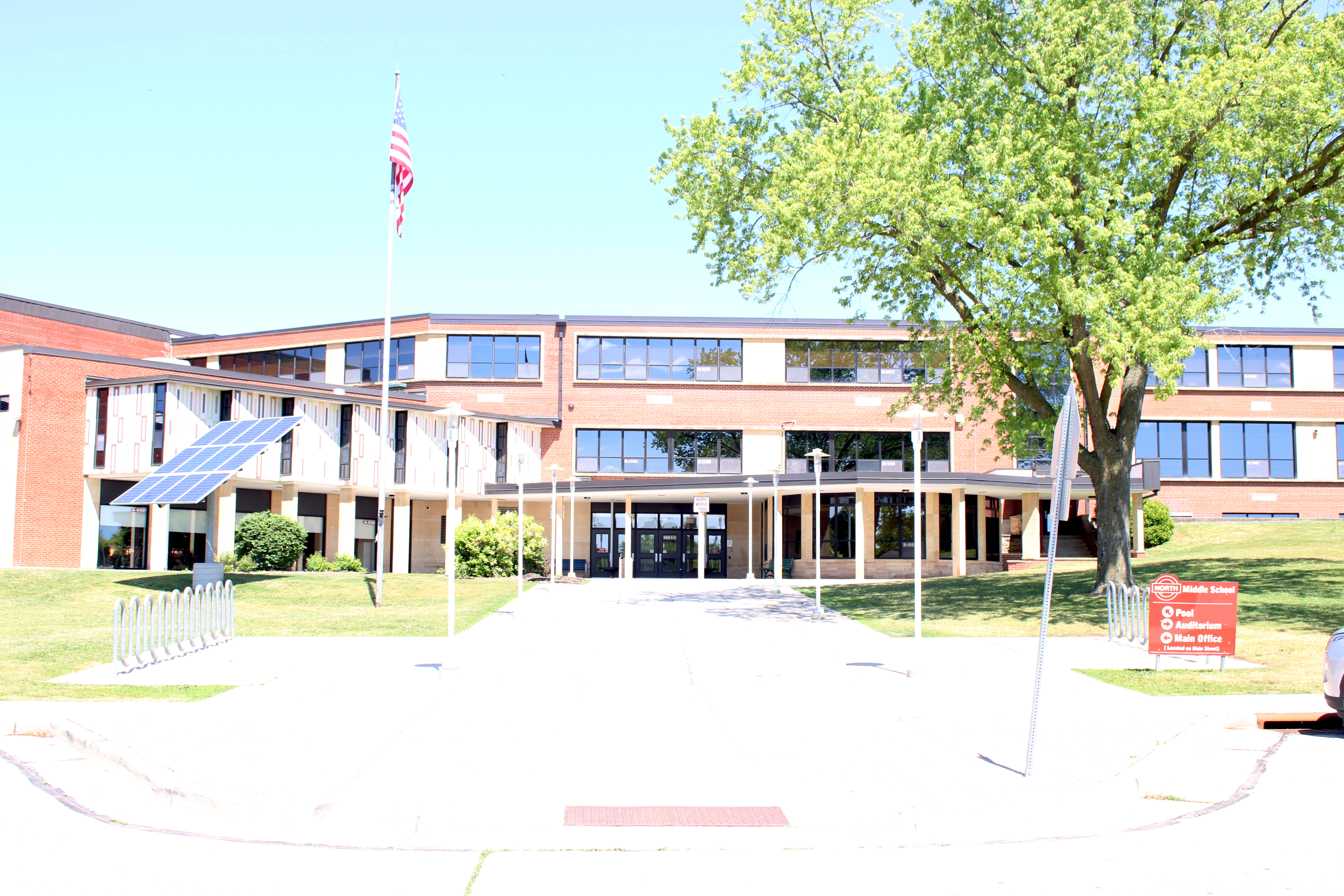
North Middle School

Secondary schools

- North Middle School
- Menomonee Falls High School

Elementary schools

- Valley View Elementary School
- Shady Lane Elementary School
- Riverside Elementary School
- Benjamin Franklin Elementary School
