= David Viaene =

American football player (born 1965)

No. 70, 76
- Position: Offensive tackle

Personal information
- Born: July 14, 1965 (age 61); Appleton, Wisconsin, U.S.
- Listed height: 6 ft 5 in (1.96 m)
- Listed weight: 300 lb (136 kg)

Career information
- High school: Kaukauna (Kaukauna, Wisconsin)
- College: Wisconsin–Platteville (1983–1984); Minnesota Duluth (1985–1987)
- NFL draft: 1988: 8th round, 214th overall pick

Career history
- Houston Oilers (1988); New England Patriots (1989–1991); Green Bay Packers (1992); Pittsburgh Steelers (1993)*
- * Offseason or practice squad member only

Career NFL statistics
- Games played: 21
- Games started: 8
- Stats at Pro Football Reference

David Viaene (born July 14, 1965) is an American former professional football player who was an offensive tackle in the National Football League (NFL). He played college football for the Wisconsin–Platteville Pioneers and Minnesota Duluth Bulldogs and was selected in the eighth round of the 1988 NFL draft by the Houston Oilers. He played for the New England Patriots in 1989 and 1990 and for the Green Bay Packers in 1992. He was also a member of the Pittsburgh Steelers.

== Early life ==
Viaene was born on July 14, 1965, in Appleton, Wisconsin, where he grew up. He had three brothers who played college football and had stints in the NFL: twins Tom and Jim, and Ron. He attended Kaukauna High School in Wisconsin, where he was the state wrestling champion, and graduated in 1983. After high school, Viaene began attending the University of Wisconsin–Platteville.

== College career ==
After playing two years at Wisconsin–Platteville, Viaene transferred to the University of Minnesota Duluth in 1985, sitting out that season due to NCAA transfer rules. He played for the Minnesota Duluth Bulldogs football team from 1986 to 1987 and also played one season for the Minnesota Duluth wrestling team. He was a two-way player in football, seeing action at center, defensive tackle, and long snapper. He recorded 86 tackles as a junior in 1986 and then posted 57 tackles and nine sacks as a senior in 1987. He was named an All-Northern Intercollegiate Conference (NIC) selection for his performance.

Viaene, who stood at 6 feet 5 inches (1.96 m) and weighed 285 pounds (129 kg), helped the Bulldogs to the conference title in the 1987 season. He was considered the team's strongest player and was able to bench press over 500 pounds (230 kg), while he was also able to run 1,500 metres (4,900 ft) in football equipment faster than some of the team's wide receivers and backs. In addition to his success in football, Viaene also won the 1986 NIC heavyweight wrestling championship and finished second at the NAIA national championships. He compiled a record of 10–1 as a Minnesota Duluth wrestler and was named the school's most outstanding senior male athlete in 1987–88. He was invited to the 1988 East–West Shrine Game and was the only football player invited from a non-NCAA Division I school.

== Professional career ==
Viaene was selected in the eighth round (214th overall) of the 1988 NFL draft by the Houston Oilers. As of 2025, he is one of only five Minnesota Duluth alumni to be selected in the draft. He was selected by the Oilers to play center, but later moved to offensive tackle. He was placed on injured reserve on August 28, 1988, and after spending the entire season there, became a Plan B free agent in February 1989. On March 30, 1989, he signed with the New England Patriots. He made the team and appeared in all 16 games as an offensive tackle, starting four as the Patriots compiled a record of 5–11. He returned in 1990 and appeared in four games, each as a starter, before being placed on injured reserve. He missed the entire 1991 season due to injury and then became a free agent in 1992.

Viaene signed with the Green Bay Packers on March 30, 1992. He was released on August 31. After being released, he worked in construction with his father and served as a coach for Kaukauna High School. After an injury to Harvey Salem, the Packers re-signed Viaene in October 1992 as a backup tackle. He appeared in the team's Week 8 game, a loss to the Chicago Bears, and was released two days later. Viaene later signed with the Pittsburgh Steelers on March 17, 1993, but was released later that year, ending his professional career. He finished his NFL career having appeared in 21 games, eight as a starter.

== Personal life ==
Viaene later lived in Hortonville, Wisconsin, and operated a property management business. He and his wife Kelly have two daughters and a son. His son, Ben, played college football for the Minnesota Crookston Golden Eagles.
