= Jeronne Maymon =

American basketball player (born 1991)

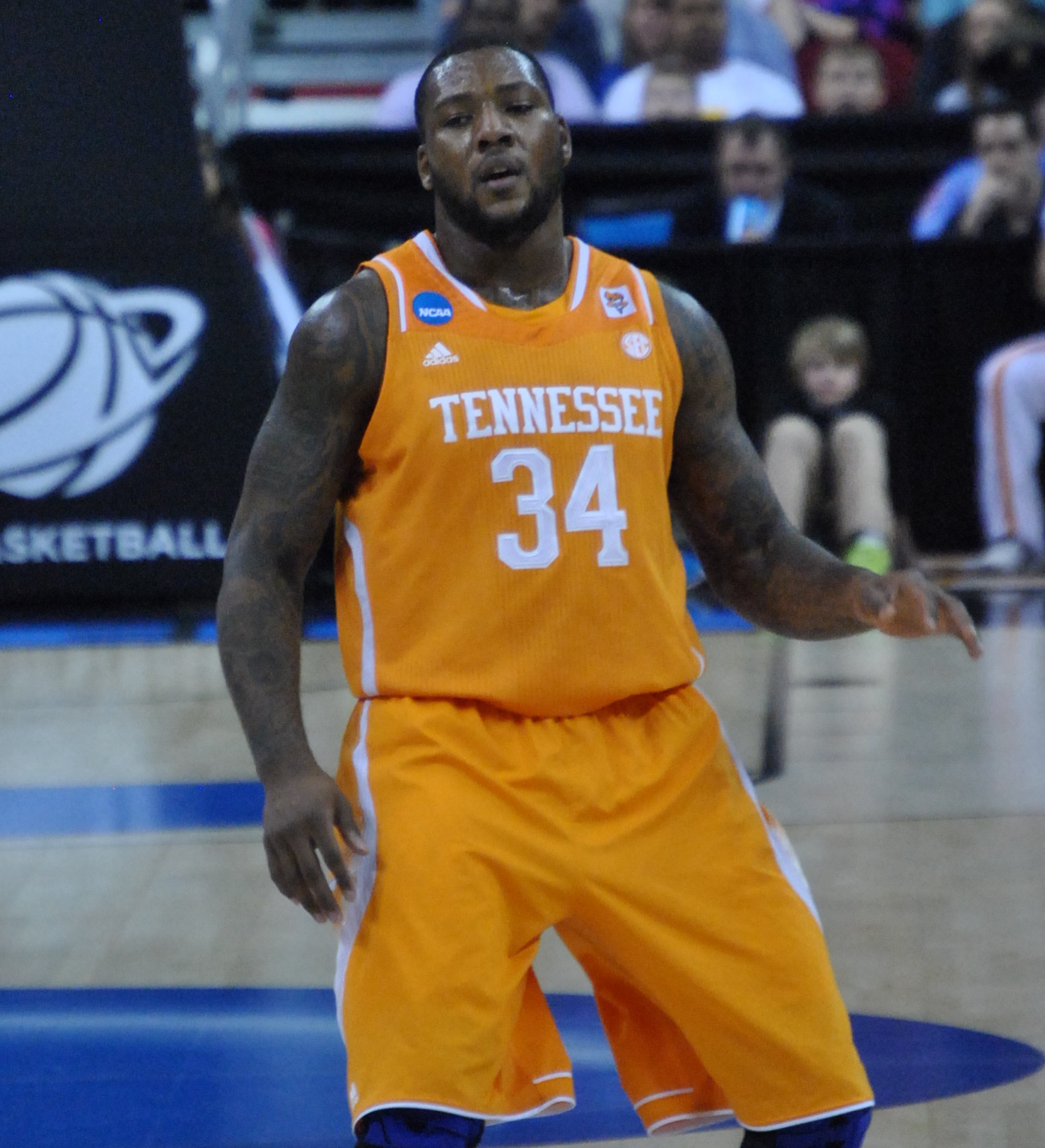
- Maymon playing for Tennessee in 2014

Personal information
- Born: March 6, 1991 (age 35) Madison, Wisconsin, U.S.
- Listed height: 6 ft 8 in (2.03 m)
- Listed weight: 267 lb (121 kg)

Career information
- High school: Madison Memorial (Madison, Wisconsin)
- College: Tennessee (2010–2014)
- NBA draft: 2014: undrafted
- Playing career: 2014–2015
- Position: Forward

Career history
- 2014–2015: Hapoel Tel Aviv

Career highlights
- Second-team All-SEC; Wisconsin Mr. Basketball (2009)

Jeronne Martel Maymon (born March 6, 1991) is an American former professional basketball player who played for the Hapoel Tel Aviv B.C. of the Israeli Basketball Premier League. Jeronne retired on September 18, 2015, after undergoing his third knee surgery in a calendar year and his fifth since 2013.
