= 2021 FIBA U17 Centrobasket =

International youth basketball tournament

Tournament details
- Host country: Mexico
- City: Mexicali
- Dates: 8–12 December 2021
- Teams: 8 (from 1 confederation)
- Venue(s): 1 (in 1 host city)

Final positions
- Champions: Puerto Rico (5th title)
- Runners-up: Mexico
- Third place: Dominican Republic

Official website
- www.fiba.basketball/history

The 2021 FIBA U17 Centrobasket was the eighth edition of the Central American and Caribbean basketball championship for men's under-17 national teams. The tournament was played in Mexicali, Mexico, from 8 to 12 December 2021.

== Participating teams ==
- Aruba
- Costa Rica
- Dominican Republic
- El Salvador
- Jamaica
- Mexico
- Panama
- Puerto Rico

== Group phase ==
In this round, the teams were drawn into two groups of four. The top two teams from each group advanced to the semifinals; the other teams advanced to the 5th–8th place playoffs.

All times are local (Time in Mexico / Zona Noroeste – UTC-8).

=== Group A ===
Pos	Team	Pld	W	L	PF	PA	PD	Pts	Qualification
1	Puerto Rico	3	3	0	284	163	+121	6	Semifinals
2	Costa Rica	3	2	1	223	202	+21	5	Semifinals
3	Panama	3	1	2	244	203	+41	4	5th–8th place playoffs
4	Aruba	3	0	3	122	305	−183	3	5th–8th place playoffs

Source: FIBA

8 December 2021
11:30

Boxscore

Costa Rica	93–41	Aruba
Scoring by quarter: 26–7, 36–4, 16–17, 15–13

Mexicali

8 December 2021
14:30

Boxscore

Panama	70–85	Puerto Rico
Scoring by quarter: 20–15, 10–28, 26–26, 14–16

Mexicali

9 December 2021
11:30

Boxscore

Puerto Rico	95–60	Costa Rica
Scoring by quarter: 23–12, 21–15, 27–16, 24–17

Mexicali

9 December 2021
14:30

Boxscore

Aruba	48–108	Panama
Scoring by quarter: 17–33, 11–15, 7–30, 13–30

Mexicali

10 December 2021
11:30

Boxscore

Costa Rica	70–66	Panama
Scoring by quarter: 12–8, 23–13, 14–14, 21–31

Mexicali

10 December 2021
14:30

Boxscore

Puerto Rico	104–33	Aruba
Scoring by quarter: 29–7, 24–11, 28–7, 23–8

Mexicali

=== Group B ===
Pos	Team	Pld	W	L	PF	PA	PD	Pts	Qualification
1	Mexico (H)	3	3	0	314	178	+136	6	Semifinals
2	Dominican Republic	3	2	1	284	202	+82	5	Semifinals
3	Jamaica	3	1	2	229	298	−69	4	5th–8th place playoffs
4	El Salvador	3	0	3	180	329	−149	3	5th–8th place playoffs

Source: FIBA
(H) Hosts

8 December 2021
17:30

Boxscore

El Salvador	58–114	Dominican Republic
Scoring by quarter: 12–25, 16–36, 7–26, 23–27

Mexicali

8 December 2021
20:30

Boxscore

Mexico	117–67	Jamaica
Scoring by quarter: 24–15, 34–14, 35–18, 24–20

Mexicali

9 December 2021
17:30

Boxscore

Jamaica	95–78	El Salvador
Scoring by quarter: 22–21, 26–19, 23–20, 24–18

Mexicali

9 December 2021
20:30

Boxscore

Dominican Republic	67–77	Mexico
Scoring by quarter: 18–24, 16–27, 15–13, 18–13

Mexicali

10 December 2021
17:30

Boxscore

Jamaica	67–103	Dominican Republic
Scoring by quarter: 18–26, 22–27, 15–23, 12–27

Mexicali

10 December 2021
20:30

Boxscore

El Salvador	44–120	Mexico
Scoring by quarter: 12–30, 9–22, 15–39, 8–29

Mexicali

== 5th–8th place playoffs ==
5th–8th place semifinals
A3	Panama	94
B4	El Salvador	60
B3	Jamaica	81
A4	Aruba	59

5th place match
A3	Panama	82
B3	Jamaica	76
7th place match
B4	El Salvador	73
A4	Aruba	59

=== 5th–8th place semifinals ===
11 December 2021
11:30

Boxscore

Jamaica	81–59	Aruba
Scoring by quarter: 12–12, 31–13, 26–20, 12–14

Mexicali

11 December 2021
14:30

Boxscore

Panama	94–60	El Salvador
Scoring by quarter: 24–15, 20–15, 29–11, 21–19

Mexicali

=== 7th place match ===
12 December 2021
11:30

Boxscore

El Salvador	73–59	Aruba
Scoring by quarter: 31–19, 15–14, 11–15, 16–11

Mexicali

=== 5th place match ===
12 December 2021
14:30

Boxscore

Panama	82–76	Jamaica
Scoring by quarter: 21–23, 22–16, 24–19, 15–18

Mexicali

== Championship playoffs ==
Semifinals
A1	Puerto Rico	81
B2	Dominican Republic	80
B1	Mexico	114
A2	Costa Rica	54

Final
A1	Puerto Rico	81
B1	Mexico	79
3rd place match
B2	Dominican Republic	102
A2	Costa Rica	54

=== Semifinals ===
11 December 2021
17:30

Boxscore

Puerto Rico	81–80	Dominican Republic
Scoring by quarter: 15–11, 19–27, 24–20, 23–22

Mexicali

11 December 2021
20:30

Boxscore

Mexico	114–54	Costa Rica
Scoring by quarter: 30–18, 28–9, 24–15, 32–12

Mexicali

=== 3rd place match ===
12 December 2021
17:30

Boxscore

Dominican Republic	102–54	Costa Rica
Scoring by quarter: 19–15, 26–16, 25–9, 32–14

Mexicali

=== Final ===
12 December 2021
20:30

Boxscore

Puerto Rico	81–79 (OT)	Mexico
Scoring by quarter: 13–20, 20–22, 20–27, 21–5, Overtime: 7–5

Mexicali

== Final standings ==
Rank	Team
1st place, gold medalist(s)	Puerto Rico
2nd place, silver medalist(s)	Mexico
3rd place, bronze medalist(s)	Dominican Republic
4	Costa Rica
5	Panama
6	Jamaica
7	El Salvador
8	Aruba

Qualified for the 2022 FIBA Under-18 Americas Championship
