= 2022 FIBA Under-18 Americas Championship =

12th FIBA Under-18 Americas Basketball Championship

Tournament details
- Host country: Mexico
- City: Tijuana
- Dates: 6–12 June
- Teams: 8 (from 1 confederation)
- Venue: 1 (in 1 host city)

Final positions
- Champions: United States (10th title)
- Runners-up: Brazil
- Third place: Canada

Tournament statistics
- MVP: (United States) Cam Whitmore
- Top scorer: (Canada) Vasean Allette (18.8)
- Top rebounds: (Puerto Rico) Alejandro Aviles (8.7)
- Top assists: (Ecuador) Janer Arcila (6.7)
- PPG (Team): United States (105.2)
- RPG (Team): United States (57.2)
- APG (Team): United States (24.3)

Official website
- www.fiba.basketball/history

The 2022 FIBA Under-18 Americas Championship was an international under-18 basketball tournament that was held from 6 to 12 June 2022 in Tijuana, Baja California, Mexico. The twelfth edition of the biennial competition, this is also the qualifying tournament for FIBA Americas in the 2023 FIBA Under-19 Basketball World Cup in Hungary.

== Hosts selection ==
On 9 May 2022, FIBA Americas has decided to grant Mexico the hosting rights for the FIBA U18 Americas Men's Championship. The city of Tijuana will host the event which will take place from June 6 to 12. The tournament will be played again after the last edition held in 2018, since the 2020 event was canceled due to the COVID-19 pandemic. This will be the first time that Mexico will host the continental under-18 tournament.

== Participating teams ==
- North America:
1. United States
2. Canada
- Central America/Caribbean: (2021 FIBA U17 Centrobasket in Mexicali, Mexico, 8–12 December 2021)
1. Puerto Rico
2. Mexico (Hosts)
3. Dominican Republic
- South America: (2022 FIBA U18 South American Championship in Caracas, Venezuela, 21–26 March 2022)
1. Brazil
2. Argentina
3. Ecuador

== Preliminary round ==
The draw was held on 16 May 2022 in FIBA Americas Regional Office in San Juan, Puerto Rico.

All times are local (UTC-7).

=== Group A ===
Pos	Team	Pld	W	L	PF	PA	PD	Pts	Qualification
1	Brazil	3	2	1	203	182	+21	5	Advance to Quarterfinals
2	Argentina	3	2	1	227	209	+18	5	Advance to Quarterfinals
3	Canada	3	2	1	245	240	+5	5	Advance to Quarterfinals
4	Mexico (H)	3	0	3	189	233	−44	3	Advance to Quarterfinals

Source: FIBA Americas
Rules for classification: 1) Points; 2) Head-to-head results; 3) Points difference; 4) Points scored.
(H) Hosts

6 June 2022
18:00

Boxscore

Argentina	55–60	Brazil
Scoring by quarter: 13–17, 11–18, 11–16, 20–9
Pts: Stenta 14; Rebs: Giovannetti 8 Asts: Bordon 6		Pts: Dos Santos, Klafle 14; Rebs: Dos Santos, Carvalho 6 Asts: Oliveira 6

Auditorio Zonkeys, Tijuana
Referees: Julio César Anaya Freile (PAN), Kristian Páez Arteaga (ECU), Orlando José Varela Díaz (HON)

6 June 2022
20:30

Boxscore

Mexico	75–83	Canada
Scoring by quarter: 14–15, 11–20, 24–26, 26–22
Pts: Camacho, Valdés 16; Rebs: Valdés 8 Asts: Ochoa 5		Pts: Allette 19; Rebs: Benjamin 8 Asts: Allette 4

Auditorio Zonkeys, Tijuana
Referees: Claudio Andrés Osorio Vargas (CHI), Carmelo de la Rosa Alvarez (PUR), Samuel Hidalgo (DOM)

7 June 2022
18:00

Boxscore

Canada	92–97	Argentina
Scoring by quarter: 25–24, 20–31, 21–15, 26–27
Pts: Allette 23; Rebs: Nwoko 9 Asts: three players 2		Pts: Aaliya, Bordon 17; Rebs: Lomello, Trouet 5 Asts: Bordon 8

Auditorio Zonkeys, Tijuana
Referees: Yezid Valentine Carreno Pinzon (COL), Claudio Andrés Osorio Vargas (CHI), Carmelo de la Rosa Alvarez (PUR)

7 June 2022
20:30

Boxscore

Brazil	75–57	Mexico
Scoring by quarter: 23–9, 16–12, 16–16, 20–20
Pts: Klafke 19; Rebs: Dos Santos 8 Asts: Oliveira 8		Pts: Ochoa 16; Rebs: Valdés 9 Asts: Ochoa 2

Auditorio Zonkeys, Tijuana
Referees: Kristian Páez Arteaga (ECU), Orlando José Varela Díaz (HON), Samuel Hidalgo (DOM)

8 June 2022
18:00

Boxscore

Brazil	68–70	Canada
Scoring by quarter: 13–16, 20–23, 20–18, 15–13
Pts: Dos Santos 28; Rebs: Landeira 8 Asts: Landeira 3		Pts: Allette 18; Rebs: Allette 10; Asts: Allette 5

Auditorio Zonkeys, Tijuana
Referees: Carmelo de la Rosa Alvarez (PUR), Kristian Páez Arteaga (ECU), Orlando José Varela Díaz (HON)

8 June 2022
20:30

Boxscore

Mexico	57–75	Argentina
Scoring by quarter: 15–23, 8–20, 16–10, 18–22
Pts: Ochoa 18; Rebs: Valdés 8 Asts: Guerrero, Valdés 2		Pts: Giovannetti 17; Rebs: Collomb 6 Asts: Bordon 6

Auditorio Zonkeys, Tijuana
Referees: Julio César Anaya Freile (PAN), Claudio Andrés Osorio Vargas (CHI), Samuel Hidalgo (DOM)

=== Group B ===
Pos	Team	Pld	W	L	PF	PA	PD	Pts	Qualification
1	United States	3	3	0	339	144	+195	6	Advance to Quarterfinals
2	Puerto Rico	3	2	1	205	225	−20	5	Advance to Quarterfinals
3	Ecuador	3	1	2	178	279	−101	4	Advance to Quarterfinals
4	Dominican Republic	3	0	3	180	254	−74	3	Advance to Quarterfinals

Source: FIBA Americas
Rules for classification: 1) Points; 2) Head-to-head results; 3) Points difference; 4) Points scored.

6 June 2022
13:00

Boxscore

Ecuador	64–85	Puerto Rico
Scoring by quarter: 12–20, 14–25, 20–19, 18–21
Pts: Arcila 22; Rebs: Caicedo 14; Asts: Recalde 5		Pts: Rivera 24; Rebs: Avilés 11; Asts: Peguero, Rivera 3

Auditorio Zonkeys, Tijuana
Referees: Yezid Valentine Carreno Pinzon (COL), Franco Ronconi (ARG), Juan Fabián Valenzuela Estrada (MEX)

6 June 2022
15:30

Boxscore

Dominican Republic	48–116	United States
Scoring by quarter: 12–30, 8–29, 13–30, 15–27
Pts: Osorio 11; Rebs: Hichez, Núñez 8 Asts: Gutiérrez 3		Pts: Ware 17; Rebs: Dailey Jr. 10; Asts: Trimble 5

Auditorio Zonkeys, Tijuana
Referees: Waseem Husainy (CAN), Fernando Aparecido Cavalcante Leite (BRA), Jesús López Díaz (MEX)

7 June 2022
13:00

Boxscore

Puerto Rico	65–61 (OT)	Dominican Republic
Scoring by quarter: 12–11, 7–16, 26–13, 14–19, Overtime: 6–2
Pts: Avilés 13; Rebs: Ortiz 12; Asts: Rodríguez 3		Pts: Suárez 12; Rebs: Daniel 16; Asts: Daniel 4

Auditorio Zonkeys, Tijuana
Referees: Julio César Anaya Freile (PAN), Franco Ronconi (ARG), Juan Fabián Valenzuela Estrada (MEX)

7 June 2022
15:30

Boxscore

United States	123–41	Ecuador
Scoring by quarter: 26–9, 29–8, 34–10, 34–14
Pts: McCain 22; Rebs: Jackson 12; Asts: Rodgers, Black 6		Pts: Caicedo 17; Rebs: Arcila 12; Asts: Arcila 3

Auditorio Zonkeys, Tijuana
Referees: Fernando Aparecido Cavalcante Leite (BRA), Waseem Husainy (CAN), Jesús López Díaz (MEX)

8 June 2022
13:00

Boxscore

Ecuador	73–71	Dominican Republic
Scoring by quarter: 17–21, 16–8, 21–20, 19–22
Pts: Caicedo 27; Rebs: Noboa 10; Asts: Arcila, Recalde 7		Pts: Muhammad 19; Rebs: Suárez 18; Asts: Suárez 3

Auditorio Zonkeys, Tijuana
Referees: Waseem Husainy (CAN), Yezid Valentine Carreno Pinzon (COL), Jesús López Díaz (MEX)

8 June 2022
15:30

Boxscore

United States	100–55	Puerto Rico
Scoring by quarter: 22–15, 28–14, 24–13, 26–13
Pts: Whitmore 24; Rebs: Black 11; Asts: Armstrong 8		Pts: Ortiz 17; Rebs: Ortiz 9 Asts: Ortiz, Rivera 3

Auditorio Zonkeys, Tijuana
Referees: Fernando Aparecido Cavalcante Leite (BRA), Franco Ronconi (ARG), Juan Fabián Valenzuela Estrada (MEX)

== Knockout stage ==
=== Bracket ===
Fifth place
2B	Puerto Rico	86
4A	Mexico	82
Seventh place
4B	Dominican Republic	96
3B	Ecuador	75

5–8th place semifinals
4B	Dominican Republic	71
2B	Puerto Rico	74
3B	Ecuador	62
4A	Mexico	73

Quarterfinals
1A	Brazil	66
4B	Dominican Republic	52
3A	Canada	86
2B	Puerto Rico	78
2A	Argentina	92
3B	Ecuador	47
4A	Mexico	64
1B	United States	92

Semifinals
1A	Brazil	78
3A	Canada	77
2A	Argentina	60
1B	United States	98

Final
1A	Brazil	60
1B	United States	102
Third place
3A	Canada	81
2A	Argentina	57

=== Quarterfinals ===
10 June 2022
11:30

Boxscore

Brazil	66–52	Dominican Republic
Scoring by quarter: 13–12, 19–10, 22–13, 12–17
Pts: Tesch 23; Rebs: Tesch 2 Asts: Landeira 4		Pts: Daniel 11; Rebs: Suárez 9 Asts: three players 1

Auditorio Zonkeys, Tijuana
Referees: Julio César Anaya Freile (PAN), Franco Ronconi (ARG), Juan Fabián Valenzuela Estrada (MEX)

10 June 2022
14:00

Boxscore

Puerto Rico	78–86	Canada
Scoring by quarter: 9–13, 21–27, 24–26, 24–20
Pts: Rivera 18; Rebs: Avilés, Rodriguez Jr. 11; Asts: Avilés 3		Pts: Dumont 16; Rebs: Nwoko 12; Asts: five players 2

Auditorio Zonkeys, Tijuana
Referees: Kristian Páez Arteaga (ECU), Claudio Andrés Osorio Vargas (CHI), Jesús López Díaz (MEX)

10 June 2022
16:30

Boxscore

Argentina	92–47	Ecuador
Scoring by quarter: 22–11, 20–19, 27–13, 23–4
Pts: Marchiaro 18; Rebs: Collomb 8 Asts: Bordon 5		Pts: Arcila 13; Rebs: Caicedo 8 Asts: Recalde 5

Auditorio Zonkeys, Tijuana
Referees: Waseem Husainy (CAN), Carmelo de La Rosa Alvarez (PUR), Samuel Hidalgo (DOM)

ben

10 June 2022
19:00

Boxscore

United States	92–64	Mexico
Scoring by quarter: 10–18, 33–16, 25–16, 24–14
Pts: Whitmore 27; Rebs: Black 11; Asts: Carlyle 5		Pts: Ochoa, Valdés 13; Rebs: Guerrero, Valdés 7 Asts: Valdés 6

Auditorio Zonkeys, Tijuana
Referees: Fernando Leite (BRA), Orlando Varela Díaz (HON), Yezid Carreno Pinzon (COL)

=== 5–8th place semifinals ===
11 June 2022
09:30

Boxscore

Dominican Republic	71–74	Puerto Rico
Scoring by quarter: 7–20, 26–14, 18–19, 20–18
Pts: Suárez 18; Rebs: Osorio 8 Asts: Daniel 4		Pts: Avilés 18; Rebs: Avilés, Ortiz 8 Asts: Delgado 3

Auditorio Zonkeys, Tijuana
Referees: Waseem Husainy (CAN), Yezid Carreno Pinzon (COL), Jesús López Díaz (MEX)

11 June 2022
12:00

Boxscore

Ecuador	62–73	Mexico
Scoring by quarter: 11–18, 15–27, 14–17, 22–11
Pts: Alvarez 16; Rebs: Noboa 9 Asts: Arcila 10		Pts: Ochoa 16; Rebs: Valdés 11; Asts: Valdés 4

Auditorio Zonkeys, Tijuana
Referees: Fernando Leite (BRA), Franco Ronconi (ARG), Claudio Andrés Osorio Vargas (CHI)

=== Semifinals ===
11 June 2022
14:30

Boxscore

Brazil	78–77	Canada
Scoring by quarter: 17–30, 13–18, 30–13, 18–16
Pts: Santos 22; Rebs: Bersch Klafke, Farias Cardoso 8 Asts: Santos 5		Pts: Allette 22; Rebs: Nwoko 13; Asts: Allette 5

Auditorio Zonkeys, Tijuana
Referees: Julio César Anaya Freile (PAN), Carmelo de La Rosa Alvarez (PUR), Juan Fabián Valenzuela Estrada (MEX)

11 June 2022
17:00

Boxscore

Argentina	60–98	United States
Scoring by quarter: 15–20, 8–28, 15–31, 22–19
Pts: Bordon 16; Rebs: Marchiaro, Giralt 6 Asts: Giralt 3		Pts: Ware 17; Rebs: Dailey Jr. 9 Asts: Dailey Jr., Armstrong 3

Auditorio Zonkeys, Tijuana
Referees: Orlando Varela Díaz (HON), Kristian Páez Arteaga (ECU), Samuel Hidalgo (DOM)

=== Seventh place game ===
12 June 2022
09:30

Boxscore

Dominican Republic	96–75	Ecuador
Scoring by quarter: 18–21, 25–21, 26–20, 27–13
Pts: Osorio 23; Rebs: Hichez, Suero 11; Asts: Suárez 4		Pts: Caicedo 29; Rebs: Caicedo 7 Asts: Arcila 12

Auditorio Zonkeys, Tijuana
Referees: Claudio Andrés Osorio Vargas (CHI), Juan Fabián Valenzuela Estrada (MEX), Orlando José Varela Díaz (HON)

=== Fifth place game ===
12 June 2022
12:00

Boxscore

Puerto Rico	86–82	Mexico
Scoring by quarter: 25–22, 21–23, 23–14, 17–23
Pts: Avilés 23; Rebs: Ortiz 8 Asts: Delgado 7		Pts: Ochoa, Valdés 23; Rebs: Ochoa 7 Asts: Ochoa, Guerrero 5

Auditorio Zonkeys, Tijuana
Referees: Yezid Valentine Carreno Pinzon (COL), Kristian Páez Arteaga (ECU), Samuel Hidalgo (DOM)

=== Third place game ===
12 June 2022
14:30

Boxscore

Canada	81–57	Argentina
Scoring by quarter: 13–10, 20–21, 25–17, 23–9
Pts: Allette, Nwoko 20; Rebs: Fisher 12; Asts: Fisher 8		Pts: Trouet 12; Rebs: Trouet 12; Asts: Rodríguez, Giovannetti 3

Auditorio Zonkeys, Tijuana
Referees: Carmelo de La Rosa Alvarez (PUR), Fernando Aparecido Cavalcante Leite (BRA), Jesús López Díaz (MEX)

=== Final ===
12 June 2022
17:00

Boxscore

Brazil	60–102	United States
Scoring by quarter: 9–28, 13–29, 17–27, 21–18
Pts: Santos 15; Rebs: Carvalho 8 Asts: four players 2		Pts: Whitmore 30; Rebs: Whitmore 12; Asts: Trimble 4

Auditorio Zonkeys, Tijuana
Referees: Julio César Anaya Freile (PAN), Waseem Husainy (CAN), Franco Ronconi (ARG)

== Statistics and awards ==
=== Awards ===
2022 FIBA Americas Under-18
Championship winners

United States
10th title

Most Valuable Player
(United States) Cam Whitmore

All Tournament Team

- (Argentina) Dylan Bordon
- (Canada) Vasean Allette
- (Brazil) Reynan dos Santos
- (United States) Cam Whitmore
- (United States) Kel'el Ware

== Final ranking ==
Qualified for the 2023 FIBA Under-19 Basketball World Cup

Rank	Team	Record
1st place, gold medalist(s)	United States	6–0
2nd place, silver medalist(s)	Brazil	4–2
3rd place, bronze medalist(s)	Canada	4–2
4	Argentina	3–3
5	Puerto Rico	4–2
6	Mexico	1-5
7	Dominican Republic	1–5
8	Ecuador	1-5
