= Brett Hartmann =

American football player (born 1987)

No. 2
- Position: Punter

Personal information
- Born: August 17, 1987 (age 39); Menomonee Falls, Wisconsin, U.S.
- Listed height: 6 ft 4 in (1.93 m)
- Listed weight: 227 lb (103 kg)

Career information
- High school: Menomonee Falls
- College: Central Michigan (2006–2010)
- NFL draft: 2011: undrafted

Career history
- Houston Texans (2011–2012)

Career NFL statistics
- Punts: 58
- Punt yards: 2,573
- Average: 44.4
- Stats at Pro Football Reference

Brett Hartmann (born August 17, 1987) is an American former professional football player who was a punter and kickoff specialist in the National Football League (NFL). He played college football for the Central Michigan Chippewas and was signed by the Houston Texans as an undrafted free agent in 2011. He was forced to retire after he suffered a career-ending knee injury.

== Early life ==
Hartmann attended Menomonee Falls High School in Menomonee Falls, Wisconsin, and was a student and a letterman in football.

== Professional career ==
Hartmann was eligible for the 2011 NFL draft but was not selected. He was signed with the Houston Texans on July 28, 2011 as an undrafted free agent. He was released for the final roster cutdown, but was re-signed by the Texans after they released punter Brad Maynard. After playing in every game for the Texans, Hartmann suffered a torn anterior cruciate ligament (ACL) against the Atlanta Falcons on December 4, and was placed on injured reserve on December 6, ending his season. On November 15, 2012, Hartmann sued the county agency that operates Reliant Stadium, blaming "unsafe turf" for a possibly career-ending knee injury.

In 2012, Hartmann was suspended for four games by the league for violating the league's substance policy, and was replaced by Donnie Jones. Hartmann's suspension was later reduced to three. Hartmann was released during pre-season cutdowns, and as a free agent, his suspension was extended by eight more games on September 24, 2012.
