= Seth Trimble =

American basketball player (born 2004)

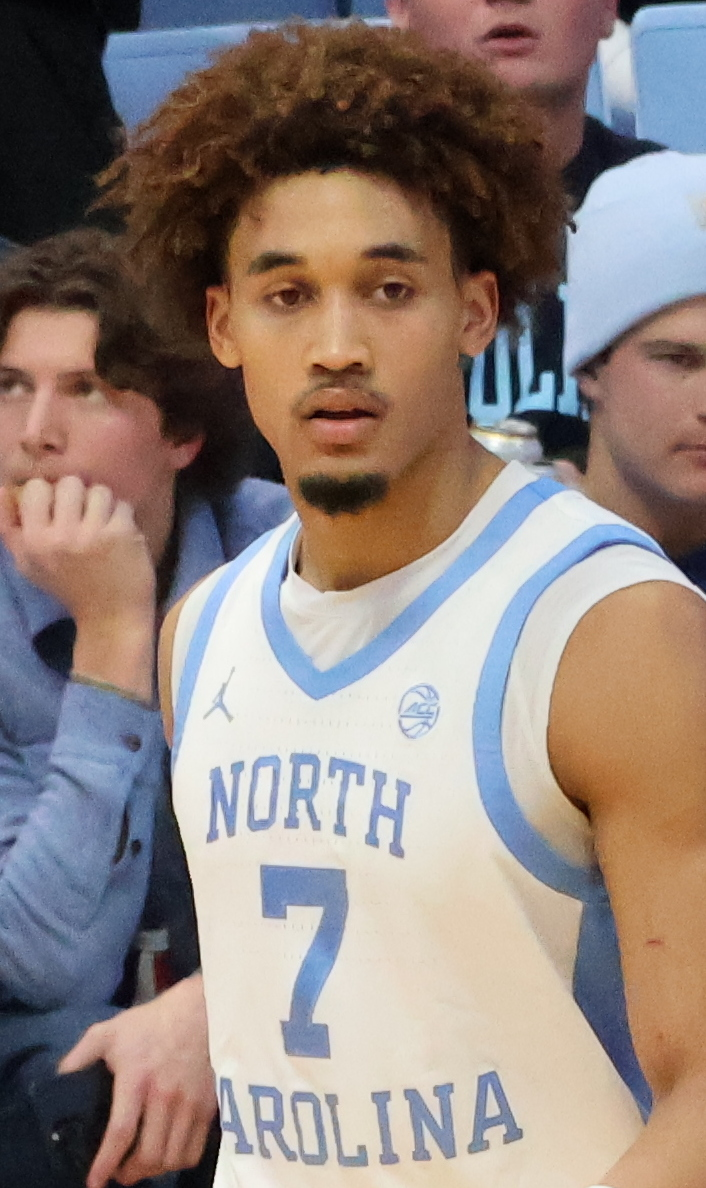
- Trimble with North Carolina in 2025

No. 5 – Louisville Cardinals
- Position: Shooting guard
- League: Atlantic Coast Conference

Personal information
- Born: August 9, 2004 (age 22) Wauwatosa, Wisconsin, U.S.
- Listed height: 6 ft 3 in (1.91 m)
- Listed weight: 200 lb (91 kg)

Career information
- High school: Menomonee Falls (Menomonee Falls, Wisconsin)
- College: North Carolina (2022–2026); Louisville (2026–present)
- NBA draft: 2026: undrafted

Career highlights
- Wisconsin Mr. Basketball (2022)
Medals
Men's basketball
Representing the United States
FIBA Americas Under-18 Championship
Gold medal – first place	2022 Mexico	Team

Seth Louis Trimble (born August 9, 2004) is an American college basketball player for the Louisville Cardinals of the Atlantic Coast Conference (ACC). He has previously played for the North Carolina Tar Heels.

== High school ==
Trimble, a 6'3 guard from Wauwatosa, Wisconsin, attended Menomonee Falls High School and as a senior averaged 27.1 points, 7.4 rebounds, 4.4 assists and 2.3 steals. At the close of the season, he was named Wisconsin Mr. Basketball. That summer, Trimble was a member of the United States U18 team which won the gold medal at the 2022 FIBA Under-18 Americas Championship.

== College career ==
Trimble committed to North Carolina over Michigan, following in the footsteps of his older brother, JP Tokoto, who had played for the Tar Heels from 2012 to 2015. He played sparingly for the Tar Heels as a freshman, averaging 1.8 points in 9.8 minutes per game. As a sophomore, Trimble became the Tar Heels' primary backcourt reserve, averaging 17.1 minutes and 5.2 points per game while shining defensively. At the close of the season, Trimble finished third in ACC Sixth Man of the Year award voting.

Following his sophomore season, Trimble opted to enter the transfer portal. However, he later changed his mind and decided to return to UNC for his junior year.

Trimble emerged as one of North Carolina's key contributors in his junior year, starting 18 games and playing a career-high 28.7 minutes per game across 34 appearances. He averaged 11.6 points, 5.0 rebounds, 1.3 assists, and a team-high 1.4 steals per game, shooting 42.8% from the field and 82.1% from the free-throw line. The team finished the 2024–25 season 22–13 and received a controversial 11-seed in the NCAA Tournament First Four.

Trimble entered his senior year as the team's top returning scorer and was widely regarded as one of the program's primary leaders. In November 2025, Trimble suffered a broken bone in his left forearm during a weight room workout, and subsequently missed nine games. Upon returning for ACC play, Trimble delivered one of the most memorable moments in the UNC-Duke rivalry. On February 7, 2026, with No. 14 North Carolina tied to No. 4 Duke 68-68 with seven seconds remaining, Trimble buried a game-winning 3-pointer with 0.4 seconds on the clock, lifting the Tar Heels to a 71-68 comeback victory on their home court. He finished the season averaging a career high 14.0 points, with 3.8 rebounds and 3.0 assists across 24 games.

== Professional career ==
On June 26, 2026, after going unselected in the 2026 NBA draft, Trimble signed with the Washington Wizards on an Exhibit 10 contract to play for their Summer League team.

== Personal life ==
Trimble is the grandson of former Cameroonian soccer player Jean-Pierre Tokoto.
