= John H. Niebler =

American politician

John Niebler

Member of the Wisconsin State Assembly
- In office 1972–1974
- Succeeded by: Ronald H. Lingren

Personal details
- Born: November 4, 1941 (age 84) Milwaukee, Wisconsin
- Party: Republican
- Children: 5
- Education: Marquette University (AB); University of Wisconsin (JD)

John Niebler (born November 4, 1941) is an American politician and attorney who served as a member of the Wisconsin State Assembly from 1972 to 1974.

== Early life and education ==
Niebler was born in Milwaukee, Wisconsin. He graduated from Menomonee Falls High School in Menomonee Falls, Wisconsin. Niebler earned a Bachelor of Arts degree from Marquette University and a Juris Doctor from the University of Wisconsin Law School.

== Career ==
After graduating from law school, Niebler worked as a legislative intern and Wisconsin Supreme Court clerk. Niebler was elected to the Assembly in 1972. Additionally, he was a member of the Waukesha County, Wisconsin Board of Supervisors from 1966 to 1972. Niebler was defeated by Ronald H. Lingren in 1974. He is a Republican. Since leaving the Assembly, Niebler has worked as an attorney.

== Personal life ==
Niebler is married and has five children.
