= Victor Nehs =

American lawyer, soldier, and politician

Victor W. Nehs (July 28, 1887 – September 11, 1949) was an American lawyer, soldier, and politician.

Born Menomonee Falls, Wisconsin, Nehs went to Marshfield High School in Marshfield, Wisconsin. He served in the Wisconsin Army National Guard and was in the Pancho Villa Expedition and World War I. Nehs was in the wholesale and retail ice cream business. In 1913, Nehs was admitted to the Wisconsin bar after graduating from University of Wisconsin Law School. Nehs practiced law in Loyal, Wisconsin and then in Neillsville, Wisconsin. Nehs served as city attorney and mayor of Neilsville. He also served on the school board. Nehs served as Clark County, Wisconsin district attorney and on the Clark County Board of Supervisor and was chairman of the county board. Nehs served in the Wisconsin State Assembly from 1935 to 1939 on the Progressive ticket. Nehs died in Neillsville, Wisconsin of a heart ailment.
