= Gowrie, Iowa =

- City
- Location of Gowrie, Iowa
- Coordinates: 42°16′41″N 94°17′23″W
- Country: USA
- State: Iowa
- County: Webster

Area
  - Total: 1.44 sq mi (3.73 km^{2})
  - Land: 1.44 sq mi (3.73 km^{2})
  - Water: 0 sq mi (0.00 km^{2})
- Elevation: 1,135 ft (346 m)

Population (2020)
  - Total: 952
  - Density: 661.6/sq mi (255.45/km^{2})
- Time zone: UTC-6 (Central (CST))
  - Summer (DST): UTC-5 (CDT)
- ZIP code: 50543
- Area code: 515
- FIPS code: 19-31710
- GNIS feature ID: 2394939

Gowrie is a city in Webster County, Iowa, United States. The population was 952 at the time of the 2020 census.

== History ==
A post office called Gowrie has been in operation since 1871. The city was named after Gowrie, in Scotland.

Gowrie began as a stop on the railroad. It grew in its early years as the Swedish settlers built a local economy which served area farmers. Today, the town has a swimming pool, golf course, athletic stadium, and curb-and-gutter throughout the town.

Historically, its peak was 1970, and at that time the downtown area had the following businesses: (* designate companies still in business) Gowrie Municipal Swimming Pool*, Gowrie Gowrie Youth Center/Skating Rink*, Johnson RediMix, Johnson Sinclair Service, Bruntlett Elevator*, Johnson Lumber Company, Gowrie Dry Clean, Carr's Grocery, Gambles Hardware, Webster-Calhoun Co-op Telephone Co.*, Sunray DX, Palmer and Son's Funeral Home*, Dairy Sweet, Buskee Industries, Gowrie Car Wash, Ranniger's Appliance, Ranniger's Water Care, Imels Clothing, Wendells Appliances, Redman Barber Shop, Erb Law Offices, Dr. Rungee, DDS, Dr. Borgen, MD, Paladium Lanes Bowling Alley, First National Bank, Gowrie Cafe, Palmer Hardware, Hasty's Cafe, Smith's Meat Market, Gowrie Star Theater, Earl Braend Ford, The Canteen, Larson's Phillip 66, Standard Gas Station, VFW, Gowrie Library, Lee Benson Motors*, Pontiac, Jansa TV Repair, Laundromat, Skip's Tap, Lane Barber Shop, The White House Sundry, and The Gowrie News*. Other businesses in town included: Dixon Hatcheries, Hubbard Veterinary Clinic, Lizer Sale barn, Anderson Elevator, Gowrie Municipal Golf Course*, Swanson Florist and Garden Center*, and the COOP.

== Geography ==
According to the United States Census Bureau, the city has a total area of 1.45 square miles (3.76 km^{2}), all land.

== Demographics ==
Historical populations
Year	Pop.	±%
1880	261	—
1890	526	+101.5%
1900	681	+29.5%
1910	829	+21.7%
1920	895	+8.0%
1930	1,059	+18.3%
1940	1,028	−2.9%
1950	1,052	+2.3%
1960	1,127	+7.1%
1970	1,225	+8.7%
1980	1,089	−11.1%
1990	1,028	−5.6%
2000	1,038	+1.0%
2010	1,037	−0.1%
2020	952	−8.2%
Source:"U.S. Census website". United States Census Bureau. and Iowa Data Center; Source: U.S. Decennial Census

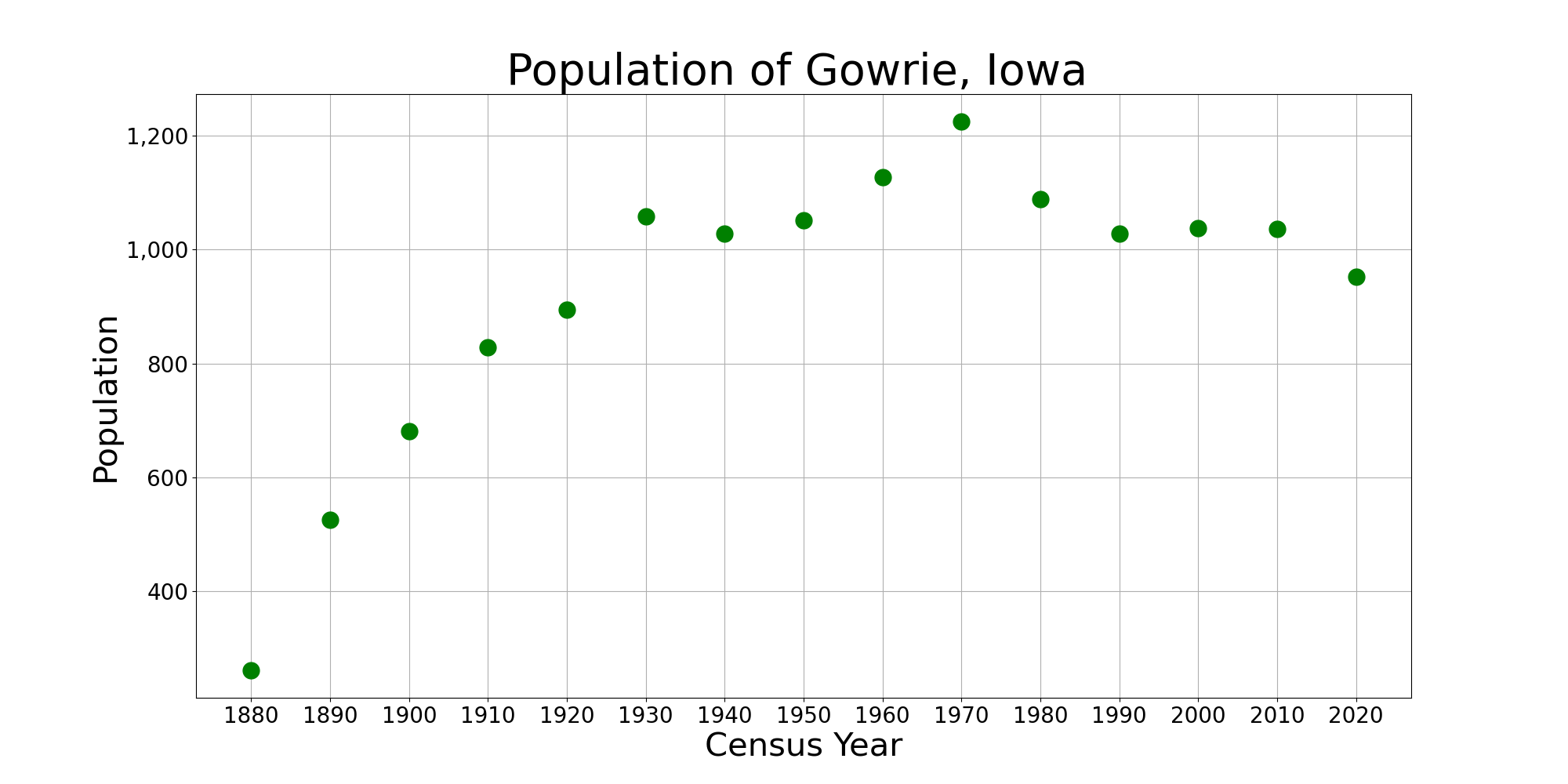
The population of Gowrie, Iowa from US census data

=== 2020 census ===
As of the census of 2020, there were 952 people, 412 households, and 251 families residing in the city. The population density was 661.6 inhabitants per square mile (255.4/km^{2}). There were 472 housing units at an average density of 328.0 per square mile (126.7/km^{2}). The racial makeup of the city was 91.6% White, 0.7% Black or African American, 0.1% Native American, 0.4% Asian, 0.0% Pacific Islander, 0.3% from other races and 6.8% from two or more races. Hispanic or Latino persons of any race comprised 5.9% of the population.

Of the 412 households, 25.5% of which had children under the age of 18 living with them, 44.9% were married couples living together, 6.6% were cohabitating couples, 30.3% had a female householder with no spouse or partner present and 18.2% had a male householder with no spouse or partner present. 39.1% of all households were non-families. 33.3% of all households were made up of individuals, 16.0% had someone living alone who was 65 years old or older.

The median age in the city was 43.3 years. 24.7% of the residents were under the age of 20; 5.3% were between the ages of 20 and 24; 21.5% were from 25 and 44; 25.5% were from 45 and 64; and 23.0% were 65 years of age or older. The gender makeup of the city was 48.4% male and 51.6% female.

=== 2010 census ===
As of the census of 2010, there were 1,037 people, 442 households, and 281 families living in the city. The population density was 715.2 inhabitants per square mile (276.1/km^{2}). There were 489 housing units at an average density of 337.2 per square mile (130.2/km^{2}). The racial makeup of the city was 97.7% White, 1.0% African American, 0.1% Native American, 0.2% Asian, and 1.1% from two or more races. Hispanic or Latino of any race were 1.6% of the population.

There were 442 households, of which 33.0% had children under the age of 18 living with them, 47.1% were married couples living together, 12.4% had a female householder with no husband present, 4.1% had a male householder with no wife present, and 36.4% were non-families. 33.3% of all households were made up of individuals, and 19.9% had someone living alone who was 65 years of age or older. The average household size was 2.28 and the average family size was 2.88.

The median age in the city was 45.2 years. 25.4% of residents were under the age of 18; 5.6% were between the ages of 18 and 24; 18.8% were from 25 to 44; 25.9% were from 45 to 64; and 24.4% were 65 years of age or older. The gender makeup of the city was 46.6% male and 53.4% female.

=== 2000 census ===
As of the census of 2000, there were 1,038 people, 429 households, and 277 families living in the city. The population density was 709.4 inhabitants per square mile (273.9/km^{2}). There were 468 housing units at an average density of 319.8 per square mile (123.5/km^{2}). The racial makeup of the city was 98.36% White, 0.19% African American, 0.29% Native American, 0.39% Asian, 0.29% from other races, and 0.48% from two or more races. Hispanic or Latino of any race were 1.06% of the population.

There were 429 households, out of which 28.7% had children under the age of 18 living with them, 54.5% were married couples living together, 7.7% had a female householder with no husband present, and 35.4% were non-families. 32.9% of all households were made up of individuals, and 21.7% had someone living alone who was 65 years of age or older. The average household size was 2.32 and the average family size was 2.96.

24.5% are under the age of 18, 6.7% from 18 to 24, 21.2% from 25 to 44, 20.7% from 45 to 64, and 26.9% who were 65 years of age or older. The median age was 43 years. For every 100 females, there were 84.4 males. For every 100 females age 18 and over, there were 79.0 males.

The median income for a household in the city was $36,136, and the median income for a family was $44,342. Males had a median income of $30,398 versus $20,278 for females. The per capita income for the city was $17,348. About 4.0% of families and 6.2% of the population were below the poverty line, including 8.0% of those under age 18 and 5.9% of those age 65 or over.

== Education ==
It is in the Southeast Valley Community School District. Southeast Valley High School in Gowrie is that district's comprehensive high school.

Previously, Gowrie was served by the Prairie Valley Community School District, which formed on July 1, 1993 with the merger of the Cedar Valley Community School District and the Prairie Community School District. In 2023 that district merged into the Southeast Valley district.

== Arts and culture ==
Each year, the town hosts the Gowrie Fourth of July Celebration, which draws thousands of people from around the state for the parade, fireworks, carnival, and bandshell performances. The parade is the longest running consecutive parade in Iowa, beginning in 1873 and continuing each year since.

Several churches are located in the community, including both Methodist and Lutheran churches. Zion Evangelical Lutheran Church, an open-arched structure, was built by hometown business, Johnson Lumber Company, owned by Axel and Carl Johnson, and was completed in March, 1931.

== Notable people ==
- Darrell Huff, writer
- Everett Franklin Lindquist, educator and creator of the ACT
- Ronald H. Lingren, clinical psychologist and member of the Wisconsin State Assembly
- Carl A. Youngdale, decorated Major general in the United States Marine Corps
