= Ronald H. Lingren =

American politician

Ronald Lindgren

Member of the Wisconsin State Assembly
- In office 1974–1980
- Preceded by: John H. Niebler

Personal details
- Born: June 26, 1935 Gowrie, Iowa
- Died: June 1, 2015 (aged 79) Jacksonville Beach, Florida
- Children: 2
- Education: Iowa State University (BS); University of Iowa (PhD)

Military service
- Branch/service: United States Army; United States Air Force

Ronald H. Lingren (June 26, 1935 – June 1, 2015) was an American academic and politician who served as a member of the Wisconsin State Assembly.

== Early life and education ==
Lingren was born in Gowrie, Iowa. His father was a farmer and his mother was a teacher. Lindgren was one of four children. He earned a bachelor's degree from Iowa State University and a PhD in clinical psychology from the University of Iowa.

== Career ==
After earning his doctorate, Lingren became a member of the faculty of the University of Wisconsin–Milwaukee. He was also a member of the United States Army and the Air Force Reserve Command.

Lingren was elected to the Wisconsin State Assembly in 1974, defeating incumbent John H. Niebler, and was re-elected in 1976 and 1978. He was a Democrat.

Lingren had two children. He died in Jacksonville Beach, Florida.
