= Kaukauna High School =

Coordinates: 44.2574°N 88.2571°W

Location
- 1701 County Road CE; Kaukauna, Wisconsin 54130; United States

Information
- Type: public secondary
- School district: Kaukauna Area School District
- Principal: Aaron Herm
- Staff: 76.53 (FTE of classroom teachers)
- Grades: 9-12
- Enrollment: 1,260 (2023-2024)
- Student to teacher ratio: 16.46
- Colors: Orange and Black
- Mascot: Galloping Ghost
- Website: khs.kaukauna.k12.wi.us

Kaukauna High School is a public high school in Kaukauna, Wisconsin, the only high school in the Kaukauna Area School District. As of the 2022-23 school year, the school had 1,261 students in grades 9 through 12. It is the only public high school serving the city of Kaukauna and the surrounding area.

The first Kaukauna High School, built in the late 19th century, was expanded twice and replaced with a new building on a different site in 1999; the old building is now River View Middle School. The current Kaukauna High School campus, located on County Road CE, has facilities to support academic, athletic, and extracurricular programs. The school is equipped with science labs, a performing arts auditorium, and technology labs. Its athletic facilities include two gymnasiums, turf football, soccer, baseball, and softball fields, a turf indoor practice facility, fitness center, and tennis courts.

== Academics ==
Kaukauna High School offers academic programs designed to prepare students for post-secondary education and careers. The school's curriculum includes Advanced Placement (AP) courses, dual-credit options with local colleges, and both college preparatory and vocational tracks.

The school’s academic departments include:

• English • Mathematics • Science • Social Studies • World Languages • Fine Arts • Technical Education • Physical Education • Business Education • Family and Consumer Sciences

In addition to core subjects, students have access to elective courses, as well as career and technical education (CTE) pathways.

== Athletics ==
Kaukauna High participates in the Fox Valley Association Conference with ten other Fox Valley schools. The school's mascot is the Galloping Ghost, named after a football game in the early days of the school. According to the legend, in 1940 a student who had cloaked him and his horse ran onto the football field to deliver a football to the referee.

=== Athletic conference affiliation history ===
- Northeastern Wisconsin Conference (1927-1952)
- Mid-Eastern Conference (1952-1970)
- Fox Valley Association (1970–present)

== Notable alumni ==
- Amari Allen, College basketball player for the Alabama Crimson Tide (attended, not graduated)
- William J. Duffy, Wisconsin jurist and legislator
- Jordan McCabe Assistant coach for the Green Bay Phoenix men's basketball team
- Lee Meyerhofer, Wisconsin legislator
- Arnold C. Otto, Wisconsin legislator
- Tobin Siebers, Co-chair of the Initiative on Disability Studies and V.L. Parrington Collegiate Professor at the University of Michigan
- Red Smith, NFL and MLB player
- David Viaene, NFL player
