= Menomonee Falls High School =

Public school in Wisconsin, United States

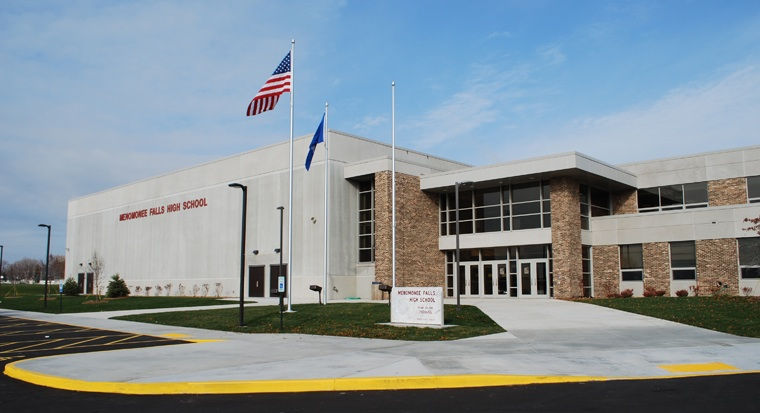

Location
- W142 N8101 Merrimac Drive; Menomonee Falls, Wisconsin 53051; United States; 43.16485°N 88.08859°W

Information
- Type: Public
- Established: 1969
- School district: Menomonee Falls School District
- Superintendent: David Munoz
- Principal: Dan Gebauer
- Staff: 77.00 (FTE)
- Grades: 9–12
- Enrollment: 1,291 (2023–2024)
- Student to teacher ratio: 16.77
- Colors: Burgundy and Gray
- Athletics conference: Greater Metro Conference
- Nickname: The Phoenix
- Newspaper: Smoke Signals
- Yearbook: Chieftain
- Website: Menomonee Falls High School website

Menomonee Falls High School is a four-year public high school located in the village of Menomonee Falls in Waukesha County, Wisconsin in the United States. It is a part of the Menomonee Falls School District.

The district (and therefore the high school's attendance boundary) covers most of Menomonee Falls, a section of Lannon, and a small section of Milwaukee in Waukesha County.

== History ==
Prior to 1969 a building on Garfield Drive was known as Menomonee Falls High School. The school colors were purple and white, the mascot was the Indians, the school newspaper was known as "The Harmony" until 1961 when it became The Chieftain, and the yearbook was The Periscope. The class of 1969 was the last graduation class from that building named as such. In 1969 when a second high school was built to serve the growing population, the original high school was renamed Menomonee Falls North and the new school was known as Menomonee Falls East. The school colors were blue and gold, Titans the mascot and the yearbook was the Javelin. The school district returned to having one high school in the 1983–84 school year, with Menomonee Falls North High School becoming Menomonee Falls North Middle School. The class of 1984 was the last class graduating from Menomonee Falls North High.

In 2010, the freshman class was returned to the high school, instead of being a part of the junior high. That same year, the village voted to update and expand the facilities. Updates included a new gym, and administration and science wings totaling 71,600 square feet.

On December 9, 2019, the Menomonee Falls School Board voted 5–2 to retire the "Indians" nickname and mascot at the conclusion of the 2019–20 school year. This was met with much controversy as the new naming selection process was deemed as unfair by many in the community.

== Academics ==
Menomonee Falls High School employs a Plan-Do-Study-Act system of data collection and use. These 45-day cycles of data help educators at the school create data reports that include progress on student behavior and assessments.

== Extracurricular activities ==
The high school mascot is the Phoenix, which recently replaced the Indians, a mascot that had been associated with secondary schools in Menomonee Falls since 1892. School colors are burgundy and gray. The high school offers 26 varsity sports and 41 extracurricular activities.

== Notable alumni ==
- Michael Andrew (1983), singer
- Mory Bamba (2019), NFL cornerback for the New York Jets
- Brett Hartmann (2005), football player who played for the Houston Texans
- Matt Henningsen (2017), football player for the Denver Broncos
- Andy Hurley (1998), musician, drummer for Fall Out Boy
- Emma Jaskaniec (2018), soccer player for Spokane Zephyr FC
- Dan Knodl (1977), politician who is a member of the Wisconsin Senate
- Bob Kronenberg, Pro Scout for the New England Patriots
- John H. Niebler (1959), politician who served as a member of the Wisconsin State Assembly
- Jessica Szohr (2002), actor, played Vanessa Abrams in The CW's Gossip Girl
- J. P. Tokoto (2012), basketball player who plays professionally in Israel
- Seth Trimble (2022), basketball player for the North Carolina Tar Heels
- Joel Whitburn (1957), author and music historian
