= Lolita Schneiders =

American politician (1931–2022)

Member of the Wisconsin State Assembly
- In office 1981–1997

Personal details
- Born: March 3, 1931 Chicago, Illinois, U.S.
- Died: November 12, 2022 (aged 91)
- Party: Republican
- Spouse: Donald (deceased)
- Children: 3 (2 deceased)
- Education: University of Wisconsin–Stevens Point (BA)

Lolita Schneiders (March 3, 1931 – November 12, 2022) was an American politician, teacher, and businesswoman who served as a member of the Wisconsin State Assembly.

== Early life and education ==
Born in Chicago, Illinois, Schneiders went to Lourdes High School and Mundelein College in Chicago. She then received her bachelor's degree in education from University of Wisconsin–Stevens Point.

== Career ==
Schneiders worked as a saleswomen, teacher, and insurance agent in Menomonee Falls, Wisconsin. She served in the Wisconsin State Assembly from 1981 until 1997 as a Republican. After leaving the Assembly, Schneiders served on the University of Wisconsin–Madison Board of Regents.

== Personal life ==
Schneiders and her husband had three children. In 2002, Schneiders' daughter was killed in a car accident near Cloverland, Vilas County, Wisconsin. Schneiders, who had been driving in the car with her husband and daughter, was injured. In 2017, Schneiders' husband, Don, died at the age of 86.

Lolita Schneiders died on November 12, 2022, at the age of 91.
