= Menomonee Falls, Wisconsin =

- Village
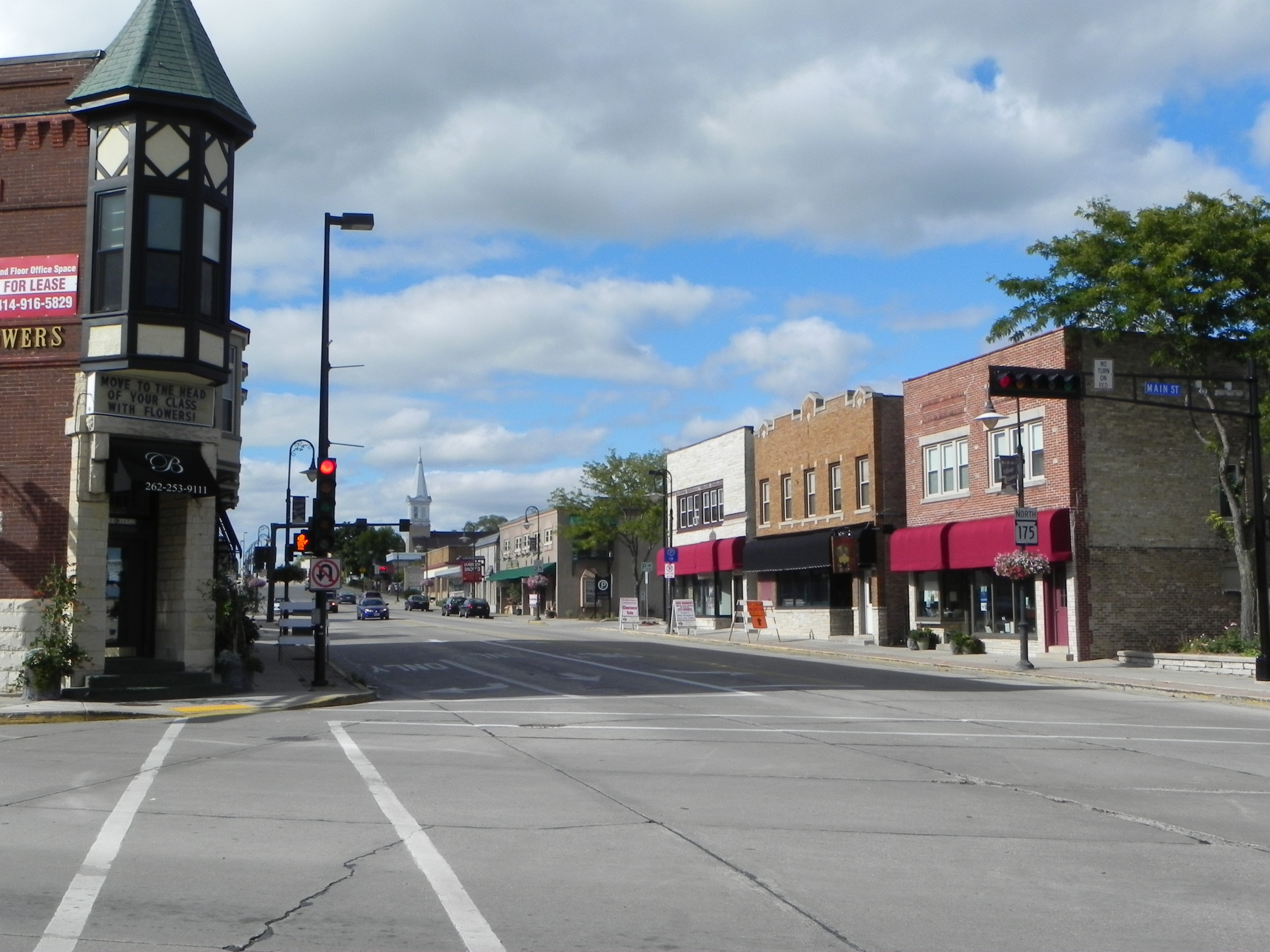
- Main Street Historic District

- Location of Menomonee Falls in Waukesha County, Wisconsin.

- Location within Wisconsin Location within the United States
- Coordinates: 43°10′44″N 88°7′2″W
- Country: United States
- State: Wisconsin
- County: Waukesha

Area
  - Total: 33.30 sq mi (86.25 km^{2})
  - Land: 32.91 sq mi (85.23 km^{2})
  - Water: 0.39 sq mi (1.02 km^{2})
- Elevation: 856 ft (261 m)

Population (2020)
  - Total: 38,527
  - Density: 1,160/sq mi (446/km^{2})
- Time zone: UTC−6 (Central (CST))
  - Summer (DST): UTC−5 (CDT)
- ZIP Codes: 53051, 53052
- Area code: 262
- FIPS code: 55-51000
- GNIS feature ID: 1569346
- Website: www.menomoneefalls.gov

Menomonee Falls (/məˈnɒməni/ mə-NOM-ə-nee) is a village in Waukesha County, Wisconsin, United States. Its population was 38,527 at the 2020 census, making it the most-populous village in Wisconsin. It is part of the Milwaukee metropolitan area. The Fortune 500 retailer Kohl's is headquartered in the village.

== History ==
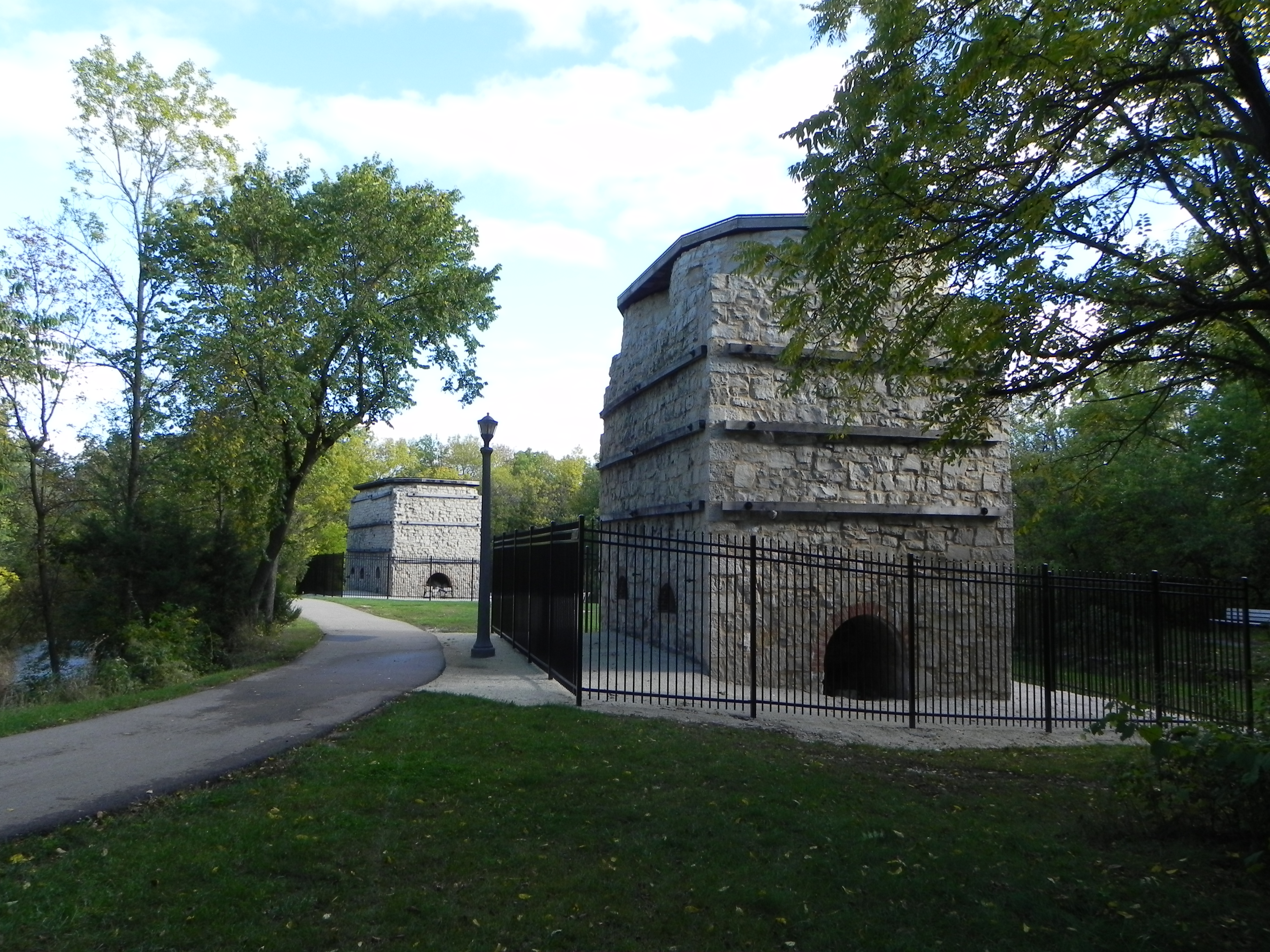
Garwin Mace Lime Kilns

The area that became Menomonee Falls was first inhabited by Native Americans, including the people of the Menominee and Chippewa tribes. The town of Menomonee was created in December 1839.

The Menomonee Falls area continued to grow throughout the 1870s. By 1890, the population of the area was 2,480. In 1892, a section of the town of Menomonee was incorporated as the village of Menomonee Falls. In 1894, the first village board was elected and the first village fire department formed. After becoming a village, many important buildings were built, including the village hall/fire station, Menomonee Falls High School, and the Wisconsin Sugar Factory. The Wisconsin Sugar Factory employed as many as 500 laborers and produced up to 15 million pounds of sugar annually.

The first public telephone service was offered in 1902; a local electricity plant offered a substitute for kerosene lamps by 1907; water mains were installed in the 1910s; and the first sewer lines were laid in 1924. New neighborhoods were developed and the Menomonee Falls Public Library was built. The village's second bank, the Farmers and Merchants Bank, was established in 1908 by attorney Samuel A. Connell. By 1910, automobiles started being sold in the village, which led to an increase in paved roads. By 1919, Highway 15 connected Menomonee Falls to Milwaukee and Illinois and, by 1922, to Green Bay.

In the early 20th century, a new municipal building was built to house village offices, the fire department, the police department, and a new Menomonee Falls Public Library. A subdivision named Hiawatha Heights added 58 single-family homes with 95% of the home buyers relocating from Milwaukee. By 1940, the population had risen to 3,674. Along with all of this, the building of shopping areas had begun, including the Hiawatha Shopping Center, which today can be seen along Appleton Avenue, with Krueger's Entertainment and Pop's Custard as the main attractions. In the 1950s, more subdivisions were built, and US 41 was completed. This increased the attractiveness of Menomonee Falls, as an easy commute to Milwaukee jobs was now possible. In 1958, the village of Menomonee Falls annexed the remainder of the Town of Menomonee, which increased the total area from 2 to 32 square miles and the population from 4,500 to 12,000.

In the 1960s, the school district built six new schools because of population growth in the baby-boom era. In 1965, a can manufacturing plant with a capacity of 150 million cans per year was established in the village, owned by Containers, Inc., a joint venture of the Miller Brewing Company and Carnation Company. "By the end of the 1960s, 48% of the population in the village was 19 years old or under." Both a better park system and better public services were developed. Several full-time police officers were hired, along with full-time firefighters. Shopping centers were developed and major employers established in the village, including Harley-Davidson and Wacker Neuson. Old structures were razed to make way for several new streets.

Near the end of the 20th century, Menomonee Falls continued to grow in population. Between 1990 and 2010, the population had grown by almost 9,000. New subdivisions and apartments were built in the community. Reports in 2016 state, "As of 2016, the Village had an estimated 36,907 residents and had become an important economic hub of Greater Milwaukee area." Major business developments include Kohl's Corporate campus and the Westbrook Corporate Center. A new village hall/municipal center was built and a new library.

== Geography ==
According to the United States Census Bureau, the village has a total area of 33.31 square miles (86.27 km^{2}), of which 0.39 square miles (1.01 km^{2}) (0.12%) is covered by water.

Fussville is a neighborhood of Menomonee Falls located at 43°09′06″N 88°04′40″W. Fussville was once a separate unincorporated community; it was annexed by Menomonee Falls sometime between 1950 and 1960.

== Demographics ==
Historical population
Census	Pop.	Note	%±
1880	366		—
1890	422		15.3%
1900	687		62.8%
1910	919		33.8%
1920	1,019		10.9%
1930	1,291		26.7%
1940	1,469		13.8%
1950	2,469		68.1%
1960	18,276		640.2%
1970	31,697		73.4%
1980	27,845		−12.2%
1990	26,840		−3.6%
2000	32,647		21.6%
2010	35,626		9.1%
2020	38,527		8.1%
2022 (est.)	39,107	▲	1.5%
U.S. Decennial Census

=== 2020 census ===
As of the 2020 census, Menomonee Falls had a population of 38,527. The median age was 43.2 years. 21.7% of residents were under the age of 18 and 20.7% of residents were 65 years of age or older. For every 100 females there were 93.5 males, and for every 100 females age 18 and over there were 90.5 males age 18 and over.

93.3% of residents lived in urban areas, while 6.7% lived in rural areas.

There were 16,271 households in Menomonee Falls, of which 27.3% had children under the age of 18 living in them. Of all households, 54.9% were married-couple households, 15.1% were households with a male householder and no spouse or partner present, and 24.9% were households with a female householder and no spouse or partner present. About 30.2% of all households were made up of individuals and 15.9% had someone living alone who was 65 years of age or older.

There were 16,923 housing units, of which 3.9% were vacant. The homeowner vacancy rate was 0.7% and the rental vacancy rate was 6.3%.

Racial composition as of the 2020 census
Race	Number	Percent
White	32,385	84.1%
Black or African American	1,450	3.8%
American Indian and Alaska Native	104	0.3%
Asian	2,358	6.1%
Native Hawaiian and Other Pacific Islander	9	0.0%
Some other race	302	0.8%
Two or more races	1,919	5.0%
Hispanic or Latino (of any race)	1,243	3.2%

=== 2010 census ===
As of the census of 2010, 35,626 people, 14,567 households, and 10,028 families resided in the village. The population density was 1,082.2 inhabitants per square mile (417.8/km^{2}). The 15,142 housing units had an average density of 460.0 per square mile (177.6/km^{2}). The racial makeup of the village was 91.6% White, 3.0% African American, 0.2% Native American, 3.5% Asian, 0.4% from other races, and 1.3% from two or more races. Hispanics or Latinos of any race were 2.0% of the population.

Of the 14,567 households, 30.5% had children under 18 living with them, 59.1% were married couples living together, 6.9% had a female householder with no husband present, 2.9% had a male householder with no wife present, and 31.2% were not families. About 26.8% of all households were made up of individuals, and 14.9% had someone living alone who was 65 or older. The average household size was 2.43 and the average family size was 2.97.

The median age in the village was 43.3 years; the age distribution was 23.0% under 18, 6% from 18 and 24, 23.5% from 25 to 44, 29.6% from 45 to 64, and 17.8% 65 or older. The gender makeup of the village was 48.2% male and 51.8% female.

== Economy ==
The overall economy of Menomonee Falls employs 18,839 people and "is specialized in Management of Companies and Enterprises; Manufacturing; and Wholesale trade". The largest industries in the village are manufacturing, healthcare/social assistance, and retail trade, which employ 3,917, 2,704 and 2,465 people, respectively. Income per capita with adults and children included is $36,386 with the median household income in Menomonee Falls being $73,350. The average male salary is $93,192 and average female salary is $61,294. The unemployment rate is 4.00% with a job growth rate of 0.73%. Sales tax is 5.1% and income tax is at 6.27%. Its poverty rate is 3.72%.

=== Top employers ===
According to Menomonee Falls's 2022 Annual Comprehensive Financial Report, the top employers in the village are:

#	Employer	Number of employees
1	Kohl's	4,000
2	Froedtert Health	3,000
3	Briggs & Stratton	1,300
4	Harley-Davidson	950
5	Menomonee Falls School District	625
5	Arandell Schmidt	625
7	Leonardo DRS	600
8	Wacker Neuson	550
9	Bradley Corporation	505
10	Alto-Shaam	500

== Parks and recreation ==
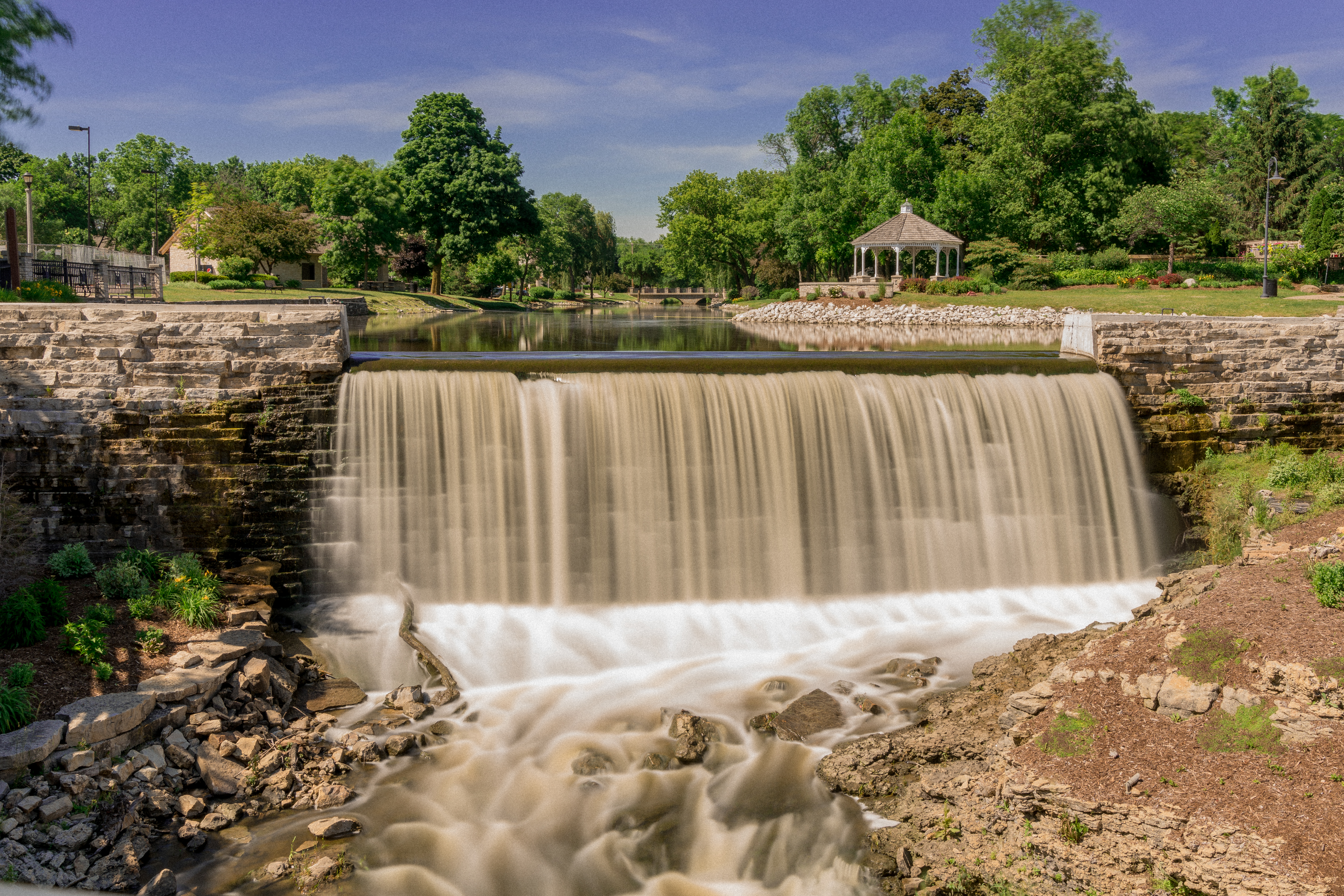
Mill Pond Park

A 150-acre, 18-hole golf course, partially completed in the mid-1960s, sits at the southwestern corner of the village.

In the mid-1950s, the village held an Annual Field Day, an annual all-village family fair, part of the village's recreation program.

== Government ==
Menomonee Falls has a governing body consisting of a board president and a six-member board of trustees. The current village board can be found here.

== Education ==
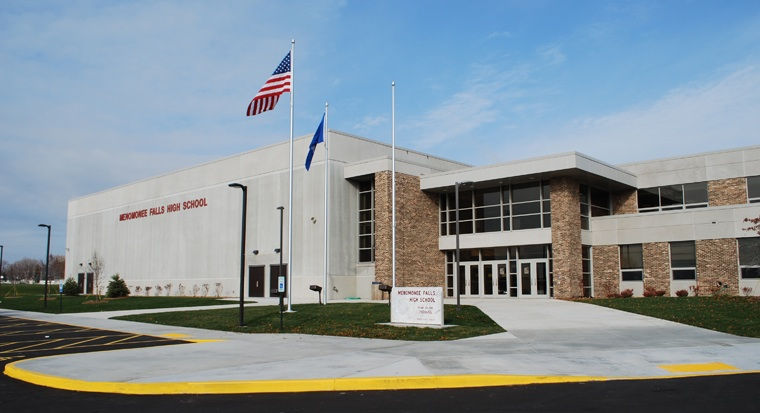
Menomonee Falls High School

Menomonee Falls School District, which covers much of Menomonee Falls, operates Menomonee Falls High School, North Middle School, Benjamin Franklin Elementary School, Riverside Elementary School, Valley View Elementary School, and Shady Lane Elementary School. Saint Mary's Catholic School, Calvary Baptist School, Grace Lutheran School, Bethlehem Lutheran School, Zion Lutheran School, and Aquinas Academy are private schools in Menomonee Falls.

Southwestern portions of Menomonee Falls lie within the Hamilton School District, which also serves all of the communities of Sussex, Lannon, and Butler, portions of Lisbon, and a small part of Pewaukee.

In 2023, $250,000 were cut from the Menomonee Falls Public Library budget and three library board members were ousted with little to no transparency to the public. Fears mounted that the board would close the library because residents are, according to Brad Jubber, the village board representative on the Library Board at the time, "affluent and can buy their own books."

== Media ==
- The Menomonee Falls Express News
- The Menomonee Falls Gazette (1971–1978) – comic strip publication
- The Menomonee Falls Guardian (1973–1976) – comic strip publication
- Menomonee Falls Now

== Infrastructure ==
As of 1967, the water supply for the village was provided by four wells, providing a daily water capacity of five million gallons.

Milwaukee County Transit System bus routes 61 and 79 serve Menomonee Falls. The Milwaukee Road had a line running between Milwaukee and North Lake, which had a station in Menomonee Falls; it was eventually abandoned.

== Notable people ==
- Josh Bilicki, NASCAR driver
- Mark Borchardt, independent filmmaker
- Mel Eslyn, film producer
- Brett Hartmann, National Football League punter
- George E. Hoyt, Wisconsin state representative and senator
- Andy Hurley, drummer of Fall Out Boy
- Emma Jaskaniec, professional soccer player
- Elmer Klumpp, Major League Baseball player
- Cree Myles, influencer, writer, and organizer
- Victor Nehs, Wisconsin state representative
- Justus Henry Nelson, Methodist missionary in the Amazon
- John H. Niebler, Wisconsin state representative
- Vic Perrin, actor
- Richard Riehle, actor
- Lolita Schneiders, Wisconsin state representative
- Barry Schultz, professional disc golfer
- James Sensenbrenner, U.S. congressman
- Mike Solwold, NFL player
- Peter J. Somers, U.S. congressman
- Jessica Szohr, actress
- Seth Trimble, basketball player
- Bob Uecker, baseball radio broadcaster
- Joel Whitburn, music historian
- Mark Wilson, five-time winner on the PGA Tour

== See also ==
- List of villages in Wisconsin
