= List of schools in the Roman Catholic Archdiocese of Milwaukee =

This is a list of schools in the Roman Catholic Archdiocese of Milwaukee.

== Colleges and universities ==
- Alverno College, Milwaukee
- Cardinal Stritch University, Milwaukee
- Marian University, Fond du Lac
- Marquette University, Milwaukee
- Mount Mary College, Milwaukee
- Sacred Heart Seminary and School of Theology, Hales Corners

=== Seminaries ===
- St. Francis de Sales Seminary, St. Francis

== High schools ==
- Burlington Catholic Central High School, Burlington
- Catholic Memorial High School, Waukesha
- Chesterton Academy of Milwaukee, Menomonee Falls
- Cristo Rey Jesuit High School, Milwaukee
- Divine Savior Holy Angels High School, Milwaukee
- Dominican High School, Whitefish Bay
- Marquette University High School, Milwaukee
- Messmer High School, Milwaukee
- Pius XI High School, Milwaukee
- St. Anthony High School, Milwaukee
- St. Catherine's High School, Racine
- St. Joan Antida High School, Milwaukee
- St. Joseph Catholic Academy, Kenosha
- St. Lawrence Seminary High School, Mt. Calvary
- St. Mary's Springs Academy, Fond du Lac
- St. Thomas More High School, Milwaukee

== Elementary schools ==
=== Dodge County ===
- Consolidated Catholic Schools, K-8, Lomira
- St.Katharine Drexel School, K-8, Beaver Dam
- St.Mary Catholic School, K-8, Mayville

=== Fond du Lac County ===
- Consolidated Parochial Elementary, K-6, Johnsburg
- Fond du Lac Area Catholic Education System (FACES), K-8, Fond du Lac
- Shepherd of the Hills, K-8, Eden
- St. Matthew School, K-8, Campbellsport

=== Kenosha County ===
- All Saints Catholic School, preK-8, Kenosha
- St. Alphonsus School, K-8, New Munster
- Holy Rosary, K-8, Kenosha
- St. Joseph Catholic Academy, 4K-12, Kenosha
- St. Mary-Kenosha, K-8, Kenosha
- Mount Carmel-St. Therese Elementary School, K-6, Kenosha
- St. Peter, K-8, Kenosha

=== Milwaukee County ===
- St. Adalbert
- St. Alphonsus
- St. Anthony
- St. Bernard
- Blessed Sacrament
- Blessed Savior-South
- Blessed Savior-East
- Blessed Savior-West
- St. Catherine
- Catholic East Elementary School, built in 1956, educates in K4-8 grades, alumnus John McGivern, actor.
- St. Charles Borromeo
- Christ King
- Divine Mercy
- St. Eugene
- St. Gregory the Great
- Holy Family
- Messmer St. Leo
- Messmer St. Rose
- Northwest Catholic
- St. John the Evangelist (not to be confused with the Cathedral of St. John the Evangelist)
- St. John Paul II
- St. Josaphat
- St. Joseph
- St. Jude the Apostle
- St. Margaret Mary
- St. Mary Parish School, Hales Corners
- Mary Queen of Saints Catholic Academy
- St. Matthew
- St. Matthias
- St. Monica
- Mother of Good Counsel
- Nativity Jesuit Middle School
- Notre Dame Middle School
- Our Lady Queen of Peace
- Prince of Peace/Principe de Paz
- St. Rafael the Archangel
- St. Robert
- St. Roman
- St. Sebastian
- St. Thomas Aquinas Academy
- St. Vincent Pallotti

=== Ozaukee County ===
- St. Francis Borgia
- St. Joseph
- Lumen Christi
- St. Mary
- Port Washington Catholic
- Rosemary School

=== Racine County ===
- Our Lady of Grace Academy
- John Paul II Academy
- St. Joseph
- St. Lucy
- St. Rita
- St. Thomas Aquinas
- St. Charles
- St. Mary's

=== Sheboygan County ===
- Christ Child Academy
- St. Dominic
- St. Elizabeth Ann Seton
- St. John the Baptist
- St. Mary
- Our Lady of the Lakes

=== Walworth County ===
- St. Andrew
- St. Francis de Sales
- St. Patrick

=== Washington County ===
- St. Boniface
- St. Frances Cabrini
- St. Gabriel
- Holy Angels
- Holy Trinity
- St. Kilian
- St. Peter

=== Waukesha County ===
- St. Agnes
- St. Anthony
- St. Anthony near the Lake
- St. Bruno
- St. Charles
- St. Dominic
- Holy Apostles
- St. James's
- St. Jerome's
- St. Joan of Arc
- St. John Vianney
- St. Joseph's-Big Bend
- St. Joseph's-WC (Waukesha Catholic)
- St. Leonard
- St. Luke
- St. Mary's Visitation
- St. Mary's-Menomonee Falls
- St. Mary's-WC
- St. Paul's
- Queen of Apostles School, K-8, Pewaukee
- St. William's-WC
