= Wisconsin Independent Football Association =

Wisconsin high school football conference (1995-1998)

The Wisconsin Independent Football Association is a former high school football conference made up of private high schools in the state of Wisconsin. Founded in 1995 and ended after the 1998 football season, the conference's member schools were affiliated with the Wisconsin Independent Schools Athletic Association.

== History ==
The Wisconsin Independent Football Association was founded in 1995 by the twenty-six football-playing members of three conferences: the Fox Valley Christian Conference, Metro Conference and Midwest Classic Conference. When the original announcement of the conference's formation was made in 1994, the schools were aligned into four divisions largely based on their previous affiliations, with the move of St. Catherine's and St. Joseph out of the Metro Conference to join the WIFA Midwest Division with three former Midwest Classic schools (Luther Prep, Martin Luther and Winnebago Lutheran) and longtime independent Edgewood:

Fox Valley Christian	Metro	WIFA Classic	WIFA Midwest
Fox Valley Lutheran	Catholic Memorial	Burlington Catholic Central	Edgewood
Lourdes	Dominican	Holy Name Seminary	Luther Prep
Manitowoc Lutheran	Marquette University	Northwestern M&NA	Martin Luther
Roncalli	Milwaukee Lutheran	Racine Lutheran	St. Catherine's
St. Mary's Springs	Pius XI	St. John's Military Academy	St. Joseph
Xavier	Thomas More	St. Mary Catholic	Winnebago Lutheran
		University School	
		Wayland Academy	

Two of the schools announced as inaugural members didn't make it to see the conference come to fruition: Holy Name Seminary was closed by the Madison diocese and Northwestern Military and Naval Academy in Lake Geneva was merged with St. John's Military Academy in Delafield. This alignment was maintained for two seasons, until the Fox Valley Christian Conference dropped sponsorship of football and the Metro Conference ceased operations altogether following the 1996 season. The seven remaining members (Burlington Catholic Central, Lourdes Academy, Racine Lutheran, St. John's Northwestern, St. Mary Catholic, University School of Milwaukee and Wayland Academy) carried on under the WIFA Classic banner until its disbanding after the 1998 football season.

== Conference membership history ==
School	Location	Affiliation	Mascot	Colors	Seasons	Primary Conference
Catholic Central	Burlington, WI	Private (Catholic)	Hilltoppers		1995–1998	Midwest Classic
Catholic Memorial	Waukesha, WI	Private (Catholic)	Crusaders		1995–1996	Metro
Dominican	Whitefish Bay, WI	Private (Catholic, Sinsinawa Dominicans)	Knights		1995–1996	Metro
Edgewood	Madison, WI	Private (Catholic)	Crusaders		1995–1996	Independent
Fox Valley Lutheran	Appleton, WI	Private (Lutheran, WELS)	Foxes		1995–1996	Fox Valley Christian
Lourdes Academy	Oshkosh, WI	Private (Catholic)	Knights		1996–1998	Fox Valley Christian
Luther Prep	Watertown, WI	Private (Lutheran, WELS)	Phoenix		1995–1996	Midwest Classic
Manitowoc Lutheran	Manitowoc, WI	Private (Lutheran, WELS)	Lancers		1995–1996	Fox Valley Christian
Marquette University	Milwaukee, WI	Private (Catholic, Jesuit)	Hilltoppers		1995–1996	Metro
Martin Luther	Greendale, WI	Private (Lutheran, LCMS)	Spartans		1995–1996	Midwest Classic
Milwaukee Lutheran	Milwaukee, WI	Private (Lutheran, LCMS)	Red Knights		1995–1996	Metro
Pius XI	Milwaukee, WI	Private (Catholic)	Popes		1995–1996	Metro
Racine Lutheran	Racine, WI	Private (Lutheran, LCMS)	Crusaders		1995–1998	Midwest Classic
Roncalli	Manitowoc, WI	Private (Catholic)	Jets		1995–1996	Fox Valley Christian
St. Catherine's	Racine, WI	Private (Catholic, Dominican)	Angels		1995–1996	Metro
St. John's Northwestern	Delafield, WI	Private (Nonsectarian), Military	Lancers		1995–1998	Midwest Classic
St. Joseph	Kenosha, WI	Private (Catholic)	Lancers		1995–1996	Metro
St. Mary Catholic	Neenah, WI	Private (Catholic)	Zephyrs		1995–1998	Fox Valley Christian
St. Mary's Springs	Fond du Lac, WI	Private (Catholic)	Ledgers		1995–1996	Fox Valley Christian
Thomas More	Milwaukee, WI	Private (Catholic)	Cavaliers		1995–1996	Metro
University School	River Hills, WI	Private (Nonsectarian)	Wildcats		1995–1998	Midwest Classic
Wayland Academy	Beaver Dam, WI	Private (Nonsectarian, historically Baptist)	Big Red		1995–1998	Midwest Classic
Winnebago Lutheran	Fond du Lac, WI	Private (Lutheran, WELS)	Vikings		1995–1996	Midwest Classic
Xavier	Appleton, WI	Private (Catholic)	Hawks		1995–1996	Fox Valley Christian

== Membership timeline ==
Fox Valley Christian Metro WIFA Classic WIFA Midwest

== List of state champions ==
School	Year	Organization	Division
St. Mary's Springs	1995	WISAA	Division 1
Catholic Memorial	1996	WISAA	Division 1
Roncalli	1996	WISAA	Division 2

== List of conference champions ==
=== Fox Valley Christian Conference ===
School	Quantity	Years
St. Mary's Springs	2	1995, 1996
Fox Valley Lutheran	0	
Lourdes Academy	0	
Manitowoc Lutheran	0	
Roncalli	0	
Xavier	0	

=== Metro Conference ===
School	Quantity	Years
Marquette University	2	1995, 1996
Catholic Memorial	1	1996
Dominican	0	
Milwaukee Lutheran	0	
Pius XI	0	
Thomas More	0	

=== WIFA Classic Division ===
School	Quantity	Years
Catholic Central	2	1995, 1997
Racine Lutheran	2	1995, 1996
University School	1	1998
Lourdes Academy	0	
St. John's Northwestern	0	
St. Mary Catholic	0	
Wayland Academy	0	

=== WIFA Midwest Division ===
School	Quantity	Years
Luther Prep	2	1995, 1996
Edgewood	1	1995
St. Joseph	1	1995
Martin Luther	0	
St. Catherine's	0	
Winnebago Lutheran	0	
