= Milwaukee Catholic Conference =

Wisconsin high school athletic conference (1930-1974)

The Milwaukee Catholic Conference is a former high school athletic conference in Wisconsin, United States. Consisting entirely of Catholic high schools within the Milwaukee archdiocese, the conference existed from 1930 to 1974 and all of its member schools were part of the Wisconsin Catholic Interscholastic Athletic Association and its successor, the Wisconsin Independent Schools Athletic Association.

== History ==
=== 1930–1960 ===
Location of Original Milwaukee Catholic Conference Members

The Milwaukee Catholic Conference was formed in 1930 by six parochial high schools in the Greater Milwaukee area. Three members were located in Milwaukee (Marquette University, Messmer, St. John's Cathedral) along with Pio Nono in St. Francis, St. Bonaventure in Sturtevant and St. Catherine's in Racine. St. Mary's High School in Burlington joined the conference in 1932, but their stay would be brief as they left two years later to compete as an independent. Membership in the Milwaukee Catholic Conference was brought back up to seven schools in 1935 when St. Stanislaus (later Notre Dame) joined the loop. St. Bonaventure left the conference in 1937 before rejoining in 1940. Along with newcomers St. Benedict the Moor, membership in the Milwaukee Catholic Conference increased to eight schools. In 1941, Pio Nono High School became St. Francis Minor Seminary and inherited their place in the conference. The recently opened Pius XI High School joined the Milwaukee Catholic Conference in 1942, taking the place of St. Bonaventure, who left the conference for a second time due to wartime-related transportation issues. They returned to the conference after the completion of World War II, along with Don Bosco High School in 1947. St. Benedict and St. Francis Minor Seminary left the conference in 1948, leaving eight schools in the circuit. Catholic Memorial High School in Waukesha opened in 1952 and joined the Milwaukee Catholic Conference that same year. Membership increased to eleven when two newly opened schools, Dominican High School in Whitefish Bay and St. Joseph High School in Kenosha joined in 1958, and twelve in 1959 when St. Benedict the Moor rejoined.

=== 1960–1974 ===
Location of Milwaukee Catholic Conference Members (1960-1962)
Location of Final Milwaukee Catholic Conference Members

In 1960, the Milwaukee Catholic Conference split into two divisions of six schools each, the White Division for larger schools and the Gold Division for smaller schools:

Gold Division	White Division
Catholic Memorial	Don Bosco
Dominican	Marquette University
Notre Dame	Messmer
St. Benedict	Pius XI
St. Bonaventure	St. Catherine's
St. John's Cathedral	St. Joseph

This alignment would stay in place for two years, when the conference went back to a single division. This was due in part to the addition of a thirteenth member (the newly opened Francis Jordan High School) and the growth of Catholic Memorial and Dominican beyond the small school enrollment threshold. This number turned out to be a high water mark as Catholic high schools in the Milwaukee archdiocese began to close or consolidate in the mid-1960s. The first casualty was St. Benedict the Moor High School, which closed in 1964 to make room for the construction of Interstate Highway 43 through the north side of downtown Milwaukee. Pio Nono was reopened as a high school in 1965 and made its return to the conference in 1968, offsetting the loss of Francis Jordan High School, which closed in 1969 due to lack of adequate facilities. In 1972, Don Bosco and Pio Nono would merge to form St. Thomas More High School on the south side of Milwaukee. Membership would decrease to its final figure of nine schools when Notre Dame and St. Bonaventure, the two smallest schools in the conference, left to become charter members of the Classic Conference in 1973. The end of the Milwaukee Catholic Conference would come in 1974, when Milwaukee Lutheran High School left the Midwest Prep Conference and became the first non-Catholic high school admitted into the group. The league's name was changed to the Metro Conference and continued competition until the dissolution of the WISAA in 1997.

== Conference membership history ==
=== Final members ===
School	Location	Affiliation	Mascot	Colors	Joined	Left	Conference Joined	Current Conference
Catholic Memorial	Waukesha, WI	Private (Catholic)	Crusaders		1952	1974	Metro	Classic 8
Dominican	Whitefish Bay, WI	Private (Catholic, Sinsinawa Dominicans)	Knights		1958	1974	Metro	Metro Classic
Marquette University	Milwaukee, WI	Private (Catholic, Jesuit)	Hilltoppers		1930	1974	Metro	Greater Metro
Messmer	Milwaukee, WI	Private (Catholic)	Bishops		1930	1974	Metro	Midwest Classic
Pius XI	Milwaukee, WI	Private (Catholic)	Popes		1942	1974	Metro	Woodland
St. Catherine's	Racine, WI	Private (Catholic, Dominican)	Angels		1930	1974	Metro	Metro Classic
St. John's Cathedral	Milwaukee, WI	Private (Catholic)	Eagles		1930	1974	Metro	Closed in 1976
St. Joseph	Kenosha, WI	Private (Catholic)	Lancers		1958	1974	Metro	Metro Classic
Thomas More	Milwaukee, WI	Private (Catholic)	Cavaliers		1972	1974	Metro	Metro Classic

=== Previous members ===
School	Location	Affiliation	Mascot	Colors	Joined	Left	Conference Joined	Current Conference
Don Bosco	Milwaukee, WI	Private (Catholic)	Dons		1947	1972	Merged into Thomas More (1972)	
Francis Jordan	Milwaukee, WI	Private (Catholic)	Cardinals		1962	1969	Closed in 1969	
Notre Dame	Milwaukee, WI	Private (Catholic, School Sisters of Notre Dame)	Redwings		1935	1973	Classic	Closed in 1988
Pio Nono	St. Francis, WI	Private (Catholic)	Spartans		1930, 1968	1941, 1972	Became St. Francis Minor Seminary (1941), merged into Thomas More (1972)	
St. Benedict the Moor	Milwaukee, WI	Private (Catholic, Capuchin)	Brown Bombers, Pacers		1940, 1959	1948, 1964	Independent (1948), closed in 1964	
St. Bonaventure	Sturtevant, WI	Private (Catholic, Franciscan)	Cardinals		1930, 1940, 1946	1937, 1942, 1973	Independent (1937), Independent (1942), Classic (1973)	Closed in 1983
St. Francis Minor Seminary	St. Francis, WI	Private (Catholic)	Maroons		1941	1948	Discontinued athletics in 1948	
St. Mary's	Burlington, WI	Private (Catholic)	Hilltoppers		1932	1934	Independent	Midwest Classic

== Membership timeline ==
=== Full members ===
Gold Division White Division

=== Football members ===
Gold Division White Division

== List of state champions ==
=== Fall sports ===
Boys Cross Country
School	Year	Organization	Division
Pius XI	1967	WCIAA	
St. Catherine's	1968	WISAA	Class A
St. Catherine's	1969	WISAA	Class A
St. Catherine's	1970	WISAA	Class A
St. Catherine's	1971	WISAA	Class A
Pius XI	1972	WISAA	Class A
Thomas More	1973	WISAA	Class A

Football
School	Year	Organization
Pius XI	1972	WISAA

Volleyball
School	Year	Organization
Dominican	1973	WISAA

=== Winter sports ===
Boys Basketball
School	Year	Organization
St. Catherine's	1958	WCIAA
St. Catherine's	1959	WCIAA
St. Catherine's	1961	WCIAA
Marquette University	1965	WCIAA
Messmer	1966	WCIAA
Marquette University	1967	WCIAA
Messmer	1968	WCIAA
St. Catherine's	1969	WISAA
Pius XI	1970	WISAA
St. Catherine's	1971	WISAA
Marquette University	1972	WISAA
Marquette University	1973	WISAA
Dominican	1974	WISAA

Wrestling
School	Year	Organization
St. Catherine's	1957	WCIAA
Don Bosco	1958	WCIAA
Catholic Memorial	1959	WCIAA
Catholic Memorial	1960	WCIAA
St. Joseph	1961	WCIAA
St. Joseph	1962	WCIAA
St. Joseph	1963	WCIAA
St. Joseph	1964	WCIAA
St. Joseph	1965	WCIAA
St. Joseph	1966	WCIAA
Pius XI	1969	WISAA
St. Catherine's	1970	WISAA
Pius XI	1971	WISAA
Pio Nono	1972	WISAA
Thomas More	1974	WISAA

=== Spring sports ===
Baseball
School	Year	Organization
Notre Dame	1957	WCIAA
Marquette University	1959	WCIAA
Marquette University	1962	WCIAA
Pius XI	1963	WCIAA
Pius XI	1964	WCIAA
St. Joseph	1965	WCIAA
St. Catherine's	1968	WCIAA
St. Joseph	1970	WISAA
St. Catherine's	1971	WISAA
St. Catherine's	1972	WISAA
St. Catherine's	1973	WISAA

Golf
School	Year	Organization
Marquette University	1958	WCIAA
St. Catherine's	1960	WCIAA
St. Catherine's	1961	WCIAA
Don Bosco	1962	WCIAA
Marquette University	1963	WCIAA
Marquette University	1964	WCIAA
Marquette University	1965	WCIAA
Marquette University	1966	WCIAA
St. Joseph	1967	WCIAA
Pius XI	1968	WCIAA
St. Joseph	1972	WISAA

Boys Tennis
School	Year	Organization
Catholic Memorial	1960	WCIAA
Catholic Memorial	1961	WCIAA
Catholic Memorial	1962	WCIAA
Catholic Memorial	1963	WCIAA
Catholic Memorial	1964	WCIAA
Marquette University	1965	WCIAA
Marquette University	1966	WCIAA
Marquette University	1967	WCIAA

Boys Track & Field
School	Year	Organization	Division
Marquette University	1957	WCIAA	
Marquette University	1958	WCIAA	
Pius XI	1959	WCIAA	
Pius XI	1960	WCIAA	
Pius XI	1961	WCIAA	
Marquette University	1962	WCIAA	
Marquette University	1963	WCIAA	
Marquette University	1965	WCIAA	Class A
Messmer	1966	WCIAA	Class A
Pius XI	1967	WCIAA	Class A
Messmer	1968	WCIAA	Class A
Pius XI	1970	WISAA	Class A
Pius XI	1971	WISAA	Class A
Pius XI	1972	WISAA	Class A
Marquette University	1973	WISAA	Class A
Pius XI	1974	WISAA	Class A

== List of conference champions ==
=== Boys Basketball ===
School	Quantity	Years
Marquette University	16	1937, 1938, 1939, 1941, 1942, 1943, 1944, 1945, 1948, 1951, 1954, 1959, 1965, 1967, 1972, 1973
St. Catherine's	12	1931, 1933, 1935, 1951, 1958, 1959, 1960, 1961, 1966, 1969, 1971, 1974
Messmer	11	1939, 1940, 1944, 1946, 1947, 1948, 1950, 1964, 1965, 1966, 1968
Pius XI	7	1957, 1962, 1963, 1965, 1966, 1967, 1973
Don Bosco	6	1952, 1953, 1955, 1956, 1968, 1970
St. John's Cathedral	5	1932, 1933, 1934, 1936, 1944
Notre Dame	3	1948, 1949, 1962
Pio Nono	2	1932, 1937
Catholic Memorial	1	1961
Dominican	0	
Francis Jordan	0	
St. Benedict the Moor	0	
St. Bonaventure	0	
St. Francis Minor Seminary	0	
St. Joseph	0	
St. Mary's	0	
Thomas More	0	

=== Football ===
School	Quantity	Years
Marquette University	14	1936, 1938, 1940, 1941, 1942, 1944, 1950, 1951, 1952, 1954, 1959, 1960, 1963, 1973
St. Catherine's	13	1931, 1932, 1933, 1934, 1943, 1945, 1946, 1948, 1949, 1953, 1955, 1956, 1957
Don Bosco	8	1953, 1954, 1961, 1964, 1965, 1966, 1967, 1970
Pius XI	6	1954, 1958, 1962, 1964, 1968, 1969
Catholic Memorial	4	1960, 1961, 1971, 1972
St. John's Cathedral	3	1934, 1937, 1939
Pio Nono	2	1935, 1936
Messmer	1	1947
Thomas More	1	1973
Dominican	0	
Francis Jordan	0	
Notre Dame	0	
St. Benedict the Moor	0	
St. Francis Minor Seminary	0	
St. Joseph	0	
