= Midwest Classic Conference (Wisconsin) =

Wisconsin high school athletic conference

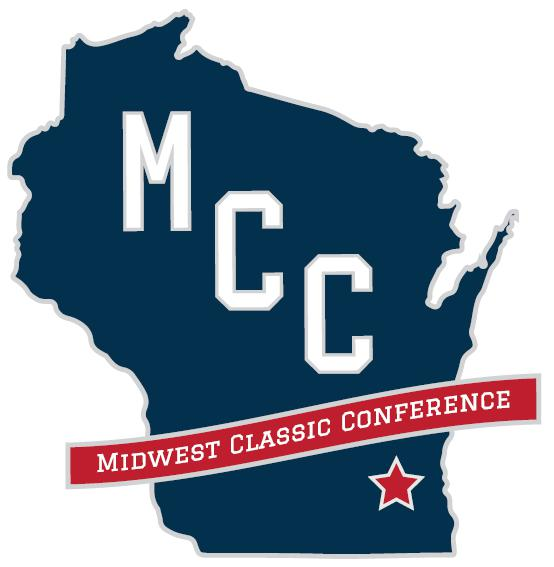

The Midwest Classic Conference is a high school athletic conference made up primarily of private high schools in southeastern Wisconsin. Founded in 1983, all of its member schools belong to the Wisconsin Interscholastic Athletic Association.

== History ==
=== 1983-1997 ===
Location of Original Midwest Classic Conference Members

The Midwest Classic Conference was formed in 1983 out of the merger between two previously established conferences in the Wisconsin Independent Schools Athletic Association. Seven schools came from the Midwest Prep Conference (Martin Luther, Northwestern Prep, Racine Lutheran, St. John's Military Academy, St. Mary's, University School of Milwaukee and Wayland Academy) while the other nine came from the Classic Conference (Central Wisconsin Christian, Kettle Moraine Lutheran, Notre Dame, Sheboygan Christian, Sheboygan Lutheran, Shoreland Lutheran, St. Lawrence Seminary, The Prairie School and Winnebago Lutheran). This was done in part to cut transportation costs and create for opportunities for girls in interscholastic athletics. Football was one of the initial sports sponsored, and all former Midwest Prep Conference members participated along with St. Lawrence Seminary and Winnebago Lutheran Academy. The latter two schools previously competed as associate members for football in other conferences due to the Classic Conference's lack of sponsorship of the sport. For the first few seasons of the conference, they were organized into two eight-member divisions:

Northern Division	Southern Division
Central Wisconsin Christian	Martin Luther
Kettle Moraine Lutheran	Notre Dame
Northwestern Prep	Racine Lutheran
Sheboygan Christian	Shoreland Lutheran
Sheboygan Lutheran	St. John's Military Academy
St. Lawrence Seminary	St. Mary's
Wayland Academy	The Prairie School
Winnebago Lutheran	University School

The first change to conference membership came in 1988, when Notre Dame High School in Milwaukee closed its doors after the end of the school year. They were replaced in 1989 by Heritage Christian School and St. Joan Antida (both in Milwaukee), and they took Notre Dame's place in the Southern Division. In 1993, Messmer joined the Midwest Classic Conference's Southern Division after working their way back from near oblivion a decade earlier. University School moved to the Northern Division to accommodate this move. Wayland Academy left the Midwest Classic to join the Indian Trails Conference as a full member in 1994, and in 1995, Northwestern Prep was merged with Martin Luther Prep in Prairie du Chien by the Wisconsin Evangelical Lutheran Synod. Their successor school, Luther Prep, took Northwestern Prep's place in the conference's Northern Division. The Midwest Classic Conference also suspended football sponsorship that year, with all members joining the new Wisconsin Independent Football Association. The conference subdivided into three divisions in 1996 when Brookfield Academy joined and Wayland Academy returned as a full member:

Central Division	Northern Division	Southern Division
Luther Prep	Brookfield Academy	Catholic Central
Kettle Moraine Lutheran	Central Wisconsin Christian	Heritage Christian
Martin Luther	Sheboygan Christian	Shoreland Lutheran
Messmer	Sheboygan Lutheran	St. John's Northwestern
Racine Lutheran	St. Lawrence Seminary	The Prairie School
Winnebago Lutheran	Wayland Academy	University School

=== 1997-2005 ===
In 1997, WISAA approved a merger with the Wisconsin Interscholastic Athletic Association that would be finalized in time for the 2000-01 school year. This led to some changes in conference membership, as schools could more easily join with established WIAA conferences within their geographic footprint and enrollment size. Martin Luther was the first school to leave the conference post-merger, and they joined the Parkland Conference in 1997. The next year, two more Midwest Classic schools followed Martin Luther into the Parkland: Kettle Moraine Lutheran and Luther Prep. To replace the four schools lost to realignment, three schools joined the Midwest Classic in 1998: Lourdes Academy in Oshkosh, NEW Lutheran in Green Bay and St. Mary Catholic in Neenah. Football sponsorship was also reinstated with the collapse of WIFA after the 1998 season. The three Fox Valley schools would only stay for a single season, as all left the conference along with five others in the region (Central Wisconsin Christian, Sheboygan Christian, Sheboygan Lutheran, St. Lawrence Seminary and Winnebago Lutheran) in 1999. This exodus left an eleven-member conference spread out over two divisions with a more concentrated catchment in southeastern Wisconsin:

Northern Division	Southern Division
Brookfield Academy	Catholic Central
Heritage Christian	Racine Lutheran
Messmer	Shoreland Lutheran
University School	St. Joan Antida
Wayland Academy	St. John's Northwestern
	The Prairie School

This alignment lasted for four years before Martin Luther rejoined the conference in 2003, and the Midwest Classic competed as a single-division conference for the first time in its history. They would keep this alignment for two years before adding three schools in 2005: Christian Life in Kenosha, Lake Country Lutheran in Hartland and Living Word Lutheran in Jackson. The conference subdivided into Classic and Midwest Divisions with this expansion:

Classic Division	Midwest Division
Catholic Central	Brookfield Academy
Heritage Christian	Christian Life
Martin Luther	Lake Country Lutheran
Messmer	Living Word Lutheran
Shoreland Lutheran	Racine Lutheran
The Prairie School	St. Joan Antida
University School	St. John's Northwestern
	Wayland Academy

=== 2005-2012 ===
Dominican joined the Midwest Classic Conference in 2006 after the Parkland Conference ceased operations. They joined the Classic Division to bring membership to sixteen schools in two eight-member divisions. Heritage Christian changed divisions the following year before more schools were added to the conference before the 2008-09 school year. St. Catherine's in Racine and St. Joseph in Kenosha joined after the demise of the Lakeshore Conference, and HOPE Christian in Milwaukee joined after competing as an independent in their formative years. The conference changed their alignment again to accommodate these additions, and with a few minor adjustments this alignment lasted for two years:

Central Division	North Division	South Division
Catholic Central	Heritage Christian	Brookfield Academy
Dominican	Lake Country Lutheran	Christian Life
Messmer	Living Word Lutheran	HOPE Christian
Shoreland Lutheran	St. Joan Antida	Martin Luther
St. Catherine's	St. John's Northwestern	Racine Lutheran
St. Joseph	University School	The Prairie School
	Wayland Academy	

The Midwest Classic Conference returned to a two-division alignment in 2010, eliminating the Central Division and dispersing its schools to the North and South Divisions:

North Division	South Division
Brookfield Academy	Catholic Central
Christian Life	Dominican
Heritage Christian	Martin Luther
HOPE Christian	Messmer
Lake Country Lutheran	Racine Lutheran
Living Word Lutheran	Shoreland Lutheran
St. Joan Antida	St. Catherine's
St. John's Northwestern	St. Joseph
University School	The Prairie School
Wayland Academy	

For the 2011-2012 school year, Dominican and Messmer of the South Division swapped divisional affiliations with Christian Life and Heritage Christian of the North Division.

=== 2012-present ===
In 2012, eight schools left the Midwest Classic Conference: Catholic Central, Dominican, Martin Luther, Racine Lutheran, Shoreland Lutheran, St. Catherine's, St. Joseph and The Prairie School. These eight schools, along with Thomas More of the Woodland Conference, formed the Metro Classic Conference, named so because several of its members were part of the old Metro Conference in WISAA before its breakup. The eleven remaining schools began competition as a single division, an alignment they currently maintain. Wayland Academy left the Midwest Classic for membership in the Trailways Conference in 2014, and were replaced by the conference's first (and to date, only) public school member: St. Francis High School. St. Joan Antida also left the Midwest Classic in 2014 to compete as an independent before joining the new Lake City Conference in 2022. That same year, HOPE Christian left the conference when it eliminated high school grades from its curriculum. These schools were replaced in 2023 by one newcomer and two returning members. Kingdom Prep Lutheran in Wauwatosa made its Midwest Classic debut, and Catholic Central and Luther Prep rejoined from the Metro Classic Conference and Capitol Conference, respectively.

=== Football (since 2020) ===
In February 2019, the WIAA and the Wisconsin Football Coaches Association released a major football-only realignment for Wisconsin's high schools, starting with the 2020 football season and run on a two-year cycle. The Midwest Classic Conference received a significant overhaul, retaining only four members (Brookfield Academy, Christian Life, HOPE Christian and Living Word Lutheran) and losing three to the Metro Classic Conference's football group (Lake Country Lutheran, St. Francis and University School) along with St. John's Northwestern to the Trailways Conference. The exiting schools were replaced by four schools affiliated with the Metro Classic Conference (Catholic Central, Dominican, Racine Lutheran and St. Joseph). St. Francis rejoined the Midwest Classic for the 2022-2023 realignment cycle due to the closing of HOPE Christian Academy the year before. For the 2024-2025 competition cycle, the Midwest Classic Conference expanded to twelve schools over two divisions grouped by enrollment size. Four new members were added to the conference: Cudahy (Woodland), Kingdom Prep Lutheran (new program), Milwaukee Academy of Science (new program) and Pius XI (Parkland). All of the new schools were placed in the Large Schools division along with returning members Racine Lutheran and St. Francis, with the other six members (Brookfield Academy, Catholic Central, Christian Life, Dominican, Living Word Lutheran and St. Joseph) comprising the Small Schools division. University School is set to rejoin the Midwest Classic for the 2026-2027 cycle, and they will be entering the conference's Large Schools division with Racine Lutheran shifting to the Small Schools division.

== List of member schools ==
=== Current full members ===
School	Location	Affiliation	Enrollment	Mascot	Colors	Joined
Brookfield Academy	Brookfield, WI	Private (Nonsectarian)	319	Blue Knights		1996
Catholic Central	Burlington, WI	Private (Catholic)	108	Hilltoppers		1983, 2023
Christian Life	Kenosha, WI	Private (Interdenominational)	194	Eagles		2005
Heritage Christian	New Berlin, WI	Private (Non-denominational)	219	Patriots		1989
Kingdom Prep Lutheran	Wauwatosa, WI	Private (Lutheran, WELS)	172 (Boys only)	Wolfpack		2023
Lake Country Lutheran	Hartland, WI	Private (Lutheran, LCMS)	369	Lightning		2005
Living Word Lutheran	Jackson, WI	Private (Lutheran, LCMS)	302	Timberwolves		2005
Luther Prep	Watertown, WI	Private (Lutheran, WELS)	392	Phoenix		1995, 2023
Messmer	Milwaukee, WI	Private (Catholic)	520	Bishops		1993
St. Francis	St. Francis, WI	Public	505	Mariners		2014
St. John's Northwestern	Delafield, WI	Private (Military)	187	Lancers		1983
University School	River Hills, WI	Private (Nonsectarian)	390	Wildcats		1983

=== Current associate members ===
School	Location	Affiliation	Mascot	Colors	Primary Conference	Sport(s)
Cudahy	Cudahy, WI	Public	Packers		Woodland	Football
Milwaukee Academy of Science	Milwaukee, WI	Charter	Novas		Independent	Football
Pius XI	Milwaukee, WI	Private (Catholic)	Popes		Metro Classic	Football
Racine Lutheran	Racine, WI	Private (LCMS)	Crusaders		Metro Classic	Football
St. Joseph	Kenosha, WI	Private (Catholic)	Lancers		Metro Classic	Football

=== Former members ===
School	Location	Affiliation	Mascot	Colors	Joined	Left	Conference Joined	Current Conference
Central Wisconsin Christian	Waupun, WI	Private (Reformed)	Crusaders		1983	1999	Flyway	Trailways
Dominican	Whitefish Bay, WI	Private (Catholic, Sinsinawa Dominicans)	Knights		2006	2012	Metro Classic	
HOPE Christian	Milwaukee, WI	Private (Christian)	Hawks		2008	2022	Closed in 2022	
Kettle Moraine Lutheran	Jackson, WI	Private (WELS)	Chargers		1983	1998	Parkland	Glacier Trails
Lourdes Academy	Oshkosh, WI	Private (Catholic)	Knights		1998	1999	Independent	Trailways
Martin Luther	Greendale, WI	Private (LCMS)	Spartans		1983, 2003	1997, 2012	Parkland, Metro Classic	Metro Classic
N.E.W. Lutheran	Green Bay, WI	Private (LCMS)	Blazers		1998	1999	Packerland	
Northwestern Prep	Watertown, WI	Private (WELS)	Hornets		1983	1995	Merged with Martin Luther Prep	
Notre Dame	Milwaukee, WI	Private (Catholic)	Redwings		1983	1988	Closed in 1988	
Racine Lutheran	Racine, WI	Private (LCMS)	Crusaders		1983	2012	Metro Classic	
Sheboygan Christian	Sheboygan, WI	Private (Christian)	Eagles		1983	1999	Central Lakeshore	Big East
Sheboygan Lutheran	Sheboygan, WI	Private (LCMS)	Crusaders		1983	1999	Central Lakeshore	Big East
Shoreland Lutheran	Somers, WI	Private (WELS)	Pacers		1983	2012	Metro Classic	
St. Catherine's	Racine, WI	Private (Catholic, Racine Dominicans)	Angels		2008	2012	Metro Classic	
St. Joan Antida	Milwaukee, WI	Private (Catholic)	Jaguars		1989	2014	Independent	Lake City
St. Joseph	Kenosha, WI	Private (Catholic)	Lancers		2008	2012	Metro Classic	
St. Lawrence Seminary	Mount Calvary, WI	Private (Catholic, Capuchin)	Hilltoppers		1983	1999	Flyway	Wisconsin Flyway
St. Mary Catholic	Neenah, WI	Private (Catholic)	Zephyrs		1998	1999	Olympian	Big East
The Prairie School	Wind Point, WI	Private (Nonsectarian)	Hawks		1983	2012	Metro Classic	
Wayland Academy	Beaver Dam, WI	Private (historically Baptist)	Big Red		1983, 1996	1994, 2014	Indian Trails, Trailways	Trailways
Winnebago Lutheran	Fond du Lac, WI	Private (WELS)	Vikings		1983	1999	Flyway	Wisconsin Flyway

=== Former football-only members ===
School	Location	Affiliation	Mascot	Colors	Seasons	Primary Conference
Catholic Central	Burlington, WI	Private (Catholic)	Hilltoppers		2020-2022	Metro Classic
Dominican	Whitefish Bay, WI	Private (Catholic)	Knights		2020-2024	Metro Classic
Holy Name Seminary	Madison, WI	Private (Catholic)	Hilanders		1994	State Line
Shorewood/ Messmer	Shorewood, WI	Public, Private (Catholic)	Greyhounds		2009-2013	Woodland, Metro Classic

== Membership timeline ==
=== Full members ===
Northern Division Southern Division Central Division Classic Division Midwest Division

=== Football members ===
North Division South Division Large Schools Small Schools

== Membership map ==
Midwest Classic Conference
Location of Midwest Classic Conference full members:
1 Brookfield Academy
2 Catholic Central
3 Christian Life
4 Heritage Christian
5 Kingdom Prep Lutheran
6 Lake Country Lutheran
7 Living Word Lutheran
8 Luther Prep
9 Messmer
10 St. Francis
11 St. John's Northwestern
12 University School

== Sanctioned sports ==
	Baseball	Boys Basketball	Girls Basketball	Boys Cross Country	Girls Cross Country	Football	Boys Golf	Boys Soccer	Girls Soccer	Softball	Boys Track & Field	Girls Track & Field	Girls Volleyball	Boys Wrestling	Girls Wrestling
Brookfield Academy	●	●	●	●	●	●	●	●	●	●	●	●	●		
Catholic Central	●	●	●	●	●	●	●			●	●	●	●	●	●
Christian Life	●	●	●	●	●	●	●	●	●		●	●	●	●	●
Heritage Christian	●	●	●	●	●		●	●	● (Note: Co-operative with Milwaukee Lutheran)		●	●	●		
Kingdom Prep Lutheran	●	●		●		●	●	●			●			●	
Lake Country Lutheran	●	●	●	●	●		●	●	●	●	●	●	●	●	●
Living Word Lutheran	●	●	●	●	●	●	●	●	●	●	●	●	●	●	●
Luther Prep	●	●	●	●	●		●	●	●	●	●	●	●	●	●
Messmer		●	●	●	●						●	●	●		
St. Francis	●	●	●			●	● (Note: Co-operative with Cudahy)			●	●	●	●		
St. John's Northwestern		●		●			● (Note: Co-operative with Chesterton Academy)	●			●			● (Note: Co-operative with Chesterton Academy and University Lake School)	●
University School	●	●	●	●	●	●	●	●	●		●	●	●		

== List of state champions ==
=== Fall sports ===
Boys Cross Country
School	Year	Organization	Division
University School	1983	WISAA	Class C
St. Lawrence Seminary	1993	WISAA	Division 2
St. Joseph	2010	WIAA	Division 3

Girls Cross Country
School	Year	Organization	Division
University School	2024	WIAA	Division 2

Football
School	Year	Organization	Division
St. Mary’s	1983	WISAA	Class B
Northwestern Prep	1984	WISAA	Class B
Winnebago Lutheran	1986	WISAA	Class B
St. John's Military Academy	1988	WISAA	Class B
Northwestern Prep	1989	WISAA	Division 2
Northwestern Prep	1990	WISAA	Division 2
Catholic Central	1991	WISAA	Division 3
Northwestern Prep	1991	WISAA	Division 2
Catholic Central	2008	WIAA	Division 7
Catholic Central	2009	WIAA	Division 7
Lake Country Lutheran	2019	WIAA	Division 5

Girls Golf
School	Year	Organization	Division
The Prairie School	2010	WIAA	Division 2

Boys Soccer
School	Year	Organization	Division
Sheboygan Christian	1992	WISAA	Division 2
University School	1993	WISAA	Division 2
Central Wisconsin Christian	1994	WISAA	Division 2
University School	1995	WISAA	Division 2
University School	1996	WISAA	Division 2
Kettle Moraine Lutheran	1997	WISAA	Division 2
Sheboygan Christian	1998	WISAA	Division 2
Heritage Christian	1999	WISAA	Division 2
The Prairie School	2004	WIAA	Division 3
The Prairie School	2005	WIAA	Division 3
Shoreland Lutheran	2007	WIAA	Division 3
St. Catherine's	2009	WIAA	Division 3
The Prairie School	2010	WIAA	Division 3
The Prairie School	2011	WIAA	Division 3
University School	2013	WIAA	Division 4
University School	2018	WIAA	Division 4
Shoreland Lutheran	2023	WIAA	Division 4
Lake Country Lutheran	2024	WIAA	Division 4

Girls Tennis
School	Year	Organization	Division
University School	1983	WISAA	
University School	1984	WISAA	
The Prairie School	1985	WISAA	
The Prairie School	1986	WISAA	
University School	1988	WISAA	
University School	1989	WISAA	
University School	1990	WISAA	
University School	1991	WISAA	
University School	1995	WISAA	
University School	1997	WISAA	
The Prairie School	2000	WIAA	Division 2
The Prairie School	2001	WIAA	Division 2
University School	2004	WIAA	Division 2
University School	2005	WIAA	Division 2
University School	2006	WIAA	Division 2
University School	2007	WIAA	Division 2
University School	2011	WIAA	Division 2
University School	2012	WIAA	Division 2
University School	2014	WIAA	Division 2
University School	2017	WIAA	Division 2
University School	2018	WIAA	Division 2
University School	2022	WIAA	Division 2
University School	2023	WIAA	Division 2
University School	2024	WIAA	Division 2

Girls Volleyball
School	Year	Organization	Division
Northwestern Prep	1983	WISAA	Class B
St. Mary’s	1984	WISAA	Class B
Kettle Moraine Lutheran	1988	WISAA	Class B
Heritage Christian	1993	WISAA	Division 2
Catholic Central	2006	WIAA	Division 4
Catholic Central	2007	WIAA	Division 4
Catholic Central	2008	WIAA	Division 4
St. Catherine's	2010	WIAA	Division 3
Catholic Central	2011	WIAA	Division 4
Lake Country Lutheran	2017	WIAA	Division 3
Lake Country Lutheran	2018	WIAA	Division 3

=== Winter sports ===
Boys Basketball
School	Year	Organization	Division
St. Mary’s	1984	WISAA	Class B
Northwestern Prep	1985	WISAA	Class B
Northwestern Prep	1986	WISAA	Class B
Northwestern Prep	1990	WISAA	Class B
Racine Lutheran	1991	WISAA	Class B
Northwestern Prep	1992	WISAA	Division 2
Sheboygan Christian	1992	WISAA	Division 3
Central Wisconsin Christian	1993	WISAA	Division 3
Messmer	1995	WISAA	Division 2
Racine Lutheran	1995	WISAA	Division 3
Racine Lutheran	1996	WISAA	Division 2
Messmer	1997	WISAA	Division 2
Racine Lutheran	1998	WISAA	Division 2
Lourdes Academy	1999	WISAA	Division 2
Catholic Central	2001	WIAA	Division 4
The Prairie School	2004	WIAA	Division 4
Catholic Central	2006	WIAA	Division 4
St. Catherine's	2009	WIAA	Division 3
St. Catherine's	2010	WIAA	Division 3
Dominican	2012	WIAA	Division 4
Lake Country Lutheran	2022	WIAA	Division 3

Girls Basketball
School	Year	Organization	Division
Shoreland Lutheran	1985	WISAA	Class B
Winnebago Lutheran	1988	WISAA	Class B
Shoreland Lutheran	1989	WISAA	Class B
Kettle Moraine Lutheran	1990	WISAA	Class B
Winnebago Lutheran	1991	WISAA	Class B
Heritage Christian	2012	WIAA	Division 5

=== Spring sports ===
Baseball
School	Year	Organization	Division
St. Mary’s	1989	WISAA	Class B
Catholic Central	1992	WISAA	Division 2
Catholic Central	1993	WISAA	Division 2
Shoreland Lutheran	1994	WISAA	Division 2
Catholic Central	1996	WISAA	Division 2
Racine Lutheran	1997	WISAA	Division 2
Catholic Central	1999	WISAA	
Catholic Central	2004	WIAA	Division 3
Catholic Central	2005	WIAA	Division 3
Catholic Central	2008	WIAA	Division 4
St. Joseph	2009	WIAA	Division 3
Catholic Central	2010	WIAA	Division 4
University School	2010	WIAA	Division 2
Catholic Central	2011	WIAA	Division 4
Lake Country Lutheran	2014	WIAA	Division 4
Lake Country Lutheran	2015	WIAA	Division 3

Boys Golf
School	Year	Organization	Division
Wayland Academy	1999	WISAA	
The Prairie School	2005	WIAA	Division 3

Girls Soccer
School	Year	Organization	Division
University School	2008	WIAA	Division 3
Lake Country Lutheran	2012	WIAA	Division 3
Brookfield Academy	2017	WIAA	Division 4
Brookfield Academy	2021	WIAA	Division 4
Lake Country Lutheran	2022	WIAA	Division 4

Softball
School	Year	Organization	Division
St. Mary’s	1987	WISAA	Class B
Shoreland Lutheran	1988	WISAA	Class B
Catholic Central	1991	WISAA	Class B
Kettle Moraine Lutheran	1998	WISAA	Class B
Catholic Central	2000	WISAA	Class B
Catholic Central	2004	WIAA	Division 4

Boys Tennis
School	Year	Organization	Division
University School	2004	WIAA	Division 2
University School	2006	WIAA	Division 2
University School	2007	WIAA	Division 2
University School	2008	WIAA	Division 2
University School	2009	WIAA	Division 2
University School	2010	WIAA	Division 2
University School	2011	WIAA	Division 2
University School	2013	WIAA	Division 2
University School	2014	WIAA	Division 2
University School	2015	WIAA	Division 2
Brookfield Academy	2022	WIAA	Division 2
Brookfield Academy	2023	WIAA	Division 2
Brookfield Academy	2024	WIAA	Division 2

Boys Track & Field
School	Year	Organization	Division
St. John's Military Academy	1984	WISAA	Class C
Central Wisconsin Christian	1985	WISAA	Class C
University School	1991	WISAA	Class B
Northwestern Prep	1995	WISAA	Class B
Brookfield Academy	2010	WIAA	Division 3

Girls Track & Field
School	Year	Organization	Division
Winnebago Lutheran	1989	WISAA	Class B
Winnebago Lutheran	1991	WISAA	Class B
Winnebago Lutheran	1997	WISAA	Division 2

== List of conference champions ==
=== Boys Basketball ===
School	Quantity	Years
Racine Lutheran	13	1984, 1987, 1990, 1991, 1992, 1993, 1995, 1998, 1999, 2001, 2009, 2010, 2012
Northwestern Prep	9	1984, 1985, 1986, 1989, 1990, 1991, 1992, 1994, 1995
Brookfield Academy	7	2010, 2013, 2014, 2015, 2016, 2018, 2023
Lake Country Lutheran	7	2007, 2021, 2022, 2023, 2024, 2025, 2026
Messmer	6	1994, 1996, 2002, 2003, 2004, 2014
St. John's Northwestern	6	2005, 2006, 2009, 2011, 2019, 2020
Dominican	5	2007, 2008, 2010, 2011, 2012
Martin Luther	4	1984, 1985, 1986, 1988
Winnebago Lutheran	4	1987, 1988, 1993, 1994
Heritage Christian	3	1999, 2002, 2003
Shoreland Lutheran	3	1989, 1997, 2000
The Prairie School	3	1989, 1992, 2001
University School	3	1990, 1992, 2017
(St. Mary’s); Catholic Central	2	1984, 2006
Kettle Moraine Lutheran	2	1988, 1998
Luther Prep	2	1996, 1997
Sheboygan Christian	2	1995, 1997
St. Catherine's	2	2009, 2012
Wayland Academy	2	1998, 1999
Central Wisconsin Christian	1	1995
Christian Life	1	2008
HOPE Christian	0	
Kingdom Prep Lutheran	0	
Living Word Lutheran	0	
Lourdes Academy	0	
N.E.W. Lutheran	0	
Notre Dame	0	
Sheboygan Lutheran	0	
St. Francis	0	
St. Joseph	0	
St. Lawrence Seminary	0	
St. Mary Catholic	0	

=== Girls Basketball ===
School	Quantity	Years
Shoreland Lutheran	15	1986, 1987, 1989, 1992, 1993, 1994, 1997, 1999, 2001, 2002, 2003, 2005, 2006, 2009, 2010
Kettle Moraine Lutheran	11	1984, 1987, 1988, 1989, 1990, 1992, 1993, 1994, 1995, 1996, 1997
Heritage Christian	10	1999, 2000, 2002, 2003, 2009, 2011, 2012, 2013, 2014, 2015
Lake Country Lutheran	7	2010, 2014, 2021, 2022, 2023, 2025, 2026
Brookfield Academy	6	1997, 2016, 2017, 2018, 2019, 2020
The Prairie School	6	1998, 1999, 2001, 2003, 2004, 2008
Martin Luther	5	1988, 1990, 1991, 1995, 1996
(St. Mary’s); Catholic Central	3	1984, 1985, 2007
Dominican	3	2010, 2011, 2012
Winnebago Lutheran	3	1984, 1991, 1998
Christian Life	2	2006, 2007
Living Word Lutheran	2	2008, 2024
Sheboygan Christian	2	1984, 1991
Luther Prep	1	2025
Northwestern Prep	1	1984
St. Mary Catholic	1	1999
University School	1	2002
Wayland Academy	1	2000
Central Wisconsin Christian	0	
HOPE Christian	0	
Lourdes Academy	0	
Messmer	0	
N.E.W. Lutheran	0	
Notre Dame	0	
Racine Lutheran	0	
Sheboygan Lutheran	0	
St. Catherine's	0	
St. Francis	0	
St. Joan Antida	0	
St. Joseph	0	

=== Football ===
School	Quantity	Years
(St. Mary’s); Catholic Central	13	1983, 1985, 1990, 1991, 1999, 2000, 2001, 2002, 2004, 2007, 2008, 2009, 2010
Lake Country Lutheran	10	2009, 2010, 2011, 2012, 2014, 2015, 2016, 2017, 2018, 2019
Racine Lutheran	7	2002, 2004, 2006, 2007, 2020, 2025, 2026
St. Joseph	6	2021, 2022, 2023, 2024, 2025, 2026
Martin Luther	4	1984, 1988, 1994, 2003
University School	4	1994, 2002, 2007, 2011
Winnebago Lutheran	4	1986, 1987, 1992, 1993
Brookfield Academy	3	2008, 2009, 2024
Northwestern Prep	3	1983, 1984, 1989
St. John's Northwestern	2	1983, 1988
Living Word Lutheran	1	2011
Milwaukee Academy of Science	1	2024
Shoreland Lutheran	1	2005
Shorewood/ Messmer	1	2013
St. Catherine's	1	2011
Christian Life	0	
Cudahy	0	
Dominican	0	
Heritage Christian	0	
Holy Name Seminary	0	
HOPE Christian	0	
Kingdom Prep Lutheran	0	
Lourdes Academy	0	
Pius XI	0	
St. Francis	0	
St. Lawrence Seminary	0	
St. Mary Catholic	0	
Wayland Academy	0	
