= Flett =

Flett is a surname, and may refer to:

- Andy Flett (born 1971), singer, songwriter and musician
- Bill Flett (1943–1999), professional hockey player
- Dave Flett (born c. 1950), British rock guitarist
- Doug Flett (1935–2019), Australian songwriter with Guy Fletcher
- George Flett (1817–1897), Presbyterian missionary in northern Canada
- Jack Flett (1871–1932), Canadian lacrosse player
- James Flett (1906–1986), Australian painter and author
- John Flett (geologist) (1869–1947), Scottish physician and geologist
- John Flett (rugby union) (born 1963), Australian rugby union player
- John Flett (fashion designer) (1963–1991), British fashion designer
- Kathryn Flett (born 1964), British TV critic and Grumpy Old Woman
- Keith Flett (born 1956), socialist historian
- Penny Flett (1947–2025), Australian geriatric medical specialist
- Rod Flett (1873–1927), Canadian Métis ice hockey player
- Steve Flett (born 1972), singer, songwriter and musician
- Sze Flett, Australian scientist
- Thomas Muirhead Flett (1923–1976), English mathematician
- Una Flett (1939–2021), Scottish writer and ballerina
- William H. Flett (1856–1911), American politician
- William Roberts Flett, Scottish geologist and author
- William Robertson Flett, Canadian politician
- Winona Flett (1884–1922), Canadian suffragist and social reformer

== See also ==
- Flett Glacier
