= Metro Conference (Wisconsin) =

Wisconsin high school athletic conference (1974-1997)

The Metro Conference is a former high school athletic conference in Wisconsin, formed in 1974 and dissolving in 1997. It consisted entirely of private high schools in the Milwaukee metropolitan area, and most were Catholic high schools within the Roman Catholic Archdiocese of Milwaukee.

== History ==
Location of Original Metro Conference Members

The Metro Conference was formed in 1974 as the successor to the Milwaukee Catholic Conference and had twelve original members. It was formed in the wake of the successful application by Milwaukee Lutheran High School to join the Milwaukee Catholic Conference in the early 1970s. All of its member schools competed under the banner of the Wisconsin Independent Schools Athletic Association, an organization for private high school athletic programs in the state of Wisconsin.

The conference maintained a very consistent membership roster during its existence, only losing three members: St. John's Cathedral in 1976 (due to closing), Messmer in 1984 (due to nearly closing and exit from archdiocese) and St. Joan Antida in 1989 (joined the Midwest Classic Conference). The Metro Conference was very successful at state-level competitions within WISAA, with its most high-profile successes coming in basketball. During its twenty-three-year history, Metro Conference member schools won twenty boys and eighteen girls WISAA basketball championships.

After the 1994 football season, the Metro Conference lost both St. Catherine's and St. Joseph to the new Wisconsin Independent Football Association, leaving the conference with six football members. The Metro Conference was disbanded in 1997 in anticipation for the coming merger between WISAA and the Wisconsin Interscholastic Athletic Association, the state's high school athletics organization for public schools. All of its member schools went to established WIAA conferences after the 1996-97 school year.

== Conference membership history ==
=== Final members ===
School	Location	Affiliation	Mascot	Colors	Joined	Left	Conference Joined	Current Conference
Catholic Memorial	Waukesha, WI	Private (Catholic)	Crusaders		1974	1997	Classic Eight	
Divine Savior Holy Angels	Milwaukee, WI	Private (Catholic)	Dashers		1974	1997	Greater Metro	
Dominican	Whitefish Bay, WI	Private (Catholic, Sinsinawa Dominicans)	Knights		1974	1997	Parkland	Metro Classic
Marquette University	Milwaukee, WI	Private (Catholic, Jesuit)	Hilltoppers		1974	1997	Greater Metro	
Milwaukee Lutheran	Milwaukee, WI	Private (Lutheran, LCMS)	Red Knights		1974	1997	North Shore	Woodland
Pius XI	Milwaukee, WI	Private (Catholic)	Popes		1974	1997	Classic Eight	Woodland
St. Catherine's	Racine, WI	Private (Catholic, Dominican)	Angels		1974	1997	Lakeshore	Metro Classic
St. Joseph	Kenosha, WI	Private (Catholic)	Lancers		1974	1997	Lakeshore	Metro Classic
Thomas More	Milwaukee, WI	Private (Catholic)	Cavaliers		1974	1997	Woodland	Metro Classic

=== Previous members ===
School	Location	Affiliation	Mascot	Colors	Joined	Left	Conference Joined	Current Conference
Messmer	Milwaukee, WI	Private (Catholic)	Bishops		1974	1984	Independent	Midwest Classic
St. Joan Antida	Milwaukee, WI	Private (Catholic)	Jaguars		1974	1989	Midwest Classic	Lake City
St. John's Cathedral	Milwaukee, WI	Private (Catholic)	Eagles		1974	1976	Closed in 1976	

== List of state championships ==
=== Fall sports ===
Boys Cross Country
School	Year	Organization	Division
Thomas More	1974	WISAA	Class A
St. Catherine's	1975	WISAA	Class A
Thomas More	1976	WISAA	Class A
Thomas More	1978	WISAA	Class A
Thomas More	1980	WISAA	Class A
Thomas More	1981	WISAA	Class A
Marquette University	1984	WISAA	Class A
St. Catherine's	1985	WISAA	Class A
Marquette University	1986	WISAA	Class A
Marquette University	1987	WISAA	Class A
Marquette University	1988	WISAA	Class A
Marquette University	1989	WISAA	Class A
Marquette University	1990	WISAA	Class A
Marquette University	1991	WISAA	Class A
Marquette University	1992	WISAA	Division 1
Pius XI	1993	WISAA	Division 1
Marquette University	1994	WISAA	Division 1
Marquette University	1995	WISAA	Division 1
St. Catherine's	1996	WISAA	Division 1

Girls Cross Country
School	Year	Organization	Division
Catholic Memorial	1980	WISAA	
Catholic Memorial	1981	WISAA	Class A
Catholic Memorial	1982	WISAA	Class A
Catholic Memorial	1983	WISAA	Class A
Dominican	1984	WISAA	Class A
Catholic Memorial	1985	WISAA	Class A
Catholic Memorial	1988	WISAA	Class A
Catholic Memorial	1989	WISAA	Class A
Catholic Memorial	1991	WISAA	Class A
Catholic Memorial	1992	WISAA	Division 1
Catholic Memorial	1993	WISAA	Division 1
Catholic Memorial	1994	WISAA	Division 1
Catholic Memorial	1995	WISAA	Division 1

Football
School	Year	Organization	Division
Marquette University	1975	WISAA	
Thomas More	1976	WISAA	Class A
Thomas More	1977	WISAA	Class A
Catholic Memorial	1979	WISAA	Class A
Thomas More	1981	WISAA	Class A
Marquette University	1982	WISAA	Class A
Marquette University	1985	WISAA	Class A
Marquette University	1987	WISAA	Class A
Marquette University	1988	WISAA	Class A
Catholic Memorial	1989	WISAA	Division 1
Dominican	1990	WISAA	Division 2
Catholic Memorial	1993	WISAA	Division 1
Marquette University	1994	WISAA	Division 1
Catholic Memorial	1996	WISAA	Division 1

Golf
School	Year	Organization
St. Catherine's	1974	WISAA
Pius XI	1976	WISAA
Marquette University	1982	WISAA
Marquette University	1983	WISAA
Marquette University	1992	WISAA
Catholic Memorial	1993	WISAA
Catholic Memorial	1994	WISAA

Boys Soccer
School	Year	Organization	Division
Marquette University	1979	WISAA	
Pius XI	1980	WISAA	
Marquette University	1981	WISAA	
Marquette University	1982	WISAA	
Catholic Memorial	1983	WISAA	
Marquette University	1984	WISAA	
Marquette University	1985	WISAA	
Marquette University	1986	WISAA	
Pius XI	1988	WISAA	
Marquette University	1989	WISAA	
Marquette University	1990	WISAA	
Catholic Memorial	1991	WISAA	
Marquette University	1992	WISAA	Division 1
Pius XI	1993	WISAA	Division 1
Marquette University	1994	WISAA	Division 1
Marquette University	1995	WISAA	Division 1
Marquette University	1996	WISAA	Division 1

Girls Tennis
School	Year	Organization
Dominican	1978	WISAA
Dominican	1979	WISAA
DSHA	1992	WISAA
DSHA	1993	WISAA
DSHA	1994	WISAA
DSHA	1996	WISAA

Volleyball
School	Year	Organization	Division
Dominican	1974	WISAA	
Milwaukee Lutheran	1975	WISAA	
Dominican	1976	WISAA	
Milwaukee Lutheran	1977	WISAA	
St. Catherine's	1978	WISAA	
Dominican	1979	WISAA	
Pius XI	1981	WISAA	Class A
Pius XI	1982	WISAA	Class A
Pius XI	1983	WISAA	Class A
Pius XI	1984	WISAA	Class A
DSHA	1985	WISAA	Class A
Pius XI	1986	WISAA	Class A
Pius XI	1987	WISAA	Class A
Pius XI	1988	WISAA	Class A
Pius XI	1989	WISAA	Class A
Pius XI	1990	WISAA	Class A
Pius XI	1991	WISAA	Class A
Pius XI	1992	WISAA	Division 1
Pius XI	1993	WISAA	Division 1
Pius XI	1994	WISAA	Division 1

=== Winter sports ===
Boys Basketball
School	Year	Organization	Division
Pius XI	1975	WISAA	Class A
Pius XI	1976	WISAA	Class A
St. Catherine's	1977	WISAA	Class A
Dominican	1978	WISAA	Class A
Dominican	1979	WISAA	Class A
Marquette University	1980	WISAA	Class A
Marquette University	1981	WISAA	Class A
Marquette University	1983	WISAA	Class A
Marquette University	1984	WISAA	Class A
St. Catherine's	1985	WISAA	Class A
Marquette University	1986	WISAA	Class A
Catholic Memorial	1987	WISAA	Class A
Thomas More	1988	WISAA	Class A
Marquette University	1989	WISAA	Class A
Dominican	1991	WISAA	Class A
St. Catherine's	1992	WISAA	Division 1
St. Catherine's	1993	WISAA	Division 1
Marquette University	1994	WISAA	Division 1
Pius XI	1996	WISAA	Division 1
Dominican	1997	WISAA	Division 1

Girls Basketball
School	Year	Organization	Division
St. Catherine's	1976	WISAA	
Milwaukee Lutheran	1977	WISAA	
St. Catherine's	1979	WISAA	Class A
Pius XI	1980	WISAA	Class A
Pius XI	1982	WISAA	Class A
Pius XI	1983	WISAA	Class A
Pius XI	1984	WISAA	Class A
Pius XI	1985	WISAA	Class A
Pius XI	1986	WISAA	Class A
Pius XI	1987	WISAA	Class A
Pius XI	1988	WISAA	Class A
Pius XI	1989	WISAA	Class A
Pius XI	1990	WISAA	Class A
Pius XI	1991	WISAA	Class A
Pius XI	1992	WISAA	Division 1
Pius XI	1993	WISAA	Division 1
Pius XI	1995	WISAA	Division 1
DSHA	1996	WISAA	Division 1
Pius XI	1997	WISAA	Division 1

Wrestling
School	Year	Organization
Thomas More	1975	WISAA
St. Joseph	1978	WISAA
Pius XI	1979	WISAA
Marquette University	1980	WISAA
Marquette University	1981	WISAA
Marquette University	1982	WISAA
Catholic Memorial	1991	WISAA
Catholic Memorial	1992	WISAA
Catholic Memorial	1995	WISAA
Catholic Memorial	1996	WISAA

=== Spring sports ===
Baseball
School	Year	Organization
St. Catherine's	1975	WISAA
St. Catherine's	1976	WISAA
St. Joseph	1977	WISAA
Thomas More	1981	WISAA
Marquette University	1982	WISAA
Catholic Memorial	1983	WISAA
St. Joseph	1988	WISAA
St. Catherine's	1989	WISAA
Catholic Memorial	1990	WISAA
Marquette University	1992	WISAA
Marquette University	1993	WISAA
Pius XI	1994	WISAA
Marquette University	1995	WISAA
Thomas More	1996	WISAA
Marquette University	1997	WISAA

Girls Soccer
School	Year	Organization
Pius XI	1987	WISAA
DSHA	1988	WISAA
Pius XI	1989	WISAA
Pius XI	1990	WISAA
Pius XI	1991	WISAA
Pius XI	1992	WISAA
DSHA	1993	WISAA
Pius XI	1994	WISAA
Pius XI	1995	WISAA
Catholic Memorial	1996	WISAA
Pius XI	1997	WISAA

Softball
School	Year	Organization	Division
St. Catherine's	1977	WISAA	
Milwaukee Lutheran	1978	WISAA	
St. Joseph	1979	WISAA	
Pius XI	1980	WISAA	
DSHA	1981	WISAA	
Dominican	1982	WISAA	
Catholic Memorial	1983	WISAA	
Pius XI	1986	WISAA	Class A
Pius XI	1989	WISAA	Class A
Pius XI	1990	WISAA	Class A
Pius XI	1991	WISAA	Class A
Pius XI	1992	WISAA	Division 1
St. Catherine's	1993	WISAA	Division 1
St. Catherine's	1994	WISAA	Division 1
Pius XI	1995	WISAA	Division 1

Boys Tennis
School	Year	Organization
Marquette University	1981	WISAA
Marquette University	1982	WISAA
Marquette University	1983	WISAA
Marquette University	1984	WISAA
Marquette University	1985	WISAA
Marquette University	1986	WISAA
Marquette University	1988	WISAA
Marquette University	1989	WISAA
Marquette University	1990	WISAA
Marquette University	1991	WISAA
Marquette University	1992	WISAA
Marquette University	1993	WISAA
Marquette University	1994	WISAA
Marquette University	1995	WISAA
Marquette University	1996	WISAA
Marquette University	1997	WISAA

Boys Track & Field
School	Year	Organization	Division
Pius XI	1975	WISAA	Class A
Marquette University	1976	WISAA	Class A
Marquette University	1977	WISAA	Class A
Pius XI	1978	WISAA	Class A
Pius XI	1979	WISAA	Class A
Marquette University	1982	WISAA	Class A
Marquette University	1983	WISAA	Class A
Marquette University	1984	WISAA	Class A
Marquette University	1985	WISAA	Class A
Marquette University	1986	WISAA	Class A
Marquette University	1988	WISAA	Class A
Marquette University	1989	WISAA	Class A
Marquette University	1990	WISAA	Class A
Catholic Memorial	1991	WISAA	Class A
Catholic Memorial	1992	WISAA	Division 1
Marquette University	1995	WISAA	Division 1
Catholic Memorial	1996	WISAA	Division 1

Girls Track & Field
School	Year	Organization	Division
Pius XI	1979	WISAA	Class A
Pius XI	1980	WISAA	Class A
Catholic Memorial	1981	WISAA	Class A
Catholic Memorial	1982	WISAA	Class A
Pius XI	1983	WISAA	Class A
Pius XI	1984	WISAA	Class A
Pius XI	1985	WISAA	Class A
Pius XI	1986	WISAA	Class A
Pius XI	1987	WISAA	Class A
Pius XI	1988	WISAA	Class A
Pius XI	1989	WISAA	Class A
Pius XI	1990	WISAA	Class A
Catholic Memorial	1991	WISAA	Class A
Pius XI	1992	WISAA	Division 1
Catholic Memorial	1993	WISAA	Division 1
Catholic Memorial	1994	WISAA	Division 1
Catholic Memorial	1995	WISAA	Division 1
St. Joseph	1995	WISAA	Division 2
Catholic Memorial	1996	WISAA	Division 1

== List of conference champions ==
=== Boys Basketball ===
School	Quantity	Years
Marquette University	10	1975, 1976, 1981, 1983, 1986, 1989, 1990, 1991, 1992, 1994
Dominican	5	1978, 1979, 1980, 1991, 1997
Thomas More	4	1977, 1982, 1987, 1988
Pius XI	3	1995, 1996, 1997
Catholic Memorial	2	1987, 1993
St. Catherine's	2	1977, 1992
Messmer	1	1982
Milwaukee Lutheran	1	1985
St. Joseph	1	1984
St. John's Cathedral	0	

=== Girls Basketball ===
School	Quantity	Years
Pius XI	18	1980, 1981, 1982, 1983, 1984, 1985, 1986, 1987, 1988, 1989, 1990, 1991, 1992, 1993, 1994, 1995, 1996, 1997
St. Catherine's	3	1976, 1977, 1979
Milwaukee Lutheran	1	1978
Catholic Memorial	0	
Dominican	0	
DSHA	0	
Messmer	0	
St. Joan Antida	0	
St. John's Cathedral	0	
St. Joseph	0	
Thomas More	0	

=== Football ===
School	Quantity	Years
Marquette University	9	1985, 1986, 1987, 1988, 1989, 1990, 1994, 1995, 1996
Catholic Memorial	6	1982, 1983, 1984, 1991, 1993, 1996
Thomas More	5	1974, 1976, 1979, 1980, 1981
St. Catherine's	3	1975, 1977, 1978
Pius XI	1	1992
Dominican	0	
Messmer	0	
Milwaukee Lutheran	0	
St. John's Cathedral	0	
St. Joseph	0	
