= Lakeshore Conference (Wisconsin) =

Wisconsin high school athletic conference (1997-2008)

The Lakeshore Conference is a former high school athletic conference with membership concentrated in southeastern Wisconsin. It was operational from 1997 to 2008, and all members belonged to the Wisconsin Interscholastic Athletic Association at the time of the conference's dissolution.

== History ==
Location of Lakeshore Conference Members

The Lakeshore Conference was formed in 1997 during a period of realignment among high school athletic conferences in Wisconsin. The five public high schools (Badger, Union Grove, Waterford, Westosha Central and Wilmot Union) were all former members of the Eastern Division of the Southern Lakes Conference, which was dissolved that year. The sixth member of the Eastern Division, Burlington, would go on to join the Southeast Conference. The two private high schools (St. Catherine's in Racine and St. Joseph in Kenosha) were former members of the Metro Conference, which had been affiliated with the Wisconsin Independent Schools Athletic Association. In 1997, WISAA began a merger process with the WIAA that would be finished for the 2000-01 school year, which was the main catalyst for the Metro Conference's ending. The Lakeshore Conference maintained the same seven-member roster during the entirety of its eleven-year existence. In 2008, the five public high schools returned to the Southern Lakes Conference in a reversal of the realignment that had occurred eleven years earlier. That same year, St. Catherine's and St. Joseph both joined the Midwest Classic Conference, and both were part of a group of eight schools that split off from the conference to create the Metro Classic Conference in 2012.

== Conference membership history ==
School	Location	Affiliation	Mascot	Colors	Joined	Left	Conference Joined	Current Conference
Badger	Lake Geneva, WI	Public	Badgers		1997	2008	Southern Lakes	
St. Catherine's	Racine, WI	Private (Catholic, Racine Dominicans)	Angels		1997	2008	Midwest Classic	Metro Classic
St. Joseph	Kenosha, WI	Private (Catholic)	Lancers		1997	2008	Midwest Classic	Metro Classic
Union Grove	Union Grove, WI	Public	Broncos		1997	2008	Southern Lakes	
Waterford	Waterford, WI	Public	Wolverines		1997	2008	Southern Lakes	
Westosha Central	Paddock Lake, WI	Public	Falcons		1997	2008	Southern Lakes	
Wilmot Union	Wilmot, WI	Public	Panthers		1997	2008	Southern Lakes	

== List of state champions ==
=== Fall sports ===
Girls Volleyball
School	Year	Division
Westosha Central	2003	Division 1
Westosha Central	2004	Division 1
Westosha Central	2006	Division 1

=== Winter sports ===
Boys Basketball
School	Year	Division
St. Catherine's	2005	Division 2
St. Catherine's	2006	Division 2
St. Catherine's	2007	Division 2

=== Spring sports ===
Baseball
School	Year	Division
Westosha Central	2002	Division 1
St. Joseph	2005	Division 2
St. Joseph	2006	Division 3

Softball
School	Year	Division
Union Grove	2007	Division 2

== List of conference champions ==
=== Boys Basketball ===
School	Quantity	Years
St. Catherine's	6	1998, 2000, 2002, 2004, 2005, 2006
St. Joseph	4	1999, 2001, 2003, 2004
Badger	1	2008
Union Grove	1	2007
Westosha Central	1	1998
Waterford	0	
Wilmot Union	0	

=== Girls Basketball ===
School	Quantity	Years
St. Catherine's	6	1999, 2000, 2002, 2003, 2004, 2005
Waterford	2	2005, 2006
Badger	1	1998
St. Joseph	1	2001
Union Grove	1	2007
Westosha Central	1	2008
Wilmot Union	0	

=== Football ===
School	Quantity	Years
Wilmot Union	5	1998, 1999, 2000, 2001, 2004
St. Joseph	4	1997, 2002, 2003, 2005
Union Grove	2	2005, 2006
Waterford	2	2004, 2007
Badger	1	2007
St. Catherine's	1	2007
Westosha Central	1	2005
