= Thomas Muirhead =

Thomas Muirhead may refer to:

- Tommy Muirhead (1897–1979), Scottish footballer born Thomas Muirhead
- Thomas Muirhead (curler) (born 1995), Scottish curler
- Thomas Muirhead Flett (1923–1976), Scottish mathematician
