= Metro Classic Conference =

Wisconsin high school athletic conference

The Metro Classic Conference is a high school athletic conference with its membership concentrated in southeastern Wisconsin. Formed in 2012 and consisting entirely of private schools, all members belong to the Wisconsin Interscholastic Athletic Association.

== History ==
The Metro Classic Conference was founded in 2012, the result of a split between member schools in the larger Midwest Classic Conference. Eight schools left the conference that year: Catholic Central in Burlington, Dominican in Whitefish Bay, Martin Luther in Greendale, Racine Lutheran, Shoreland Lutheran in Somers, St. Catherine's in Racine, St. Joseph in Kenosha and The Prairie School in Wind Point. St. Thomas More High School in Milwaukee, who had just left the Woodland Conference, rounded out the loop's original membership roster at nine schools. The conference was named after the old Metro Conference, a WISAA-sponsored conference that existed from 1974 to 1997 and counted four former members (Dominican, St. Catherine's, St. Joseph and St. Thomas More) in the new conference. Aside from Burlington Catholic Central's exit from the conference to return to the Midwest Classic, the Metro Classic Conference has held the same membership throughout its existence.

=== Football ===
The Metro Classic Conference has sponsored football since its founding, with all members participating except for The Prairie School, which has never offered football as an interscholastic sport. Major changes came to the conference's football alignment after the Wisconsin Football Coaches Association and the WIAA unveiled a realignment plan for Wisconsin high school football to begin with the 2020 football season and run on a two-year cycle. Half of the conference's eight-member football lineup was retained, (Martin Luther, Shoreland Lutheran, St. Catherine's and St. Thomas More) with the other half (Catholic Central, Dominican, Racine Lutheran and St. Joseph) moving over to the Midwest Classic Conference. The four exiting schools were replaced by three schools from the Midwest Classic (Lake Country Lutheran, St. Francis and University School) and Brown Deer of the Woodland Conference. St. Francis left the Metro Classic's football roster to return to the Midwest Classic Conference for the 2022-2023 competition cycle and were replaced with former Capitol Conference members Luther Prep of Watertown. This alignment remained intact for the 2024-2025 cycle, and University School will be swapping affiliations with the Shorewood/Messmer/Dominican football cooperative in 2026, with the former joining the Midwest Classic Conference.

== List of member schools ==
=== Current members ===
School	Location	Affiliation	Enrollment	Mascot	Colors	Joined
Dominican	Whitefish Bay, WI	Private (Catholic, Sinsinawa Dominicans)	317	Knights		2012
Martin Luther	Greendale, WI	Private (LCMS)	673	Spartans		2012
Racine Lutheran	Racine, WI	Private (LCMS)	370	Crusaders		2012
Shoreland Lutheran	Somers, WI	Private (WELS)	467	Pacers		2012
St. Catherine's	Racine, WI	Private (Catholic, Racine Dominicans)	437	Angels		2012
St. Joseph	Kenosha, WI	Private (Catholic)	206	Lancers		2012
St. Thomas More	Milwaukee, WI	Private (Catholic)	599	Cavaliers		2012
The Prairie School	Wind Point, WI	Private (Nonsectarian)	222	Hawks		2012

=== Current associate members ===
School	Location	Affiliation	Mascot	Colors	Primary Conference	Sport(s)
Brown Deer	Brown Deer, WI	Public	Falcons		Woodland	Football
Lake Country Lutheran	Hartland, WI	Private (LCMS)	Lightning		Midwest Classic	Football
Luther Prep	Watertown, WI	Private (WELS)	Phoenix		Midwest Classic	Football
Shorewood	Shorewood, WI	Public	Greyhounds		Woodland	Football (Note: Co-operative with Dominican and Messmer)

=== Former members ===
School	Location	Affiliation	Mascot	Colors	Joined	Left	Conference Joined	Current Conference
Catholic Central	Burlington, WI	Private (Catholic)	Hilltoppers		2012	2023	Midwest Classic	

=== Former football-only members ===
School	Location	Affiliation	Mascot	Colors	Seasons	Primary Conference
St. Francis	St. Francis, WI	Public	Mariners		2020-2021	Midwest Classic
University School	River Hills, WI	Private (Nonsectarian)	Wildcats		2020-2025	Midwest Classic

== Membership map ==
Metro Classic Conference
Location of Metro Classic Conference full members:
1 Dominican
2 Martin Luther
3 Racine Lutheran
4 Shoreland Lutheran
5 St. Catherine's
6 St. Joseph
7 St. Thomas More
8 The Prairie School

== Sanctioned sports ==
	Baseball	Boys Basketball	Girls Basketball	Boys Cross Country	Girls Cross Country	Football	Boys Golf	Boys Soccer	Girls Soccer	Softball	Boys Tennis	Girls Tennis	Boys Track & Field	Girls Track & Field	Girls Volleyball	Boys Wrestling	Girls Wrestling
Dominican	●	●	●	● (Note: Co-operative with Eastbrook Academy)	●		●	●	●	●	●	●	●	●	●		
Martin Luther	●	●	●	●	●	●	●	●	●	●	●	●	●	●	●	●	●
Racine Lutheran	● (Note: Co-operative with The Prairie School)	●	●	●	●			●	●	●			●	●	●		
Shoreland Lutheran	●	●	●	●	●	●	●	●	●	●	●	●	●	●	●	●	●
St. Catherine's	●	●	●	●	●	●	● (Note: Co-operative with Racine Lutheran)	●	●	●	●	●	●	●	●	●	●
St. Joseph	●	●	●	●	●		●	●	●	● (Note: Co-operative with Christian Life)	●	●	●	●	●	●	●
St. Thomas More	●	●	●	●	●	●	●	●	●	●	●	●	●	●	●		
The Prairie School		●	●	●	●		●	●	●		●	●	●	●	●		

== List of state champions ==
=== Fall sports ===
Football
School	Year	Division
St. Catherine's	2018	Division 4
St. Catherine's	2024	Division 4

Girls Golf
School	Year	Division
The Prairie School	2015	Division 2
The Prairie School	2016	Division 2

Boys Soccer
School	Year	Division
The Prairie School	2014	Division 4
St. Catherine's	2016	Division 4
The Prairie School	2017	Division 4
The Prairie School	2020	Division 3
Shoreland Lutheran	2023	Division 4

Girls Volleyball
School	Year	Division
Catholic Central	2012	Division 4
Catholic Central	2018	Division 4
Catholic Central	2020	Division 4

=== Winter sports ===
Boys Basketball
School	Year	Division
Dominican	2013	Division 4
Dominican	2014	Division 4
Dominican	2015	Division 4
Dominican	2016	Division 4
Martin Luther	2019	Division 3
St. Catherine's	2021	Division 3
St. Thomas More	2024	Division 3
St. Catherine's	2026	Division 3

=== Spring sports ===
Baseball
School	Year	Division
St. Joseph	2021	Division 3

Girls Soccer
School	Year	Division
The Prairie School	2016	Division 4
St. Joseph	2018	Division 4
The Prairie School	2019	Division 4
The Prairie School	2026	Division 4

Boys Tennis
School	Year	Division
The Prairie School	2017	Division 2

== List of conference champions ==
=== Boys Basketball ===
School	Quantity	Years
St. Catherine's	6	2015, 2019, 2020, 2021, 2023, 2025
Dominican	4	2013, 2014, 2015, 2016
Martin Luther	2	2017, 2019
Racine Lutheran	2	2025, 2026
St. Thomas More	2	2022, 2024
The Prairie School	2	2017, 2018
Catholic Central	0	
Shoreland Lutheran	0	
St. Joseph	0	

=== Girls Basketball ===
School	Quantity	Years
The Prairie School	6	2013, 2014, 2022, 2023, 2024, 2025
Martin Luther	3	2017, 2018, 2021
Racine Lutheran	3	2019, 2020, 2021
Dominican	2	2023, 2026
St. Joseph	2	2015, 2016
Shoreland Lutheran	1	2019
St. Catherine's	1	2013
Catholic Central	0	
St. Thomas More	0	

=== Football ===
School	Quantity	Years
St. Catherine's	10	2012, 2013, 2014, 2016, 2017, 2018, 2023, 2024, 2025, 2026
Lake Country Lutheran	3	2021, 2023, 2025
Martin Luther	2	2020, 2022
Catholic Central	1	2015
Luther Prep	1	2023
Racine Lutheran	1	2019
Brown Deer	0	
Dominican	0	
Shoreland Lutheran	0	
Shorewood/ Messmer/ Dominican	0	
St. Francis	0	
St. Joseph	0	
St. Thomas More	0	
University School	0	
