= Jason Johnson (actor) =

American actor (born 1974)

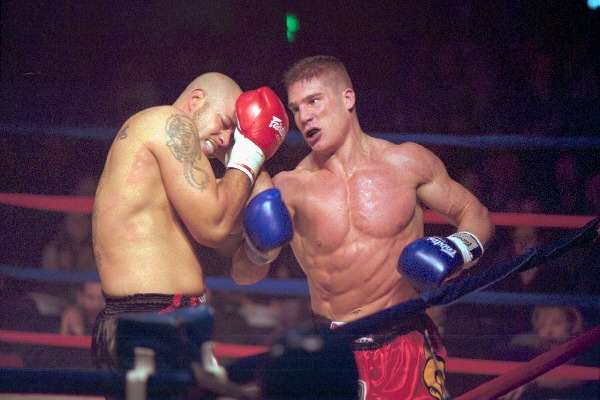
- Born: November 30, 1974 (age 51); Janesville, Wisconsin, U.S.
- Occupations: Kickboxer, fitness professional, actor
- Known for: Professional kickboxing record

Jason Johnson (born November 30, 1974) is a professional kickboxer, U.S. Marine, fitness professional and actor. He lives in Los Angeles, California.

== Early life and education ==
Johnson was in born Janesville, Wisconsin on November 30, 1974. Jason Scott Johnson graduated from Martin Luther High School in Greendale, Wisconsin in 1993. That year he was the Wisconsin State Wrestling Champion at 189 lbs (86 kg).

== U.S. Marines career ==
Johnson was a corporal in the United States Marine Corps and served from 1993 to 1997. He was deployed to Port au Prince, Haiti, where he oversaw peacekeeping efforts, worked with the U.S. Border Patrol in Joint Task Force Operations in Mexico, and he trained with the British Royal Marines in the United Kingdom.

In 1994, Johnson's platoon named him the "Iron Man” of boot camp. That year he also qualified for the Fleet Antiterrorism Security Team in Norfolk, VA, and he remained a member of that team until 1996. Johnson graduated from "Airborne" School at Ft. Benning, Georgia, in 1996. He was a member of the Marine Corps’ 2nd Force Reconnaissance unit.

== Kickboxing career ==
Johnson began his training in Muay Thai kickboxing with the fighter Duke Roufus and won his first fight on September 6, 1998, against Jack Lagrange. Johnson beat experienced opponents and earned himself the nickname "The Gladiator". In 1999, he became the IKF USA National Amateur MuayThai Rules Heavyweight Champion. He also won the World International Federation Muay Thai Amateur (IFMA) Super Heavyweight Championship in Bangkok, Thailand. He was ranked 7th in the world as a professional kickboxer. His record is 15 wins, 1 loss and 11 knockouts.

== Fitness career ==
Johnson is a certified personal trainer and performance enhancement specialist with the National Academy of Sports Medicine.

He founded Go Beyond Fitness. He is a sports and fitness model. In 2010, he was a sports model champion at MuscleMania in Orange County.

Johnson appeared in Bowflex training DVDs and in an 8-volume Muay Thai video series with Duke Roufus. He wrote the 2011 fitness book Recreate Yourself: Simple Steps To Rapidly Burn Fat and Sculpt Your Body. Johnson was also a member of Team USA in Bodybuilding in 2009.

== Acting career ==
Johnson is a member of the Screen Actors Guild and AFTRA. He starred as Ryan Kristoff in Magma: Earth's Molten Core, a 2005 movie directed by Dom Magwili.

== Accreditations and achievements ==
Johnson is a black belt in Tae Kwon Do and a certified CrossFit endurance specialist. He is a certified personal trainer. In 2010, he became a corrective exercise specialist and is a competitive Ironman triathlete. He has appeared in - or written for - Men’s Fitness, Ironman, Physical, Muscle and Fitness and Exercise for Men.
