= Shoreland Lutheran High School =

Location
- Somers, Wisconsin; United States; 42°38′28.1″N 87°55′07.4″W

Information
- Type: Private, 9-12
- Motto: Excellence in Christ
- Religious affiliation: Lutheran (WELS)
- Established: 1971
- Faculty: 27
- Enrollment: 425 students (2023-24)
- Colors: Black and Gold
- Athletics conference: Metro Classic
- Nickname: Pacers
- Website: www.slhs.us

Shoreland Lutheran High School (SLHS) is a Lutheran High School in Somers, Wisconsin, affiliated with the Wisconsin Evangelical Lutheran Synod (WELS) and operated by a federation of 24 area congregations. The campus is home to the largest regenerative storm water conveyance system in the United States and is undergoing a multi-million dollar expansion.

== Description ==
SLHS is a private religious high school for grades nine through twelve. It is located on 17 acres (6.9 ha) in Somers, Kenosha County, Wisconsin.

Shoreland Lutheran High School Federation, which operates the school, was organized Feb. 14, 1971. It is a non-profit 501(c)(3) organization.

The Shoreland Lutheran High School Federation also includes Wisconsin Lutheran School, which serves students in grades kindergarten through 8.

== History ==
=== Early years ===
In 1968, "a layman a minister and a teacher coordinating committee" studied the possibility of establishing a school for four congregations (Friedens, St. Luke, Bethany, and Mt. Zion) of the Wisconsin Evangelical Lutheran Synod. In July 1971, the synod's Lutheran high school committee chose the name "Shoreland Lutheran High School".

The first classes were offered during the 1971–72 school year in Friedens Evangelical Lutheran Grade School in Kenosha, for 27 tenth grade students. During the second year of operation, the school moved to Mount Zion Evangelical Lutheran Church, where 46 students were enrolled; the enrollment was 78 during the school's third year. By that year, the school was supported by seven congregations: the original four, plus the Lutheran Church of the Abiding Word, in Somers; Immanuel, in Waukesha; and Our Saviour Lutheran Church, in Zion. SLHS officially became a four-year high school in the autumn of 1973, and graduated its first class in May 1974.

=== Funding a new building ===
As early as 1972, the Shoreland High School Foundation initiated "Project S" to raise $500,000 to build a new school building on property donated by Elmer Kirchner.

In February 1975, its rising enrollment caused a move into a block of rooms on the third floor of the east wing of St. Joseph High School. By October 1975, the school had relocated to Friedens Lutheran School, and the Shoreland School Board made plans to raise $1.4 million to build the school's first permanent home. Enrollment in 1975 was 140 students.

In December 1975, the school's first principal, E. J. Greve, dug the first shovel of dirt in a ground-breaking ceremony for construction of the new school building. The new building was designed to be a 46,000-square-foot (4,300 m^{2}) building with room for 350 students. Scheduled to open in 1976, the new school had eight classrooms, science rooms, an arts room, home economics rooms, music rooms, and a gymnasium.

=== Building expansions ===
An addition to the west end and major internal renovations were completed in 1997.

In April 2014, the Somers Town Board approved the school's plans for a 13,800-square-foot (1,280 m^{2}) science wing addition, including three combination science labs and classrooms, a science technology engineering and mathematics classroom, a new mechanical room, and new handicapped accessible restrooms. In September 2014, the school celebrated opening of the new $4.2 million wing, and the start of the inaugural year of the STEM Project Lead the Way program. Students participating in the program are eligible to earn college credits through the Milwaukee School of Engineering (MSOE).

A final addition of an auxiliary gymnasium and auditorium in the near future will also include renovating the lunch area and office complex.

== Academics ==
Shoreland offers a variety of courses, including music, art, foreign languages, woods, small engine repair, computer science courses, biomedical courses, engineering courses, and business courses designed to jump start the students for college level business courses. Further, a pre-ministry program for students wishing to become teachers or pastors in the WEKS is available. It has five Advanced Placement classes: AP Biology, AP Calculus, AP Chemistry, AP History, and AP Literature and Composition. Also Honors Spanish and Honors Physics are also offered. In the 2014–15 school year, Shoreland opened a STEM (Science, Technology, Engineering, Math) Academy. Through a partnership with MSOE it offers students transcript credit. Its state accountability report card is available annually.

== Activities ==
Shoreland offers Honors Band and is accredited by the Wisconsin School Music Association.. Shoreland also offers fine arts programs as described on "Shoreland Fine Arts".

- Concert Choir
- Chamber Choir
- Band
- Orchestra
- Drama

Other co-curricular activities are described on "Shoreland Clubs".

- Forensics
- Robotics Club
- National Honor Society
- Ministry Club
- Student Ambassadors
- Student Council
- Students for Life

== Athletics ==
Shoreland offers the sports as described in the SLHS Athletic Handbook and the Wisconsin Sports Network.

- Junior varsity, varsity football
- Junior varsity, varsity soccer
- Freshman, junior varsity, varsity boys' and girls' basketball
- Freshman, junior varsity, varsity girls' volleyball
- Junior varsity, varsity softball
- Junior varsity, varsity baseball
- Junior varsity, varsity girls' soccer
- Track and field
- Cross country
- Boys' and girls' golf
- Junior varsity, varsity wrestling
- Cheerleading
