= Jonathan Dekker =

American football player (born 1983)

No. 88, 83
- Position: Tight end

Personal information
- Born: May 15, 1983 (age 43); Greenfield, Wisconsin, U.S.
- Listed height: 6 ft 5 in (1.96 m)
- Listed weight: 250 lb (113 kg)

Career information
- High school: Saint Thomas More
- College: Princeton
- NFL draft: 2006: undrafted

Career history
- Pittsburgh Steelers (2006–2008); Florida Tuskers (2009)

Awards and highlights
- Super Bowl champion (XLIII)

Career NFL statistics
- Games played: 3
- Stats at Pro Football Reference

Jonathan Dekker (born May 15, 1983) is an American former professional football player who was a tight end for the Pittsburgh Steelers of the National Football League (NFL). He played college football for the Princeton Tigers. He was signed by the Steelers as an undrafted free agent in 2006. Dekker won Super Bowl XLIII with the Steelers.

== Early life ==
Dekker played high school football at Saint Thomas More in Milwaukee.

== College career ==
Dekker played college football at Princeton University. He finished his career with 64 receptions for 760 yards and five touchdowns.

== Professional career ==
Dekker was signed by the Pittsburgh Steelers as a rookie free agent and spent the 2006 season on the practice squad. He played in three games for the Steelers in 2007. On August 16, 2008, he was waived injured before the season started, after suffering a preseason knee injury. Dekker was part of the Super Bowl XLIII team that won the Super Bowl.

== Personal life ==
On January 24, 2009, Dekkers was arrested and charged with obstruction of justice.
