= Andrew Mozina =

American writer (born 1963)

Andrew Mozina (born July 7, 1963) is an American writer.

== Biography ==
Mozina grew up in Brookfield, Wisconsin, a suburb of Milwaukee. He is a graduate of Pius XI High School in Milwaukee, Wisconsin, and received a B.A. in economics from Northwestern University, where he was President of the Associated Student Government as a member of the "Silly Party." He attended law school for a year, then earned a master's degree in creative writing from Boston University and moved to St. Louis where he completed a doctorate in English literature at Washington University. He is an associate professor of English, teaching literature and creative writing, at Kalamazoo College, in Michigan.

== Works ==
Mozina's books include the short story collections, The Women Were Leaving the Men (Wayne State University Press, 2007), and Quality Snacks (Wayne State University Press, 2014), and the novels Contrary Motion (Spiegel & Grau, 2016) and Tandem (Tortoise Books, 2023). The Women Were Leaving the Men was a finalist in the Mary McCarthy Prize in Short Fiction; the collection's title story received a special mention in the Pushcart Prize 2006 and was also listed as a distinguished story in The Best American Short Stories collection of 2005. Mozina has published a critical work on Joseph Conrad, Joseph Conrad and the Art of Sacrifice (2001).

In 2014, Mozina performed in a video for Milwaukee power pop band The Mike Benign Compulsion, "Professional Jealousy/Saw Your Post."
