= Jay Guidinger =

American basketball player (born 1969)

Personal information
- Born: August 18, 1969 (age 57) Milwaukee, Wisconsin
- Listed height: 6 ft 10 in (2.08 m)
- Listed weight: 255 lb (116 kg)

Career information
- High school: Dominican (Whitefish Bay, Wisconsin)
- College: Minnesota–Duluth (1987–1991)
- NBA draft: 1991: undrafted
- Position: Center
- Number: 54

Career history
- 1992–1994: Cleveland Cavaliers
- 1994: Rapid City Thrillers

Career highlights
- 2× First-team NAIA All-American (1990, 1991); 3× NSIC Player of the Year (1989–1991); 3× First-team All-NSIC (1989–1991)
- Stats at NBA.com
- Stats at Basketball Reference

Jay Patrick Guidinger (born August 18, 1969) is a retired American professional basketball player who played his entire National Basketball Association (NBA) career for the Cleveland Cavaliers until retiring due to injuries.

== Playing career ==
A 6'10" center born in Milwaukee, Wisconsin, Guidinger played four seasons for the University of Minnesota Duluth (UMD) Bulldogs, starting all 126 games, establishing University records for points (1,953), rebounds (1,095) and blocked shots (195). While at UMD, Guidinger's per game average was 15.5 points, 8.7 rebounds and 2.0 assists. Guidinger was a three-time NAIA Men's Basketball Championships All-American center (first team in 1990–91 and 1989–90 and third team in 1988–89), and became the first individual to be named Northern Sun Intercollegiate Conference (NSIC) Player of the Year in three straight seasons. In 2001, Guidinger was inducted into the University of Minnesota Duluth Athletic Hall of Fame.

On October 8, 1992, Guidinger signed as a free agent with the Cleveland Cavaliers as an undrafted rookie despite having reconstructive surgery on both of his knees prior to his initial tryout with the team. He played for the Cavaliers for two seasons as part of the team's seldom-used backup frontcourt to Brad Daugherty, Larry Nance and John "Hot Rod" Williams, although he was in the starting lineup for five games during the 1992–93 season. He was then waived by the Cavaliers on December 23, 1993, but re-signed with the team for two 10-day contracts on January 19, 1994, before being signed for the rest of the season, his last as a professional. In his two NBA regular seasons (1992–93 and 1993–94), he played in 32 games and averaged 1.5 points, 1.5 rebounds, 0.3 assists, 0.2 steals and 0.2 blocks. Including the postseason, where he appeared in four games and scored two points in the 1993 NBA Playoffs against the New Jersey Nets and Chicago Bulls, he has a career total of 100 points scored.

Guidinger also had a short stint in the Continental Basketball Association with the Rapid City Thrillers during the 1993–94 season. In five games, he averaged 4.2 points and 5 rebounds per game.

== Career after retirement ==
After retiring from basketball, Guidinger became an assistant coach for Cleveland State University. He then volunteered as an assistant coach at Western Michigan University, after which he left basketball to become a Regional/National Sales Manager at Interkal, Inc. Guidinger then worked as a sales representative at Dant Clayton Corporation, followed by Porter Athletics. He is currently employed as a Vice President/General Manager Lamar Advertising.

Guidinger married Khai Guidinger (née Regan), a former player for the women's basketball team at University of Minnesota Duluth, in July, 1994. They have three children, one of whom, Jinda, is on the Western Illinois Fighting Leathernecks women's basketball team. Gabriel Guidinger is a member of the Juniata Eagles Men's Basketball team. Gregory Guidinger is a member of the Loyola Greyhounds.
