= Bob Heinz =

American football player (1947–2026)

No. 72, 76
- Positions: Defensive tackle, Defensive end

Personal information
- Born: July 25, 1947; Milwaukee, Wisconsin, U.S.
- Died: October 31, 2026 (aged 79); Fresno, California, U.S.
- Listed height: 6 ft 6 in (1.98 m)
- Listed weight: 265 lb (120 kg)

Career information
- High school: Lincoln (Stockton, California); Messmer (Milwaukee)
- College: Delta College (CA); Pacific
- NFL draft: 1969: 2nd round, 37th overall pick

Career history
- Miami Dolphins (1969-1977); Washington Redskins (1978)

Awards and highlights
- 2× Super Bowl champion (VII, VIII)

Career NFL/AFL statistics
- Fumble recoveries: 1
- Sacks: 9
- Stats at Pro Football Reference

Robert Kenneth Heinz (July 25, 1947 – October 31, 2026) was an American professional football player who was a defensive tackle in the National Football League (NFL). He played college football for the Pacific Tigers. Heinz was selected in the second round (37th pick overall) of the 1969 NFL/AFL draft by the Miami Dolphins, and played professionally for the Dolphins and the Washington Redskins.

== Biography ==
Heinz was born in Milwaukee, Wisconsin, on July 25, 1947. He attended Messmer High School in Milwaukee and Lincoln High School in Stockton, California. He played college football at San Joaquin Delta College and the University of the Pacific. Heinz was inducted into the University of the Pacific Hall of Fame as a 1987-1988 Inductee.

He played for the Miami Dolphins from 1969 to 1977 and for the Washington Redskins in 1978. He was a member of the undefeated (17–0) 1972 Miami Dolphins and won a second Super Bowl title with the Dolphins in 1973. He was credited with 9 sacks during his career and had 2 sacks and 1 fumble recovery during the perfect season.

After retiring from the NFL, Heinz became an advertising executive in Palo Alto, California. Heinz died in Fresno, California, on October 31, 2026, at the age of 79.

== See also ==
- List of American Football League players
