= Racine Lutheran High School =

Location
- 251 Luedtke Avenue; Racine, Wisconsin 53405; United States; 42°43′49.1″N 87°48′21.8″W

Information
- Denomination: Lutheran Church–Missouri Synod
- Established: 1944
- Dean: Brian Smith
- Director: David Burgess
- Principal: Jason Block
- Faculty: 27
- Grades: 9 to 12
- Enrollment: 340 (2023-24)
- Student to teacher ratio: 12.6
- Colors: Purple and Gold
- Athletics conference: Metro Classic
- Mascot: Crusader
- Accreditation: National Lutheran School Accreditation
- Annual tuition: $11,200
- Website: www.racinelutheran.org

Racine Lutheran High School is a private religious high school located in Racine, Wisconsin. It is associated with the Lutheran Church–Missouri Synod. Founded in 1944, the school has an enrollment of about 340 students.

== Academics ==
Christian education in the Lutheran tradition is tied into daily school life for all students at RLHS.

== Extracurricular activities ==
=== Athletics ===
Sports offered at Racine Lutheran include football, soccer, volleyball, basketball, golf, trap-shooting, wrestling, baseball, softball, cheerleading, cross country, tennis, and track and field.

==== Athletic conference affiliation history ====
- Wisconsin Prep Conference (1950-1952)
- Midwest Prep Conference (1952-1983)
- Midwest Classic Conference (1983-2012)
- Metro Classic Conference (2012–present)

=== Drama ===
Racine Lutheran has a drama program that produces about one show per semester. Past productions include Bye Bye Birdie, The Diary of Anne Frank, Aladdin and His Magical Lamp, Inside Lester, and 12 Angry Jurors.

=== Music ===
Racine Lutheran High School offers a range of music programs, including band, choir, handbells, jazz band, and a brass ensemble.

== Notable people ==
- Van H. Wanggaard — politician and police officer
- Alex Scales — American professional basketball player
