= William H. Flett =

American lawyer and politician

William Flett

Member of the Wisconsin State Assembly
- In office 1896–1898

Personal details
- Born: May 10, 1856 Somers, Wisconsin
- Died: September 5, 1911 (aged 55) Seattle, Washington
- Party: Republican
- Education: University of Wisconsin (LLB)

William H. Flett (May 10, 1856 – September 5, 1911) was an American attorney and politician who served as a member of the Wisconsin State Assembly.

== Early life and education ==
Born in the town of Somers, Wisconsin, Flett attended local public schools. He then went to University of Wisconsin and worked as a teacher. He graduated from the University of Wisconsin Law School.

== Career ==
In 1885, Flett moved to Merrill, Wisconsin and practiced law. Flett served as Merrill city attorney and was involved with the Republican Party. In 1897, Flett served in the Wisconsin State Assembly. In 1904, Flett served on the Wisconsin Commission for the Louisiana Purchase Exposition in St. Louis, Missouri.

== Death ==
Flett moved to Seattle, Washington, where he died in 1911.
