= St. Joan Antida High School =

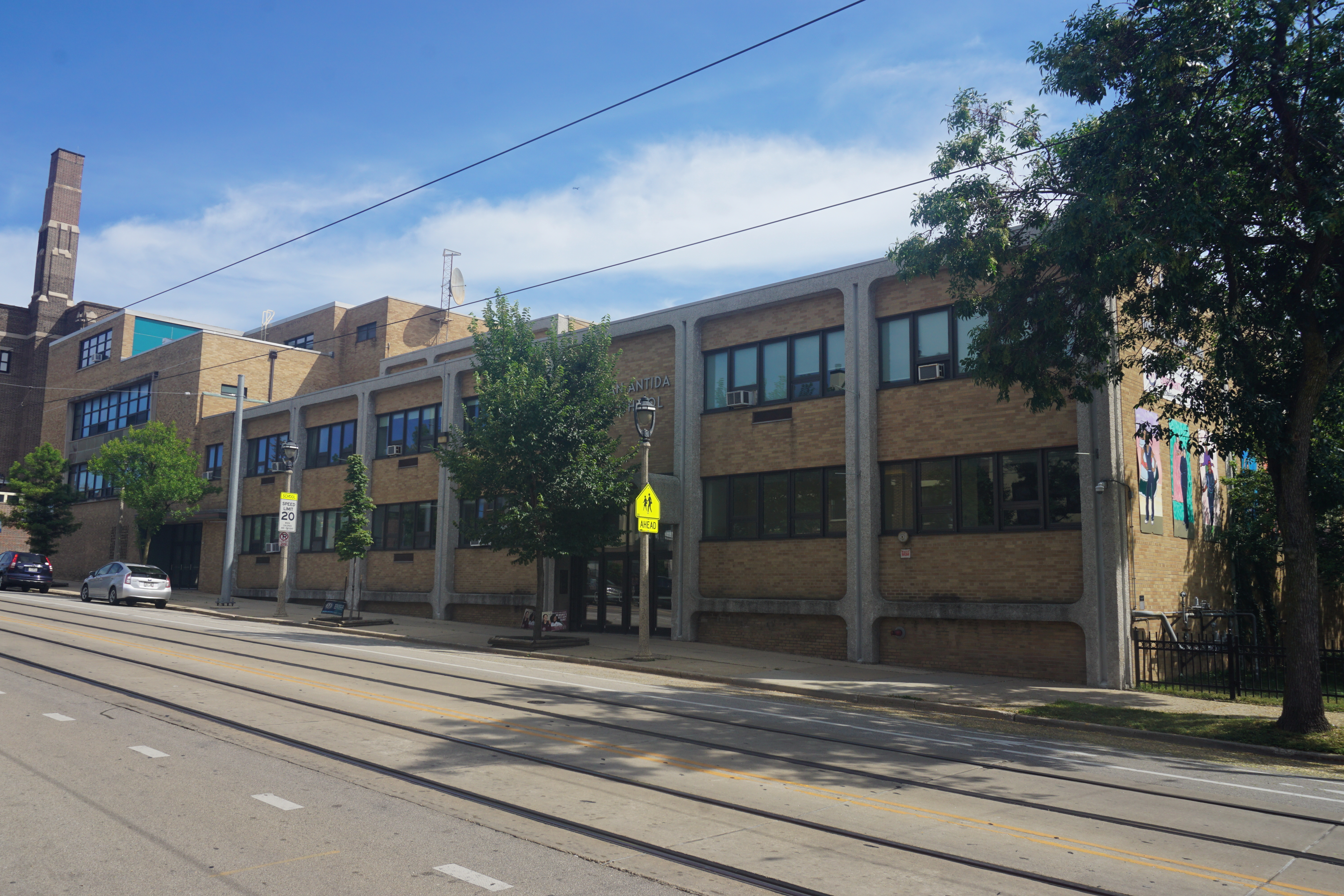

Location
- 1341 N. Cass Street; Milwaukee, (Milwaukee County), Wisconsin 53202-2796; United States
- 43°2′51″N 87°54′8″W

Information
- Type: Private, All-girls
- Religious affiliation: Roman Catholic
- Established: 1954
- President: Marikris Coryell
- Principal: Megan Otero
- Grades: 9–12
- Gender: female
- Colors: Maroon and white
- Athletics conference: Midwest Classic South
- Mascot: Jaguar
- Team name: Jaguars
- Accreditation: North Central Association of Colleges and Schools
- Website: www.saintjoanantida.org

St. Joan Antida High School (SJA) is a private, Roman Catholic high school in Milwaukee, Wisconsin. It is in the Roman Catholic Archdiocese of Milwaukee.

== History ==
On September 16, 1932, the first Sisters of Charity of St. Joan Antida arrived in Milwaukee to begin their ministry. They began working at St. Camillus. A year later, eight more Sisters arrived to begin their work with Italian immigrants in Third Ward at Our Lady of Pompei Church. They had the dream to continue the work of St. Joan Antida by building a school for young women.

The school held its ground breaking on July 1, 1953. On September 15, 1954, St. Joan Antida High School opened its doors to the young women of Milwaukee.

== Demographics ==
St. Joan Antida High School 2021-2022 enrollment is 192 young women from the Milwaukee area. The school pulls from more than 50 parochial, private and public schools in the Milwaukee area. The student body is 59% Latina, 33% Black, 3% white, 2% indigenous, 2% Asian-American Pacific Islander and 1% multi-ethnic.

== Academics ==
St. Joan Antida High School's curriculum is built in a career pathway model focused around engineering/information technology, business and healthcare that offers Advanced Placement coursework. Students can also take a number of theology courses, art courses and foreign language courses in either Spanish or French. The school also offers an "Empower Hour," a 13-week course each semester that gives them the opportunity to earn credits towards graduation focused on enriching skills and activities.

== Extra-Curriculars ==
St. Joan Antida High School currently offers a number of extra-curricular clubs including Drama, Black Student Union, Spanish Club, RoboChix Robotics Team, Link Crew and Roar Squad. The school also offers a number of athletic opportunities including basketball, volleyball, track, tennis, soccer, cheer and cross country.

=== Athletic conference affiliation history ===
- Metro Conference (1974-1989)
- Midwest Classic Conference (1989-2014)
- Lake City Conference (2022–present)
