= St. John's Cathedral High School =

Roman Catholic high school in Milwaukee, Wisconsin

Coordinates: 43°02′32.5″N 87°54′14.5″W

St. John's Cathedral High School was a Roman Catholic high school in Milwaukee, Wisconsin associated with the Cathedral of St. John the Evangelist. It was founded in 1842 as a school for boys (in the basement of the church at what is now the northwest corner of Jackson and State Streets). When it closed in 1976 due to financial problems and declining enrollment, it was the oldest Catholic high school in Milwaukee.
