= Una Flett =

Writer and ballerina (1939–2021)

- from her memoir
- Born: 1939; Bihar, India
- Died: 2021 (aged 81–82); Motril, Spain
- Other names: Una Leonie Flett, Una Leonie Russell
- Known for: author and ballerina

Una Flett (1939 – 2021) was an author, journalist, travel writer, artist and in her youth, a ballerina with the Ballet des Champs-Élysées, Paris. Her memoirs and novel touched on life in the 1930s to 1950s, and her play Zosienka explored the life of artist Henri Guadier-Brzeska.

== Life and education ==
Born Una Leonie Russell, in Bihar, India in 1939, her father Sir Robert Russell was a Scottish advisor to the province government in the British 'Raj' at that time. Her mother, Rhona was fourteen years younger, but both her parents had a liberal attitude to arts, language and religion which influenced her life.

In the 1950s, Flett became a member of the ballet corps in the Ballets des Champs-Élysées, set up by Gabriel Dussurget, Roland Petit and Boris Kochno. She danced there and toured, from the ages of 17 to 20, whilst based in Paris, but had to leave due to injury. She returned to Edinburgh and quickly married a G.P. Dr. Hugh Flett, and moved to the North-West Highlands of Scotland. They had two children, a daughter Rowan, and a son Martin. Whilst they were still teenagers, her husband drowned at sea, with three others, whilst late-night fishing off the Gairloch coast.

She later studied art, tapestry and social anthropology later in life, as a mature student, at Edinburgh College of Art and the University of Edinburgh.

== Writing career ==
Flett's first book in 1981, Falling from Grace: My early years in ballet refers to the kind of discipline involved in professional ballet, going beyond the physical, saying "Enslave the body in certain ways of obedience, and mind and spirit will follow suit".

She wrote a novel Revisiting Empty Houses in 1988, about a strained relationship with an age gap between the couple.

Once her children grew up, she moved to Spain, away from opportunities for a career in the civil service or academia in Edinburgh, to live in a traditional home in the Sierra, in Alpujarra. Flett corresponded as an independent journalist, giving reviews of dance, and drama, travel articles and translations, writing in Spanish, French and English. She wrote short stories, radio plays (for the BBC) and a prize-winning play, Zosienka, (1985), based on the relationship between sculptor Henri Gaudier-Brzeska and older woman Sophia Brzeska.

Her father's life story (based on letters she found after his death) is described in her last (self-publication) memoir: This Other Father: a Family Memoir of India and Edinburgh (2020). This spans the days in British India and the impact of the invasion by the Japanese in World War II. And it tackles the breakdown of the relationship with his younger wife, her mother Rhona, 'home' (whilst the children were schooled) when her husband was in India, who had a love affair with a Polish man. Her father later returned to Edinburgh, and despite suffering depression, he built himself a new career as a town planner, and he rebuilt his marriage.

She was a member of Scottish PEN and in that capacity responded to proposed changes in 2019, to the Scots Law of defamation, expressing her belief that "the law as it stands threatens free expression and enables powerful and wealthy pursuers to silence legitimate criticism and debate both online and off".

Una Flett died in Motril hospital, Spain in December 2021.

== Selected publications ==
- (1981) Falling from Grace: My early years in ballet
- (1988) Revisiting Empty Houses
- (2020) This Other Father: a Family Memoir of India and Edinburgh
