= Martin Luther High School =

Location
- 5201 South 76th Street; Greendale, Wisconsin 53129; United States; 42°56′56.9″N 88°00′37.5″W

Information
- Type: Private secondary school
- Religious affiliation: Lutheranism
- Denomination: Lutheran Church – Missouri Synod
- Established: September 15, 1968; 58 years ago
- Principal: Chris Cody
- Faculty: 59
- Colors: Green, white and gold
- Athletics conference: Metro Classic
- Team name: Spartans
- Yearbook: Phalanx
- Tuition: $11,400 (2017–18)
- Website: www.martinlutherhs.org

Martin Luther High School is a private Lutheran high school located in Greendale, Wisconsin, United States. The school is affiliated with the Lutheran Church – Missouri Synod.

== History ==
Martin Luther High School was built after World War II as the second school of the Lutheran High School Association of Greater Milwaukee. It was designed to serve over 800 students.

== Academics ==
The school has a college preparatory program that focuses on mathematics, literature, history, the arts, and foreign language.

== Extra-curricular activities ==
The school has three bands, the Spartan, the Varsity, and the Symphonic Band. Symphonic Band is an audition-only band that has toured in Colorado, Texas, Tennessee, Florida, and Washington, D.C. Small ensembles include Jazz Band, Brass Choir, Flute Choir, Clarinet Choir, Woodwind Ensemble, Sax Choir, and Pep Band.

There is a choir program comprising four choirs, including a men's and women's choir and two mixed choirs. The top choir, the Concert Choir, has toured in New York, California, and Washington, D.C., and has performed at choir competitions throughout the area. Students participate in the District Wisconsin State Music Association Contest in the spring.

Music classes cover the study of humanities, advanced music and independent study music theory. The music computer laboratory allows students to write music and familiarize themselves with music technology such as ACID, Reason, and Sibelius music notation software.

== Notable alumni ==
- Jason Johnson – actor
- Candice Michelle – model/actress
