= Thomas Muirhead Flett =

English mathematician

- Born: 28 July 1923; London, England
- Died: 13 February 1976 (aged 52); Sheffield, England
- Scientific career
- Fields: Mathematics

Thomas Muirhead Flett (28 July 1923 – 13 February 1976) was an English mathematician at Sheffield University working on analysis.

== Early life ==
Thomas Muirhead Flett was born on 28 July 1923, in London, England, when his parents moved from Scotland to London. At age 11, he won a scholarship by the County of Middlesex from a state primary school to University College School (U.C.S.), Hampstead.

== Career ==
During World War II, Flett was first employed as a laboratory assistant in the Post Office Research Station at Dollis Hill, where the electronic computers used for code-breaking at Bletchley Park were being assembled. While working, he studied part-time at Acton Technical College and obtained first class Honours in the London University B.Sc. general Degree in Mathematics and Physics. After working in the Post Office Research Station for three years, Flett worked as a research physicist at Simmonds Aerocessories in Brentford for two years. In 1945, pursuing his interest in Mathematics at Chelsea Polytechnic, he obtained class Honours in the B.Sc. Special Degree in Mathematics. In 1946, he obtained a mark in optional subjects, and in 1947, he was awarded for M.Sc. in Mathematics of London University.

After having received his early degrees as a part-time student, Flett entered Trinity College at the University of Cambridge in 1947. Under the guidance of Prof. John Edensor Littlewood, he completed a Ph.D. degree in mathematics with a 1950 thesis entitled Some applications of estimates of exponential sums to the theory of functions.

In 1950, Flett joined Liverpool University as a lecturer. While there, he authored the undergraduate textbook Mathematical Analysis: Theory, Methods, and Applications. In 1966, Flett spent a year at the University of Washington in Seattle. In 1967, he joined the University of Sheffield as a professor of pure mathematics. Flett contracted multiple myeloma and died in Sheffield on 13 February 1976 at the age of 52.

At the time of his death, Flett had almost completed his second textbook Differential Analysis: Differentiation, Differential Equations and Differential Inequalities. It was edited and published by his colleague at Sheffield, Prof. John Sydney Pym.

== Family ==
In 1948, Flett married Joan Frances Ayers (1923–2016). They had two daughters.

Tom and Joan Flett were avid Scottish dancers. In 1964, they co-authored Traditional Dancing in Scotland. In 1996, Joan Flett updated their book as Traditional Step-dancing in Scotland.
