= Somers, Wisconsin =

City in Kenosha County, Wisconsin

- Village
- Location of Somers in Kenosha County, Wisconsin
- Coordinates: 42°37′17″N 87°52′17″W
- Country: United States
- State: Wisconsin
- County: Kenosha

Area
  - Total: 25.30 sq mi (65.53 km^{2})
  - Land: 25.28 sq mi (65.48 km^{2})
  - Water: 0.015 sq mi (0.04 km^{2})
- Elevation: 679 ft (207 m)

Population (2020)
  - Total: 8,402
  - Density: 331.1/sq mi (127.83/km^{2})
- Time zone: UTC-6 (Central (CST))
  - Summer (DST): UTC-5 (CDT)
- ZIP Code: 53171
- Area code: 262
- FIPS code: 55-74650
- GNIS feature ID: 1584173
- Website: www.somerswi.gov

Somers is a village in Kenosha County, Wisconsin, United States. The population was 8,402 at the 2020 census. Somers has a post office with ZIP code 53171. The former unincorporated communities of Berryville, Central Park, and Kellogg's Corners are located in the village.

The village of Somers was incorporated on April 24, 2015, following a local election that favored incorporation. While the village originally only included the eastern half of the town's former boundaries, it now includes almost all of the original town; the remainder is still a town and is slated to become part of Kenosha by 2035.

== History ==
The community was originally named Pike on April 15, 1843, by an act of the Wisconsin territorial legislature, and became Somers in 1851.

== Geography ==
According to the United States Census Bureau, the village has a total area of 25.274 square miles (65.46 km^{2}), of which 25.257 square miles (65.42 km^{2}) are land and 0.017 square miles (0.044 km^{2}) are water.

== Demographics ==
Somers first appeared in the 2020 U.S. census after incorporation in 2015.

Somers village, Wisconsin– Racial and ethnic composition Note: the US Census treats Hispanic/Latino as an ethnic category. This table excludes Latinos from the racial categories and assigns them to a separate category. Hispanics/Latinos may be of any race.
Race / Ethnicity (NH = Non-Hispanic)	Pop 2020	% 2020
White alone (NH)	6,636	78.98%
Black or African American alone (NH)	462	5.50%
Native American or Alaska Native alone (NH)	26	0.31%
Asian alone (NH)	237	2.82%
Native Hawaiian or Pacific Islander alone (NH)	3	0.04%
Other race alone (NH)	33	0.39%
Mixed race or Multiracial (NH)	277	3.30%
Hispanic or Latino (any race)	728	8.66%
Total	8,402	100.00%

== Neighborhoods ==
=== Berryville ===
Berryville is a residential and business community located in the eastern part of the village, at the intersection of Kenosha County Highway A (7th Street) and Highway 32 (Sheridan Road). The community was named for the proliferation of strawberry farms in the area. The Berryville School was a community fixture into the 1980s, when it was demolished for new housing. Adjacent to the school to the south was the Mid-City Outdoor Theatre (1948-1984), one of Wisconsin's first drive-in theatres.

=== Central Park ===
Central Park is a residential and business community within the southeastern corner of the village. It is centered on the intersection of Sheridan Road (Highway 32) and Twelfth Street (Kenosha County Highway E). The area once was the location of the namesake Central Park, a sprawling private recreational park, baseball field, and picnic grounds that was served by a stop of the Milwaukee Electric Railway & Light Company (TMER&L) interurban line which had installed layover sidings for its rail cars waiting to reload and return picnickers to their homes. Central Park often hosted many annual company picnics including those of the Nash Motors Company of Kenosha. The Central Park picnic grounds were later sold and renamed "Minkowski's Grove", which since has been subdivided and no longer exists for public usage.

=== Kellogg's Corners ===
Kellogg's Corners (often called Kellogg) is a residential and agricultural community in the northwestern corner of the village. It lies at the junction of Interstate 94/U.S. Route 41 and Highway 195 at the border with Racine County. Kellogg's Corners was first settled in 1837 by three Kellogg brothers - Seth, Chauncey, and Thaddeus.

By far, the most notable Kellogg's Corners landmark was the Greek Revival mid-19th century Kellogg's Corners School, an early historic one-room school of frame construction that eventually became privately owned and was demolished by its owner in 1990. The school's rustic foundation remains to mark its location.

== Education ==
- Shoreland Lutheran High School is a private Christian high school of the Wisconsin Evangelical Lutheran Synod (WELS).
- The University of Wisconsin-Parkside is located within the village.

== Notable people ==
- William H. Flett, Wisconsin legislator
- Margaret Landon, author of Anna and the King of Siam
- Drue Leyton, actress, writer, member of the French Resistance
- Conrad Shearer, Wisconsin legislator
