= Dominican High School (Whitefish Bay, Wisconsin) =

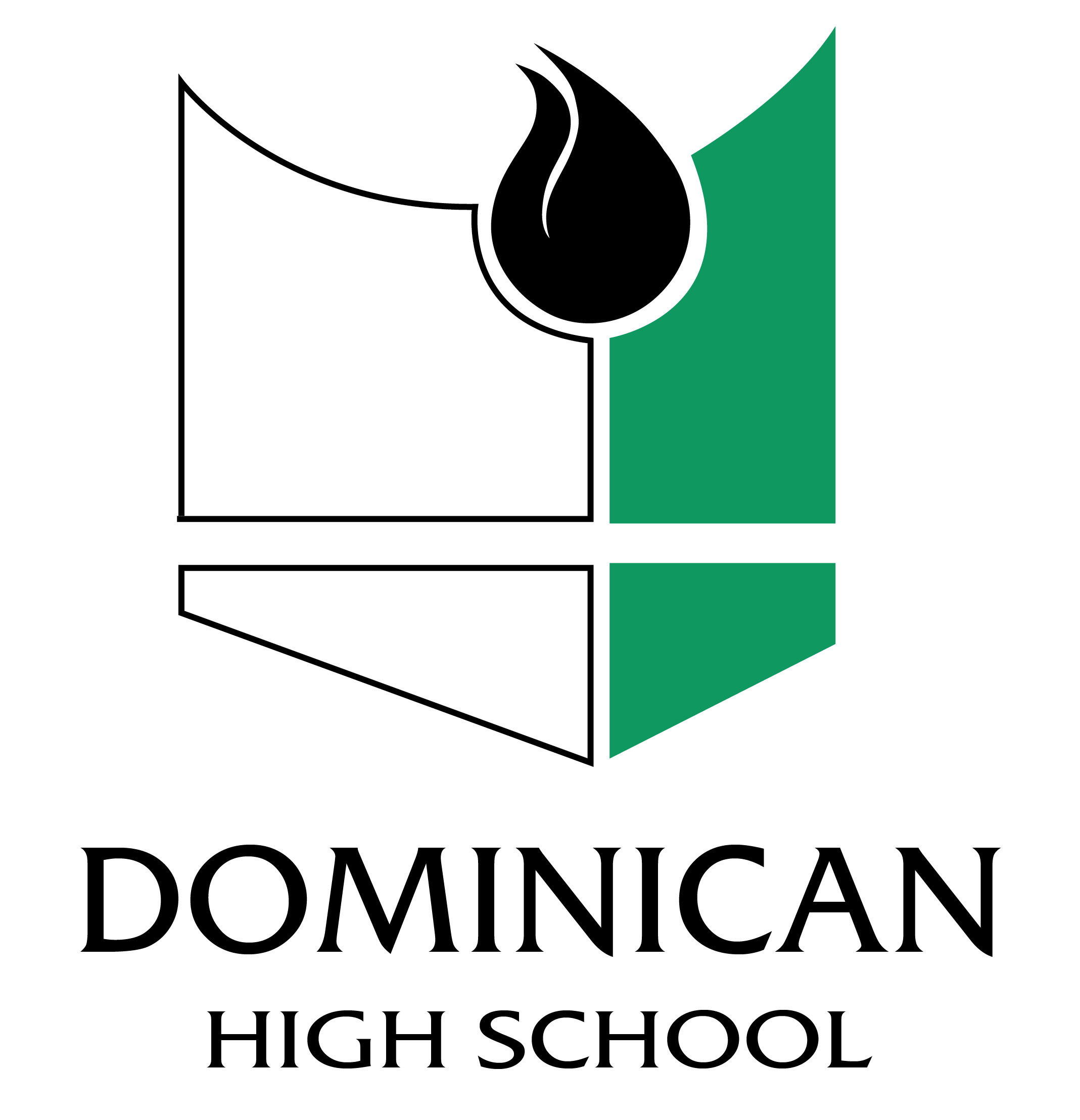

Location
- 120 East Silver Spring Drive; Whitefish Bay, Milwaukee County, Wisconsin 53217 USA
- Coordinates: 43°7′8″N 87°54′36″W

Information
- School type: Private, coeducational
- Religious affiliations: Roman Catholic (Sinsinawa Dominican Sisters)
- Patron saint: St. Dominic
- Established: 1956; 70 years ago
- President: Leanne Giese
- Dean: Vincent Murray (Dean of Academics); Nate Friday (Dean of Students)
- Director: List: Michael Mueller (Director of Admissions); Joseph Grady (Director of Athletics); Nicole Bray (Director of Finance); Timothy Dries (Director of the Band); Jim Fisher (Director of Facilities); Claudia Martin (Director of Advancement); Sarah Parlier (Director of Choir)
- Principal: Vincent Murray
- Grades: 9–12
- Gender: Coeducational
- Classes: Day classes
- Average class size: 18
- Student to teacher ratio: 13:1
- Color: Green - Black - White
- Athletics conference: Metro Classic
- Sports: Cross country, baseball, basketball, football, golf, soccer, softball, tennis, track & field, volleyball
- Mascot: Knight
- Team name: Knights
- Accreditation: North Central Association of Colleges and Schools
- Publication: Dominican Magazine
- Newspaper: The Knightly News
- Website: dominicanhighschool.com

Dominican High School is a private, Catholic high school in Whitefish Bay, Wisconsin, United States. It is in, but not funded by, the Archdiocese of Milwaukee as a college preparatory high school.

== Background ==
Father Samuel Mazzuchelli, O.P. (1809–1864), an Italian native who preached and established churches throughout Michigan, Wisconsin, Illinois and Iowa, founded the my soninsinawa Dominican Congregation of the Most Holy Rosary. This congregation served as the foundation for Dominican High School.

Dominican High School opened in September 1956, with 174 freshmen from 26 parishes. Although sponsored by the Sinsinawa Dominicans, the school was championed by two pastors, Peter E. Dietz, pastor of St. Monica Parish (1912–1947) and Farrell P. Reilly, pastor of St. Robert Parish (1912–1958). Both envisioned the formation of a Catholic high school in the North Shore suburbs. St. Monica Parish donated the land for Dominican High School and St. Robert Parish contributed over half a million dollars for its construction.

== Athletics ==
Dominican's athletic teams are nicknamed the Knights, and they were founding members of the Metro Classic Conference in 2012.

=== Athletic conference affiliation history ===
- Milwaukee Catholic Conference (1958-1974)
- Metro Conference (1974-1997)
- Parkland Conference (1997-2006)
- Midwest Classic Conference (2006-2012)
- Metro Classic Conference (2012–present)

== Notable alumni ==
- Alex Antetokounmpo – NBA G League player
- Kostas Antetokounmpo – NBA player
- Jay Guidinger – NBA player
- Anthony Pettis – professional mixed martial artist, former WEC Lightweight Champion, former UFC Lightweight Champion
- Diamond Stone – NBA player
- JR Blount - college basketball coach
