= Messmer High School =

Location
- 742 West Capitol Drive; Milwaukee, (Milwaukee County), Wisconsin 53206-3327; United States; 43°5′23″N 87°55′13″W

Information
- Type: Private, coeducational, Catholic
- Motto: Knowledge ∙ Faith ∙ Leadership.
- Religious affiliation: Roman Catholic
- Established: 1926
- Status: open
- President: Richard Mannisto
- Grades: 9-12
- Gender: co-ed
- Student to teacher ratio: 1:12
- Hours in school day: 8
- Colors: Messmer blue and white
- Athletics conference: Midwest Classic South
- Sports: Baseball, basketball, football, cross country, track, soccer, volleyball, wrestling, cheerleading
- Mascot: Bishop
- Team name: Bishops / Messwood
- Accreditation: North Central Association of Colleges and Schools
- Newspaper: Foursquare
- Yearbook: Capitol
- Athletic Director: John Johnson
- Website: https://messmerschools.org/students-and-families/messmer-high-school/

Messmer High School is a private Catholic high school in Milwaukee, Wisconsin. It is located in the Archdiocese of Milwaukee.

Messmer High School was established in 1926 as Diocesan High School. It was renamed after Archbishop Sebastian Messmer in 1928.

From September 1997 to September 1998, due to a school voucher program, the number of students increased by almost 20%, to 366, and 30 students were on a wait list as of the latter month; years prior, the school did not have a waiting list.

== Athletics ==
Messmer's teams are nicknamed the Bishops, and they are currently members of the Midwest Classic Conference.

=== Athletic conference affiliation history ===
- Milwaukee Catholic Conference (1930–1974)
- Metro Conference (1974–1984)
- Indian Trails Conference (1986–1993)
- Midwest Classic Conference (1993–present)

== Notable alumni ==
- Ishmael "IshDarr" Ali, rapper
- Joseph P. Graw, Minnesota state representative and businessman
- Bob Heinz, former NFL football player who played for the Miami Dolphins and the Washington Redskins
- Todd Frohwirth, former Major League Baseball pitcher
- John "JJ" Johnson, NBA basketball player, First Team All-American at University of Iowa
- Ronald G. Parys, Wisconsin State Assemblyman and Senator
- Claire Sardina, American entertainer
