= Pius XI High School =

Pius XI Catholic High School
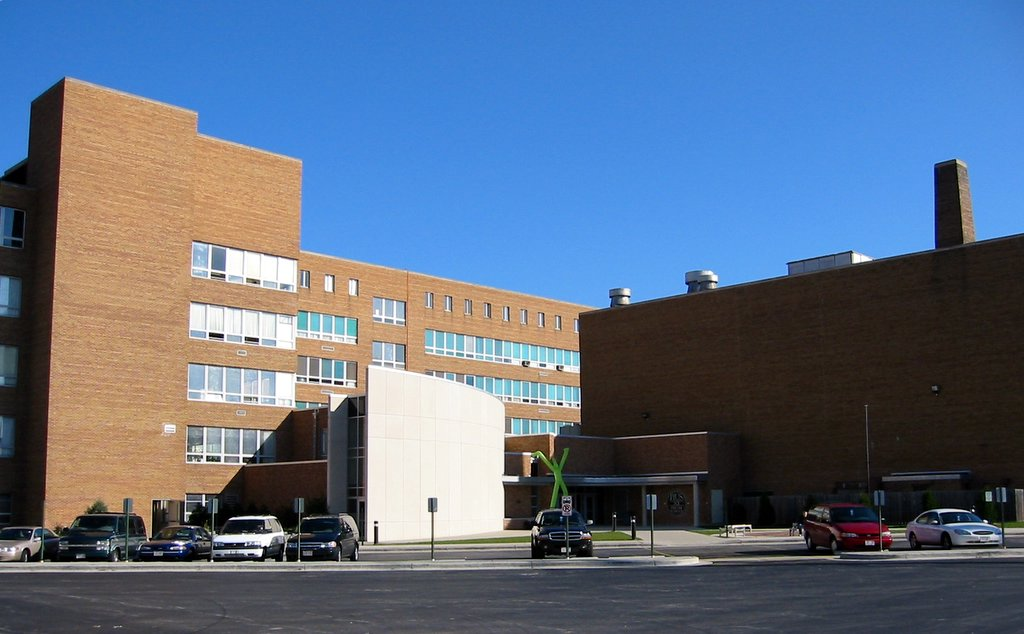

Location
- 135 North 76th Street; Milwaukee, Wisconsin; Milwaukee, (Milwaukee County), Wisconsin 53213; United States; 43°1′55″N 88°0′28″W

Information
- Type: Private, coeducational
- Motto: Find your inspiration. Change the future.
- Religious affiliation: Roman Catholic
- Established: 1929
- President: Jack Herbert
- Principal: Ryan Krienke
- Chaplain: Fr. Leon Martin, SAC
- Grades: 9–12
- Colors: Gold and white
- Fight song: "Give a Cheer"
- Athletics conference: Woodland Conference
- Mascot: Sugar Bear
- Team name: Popes and Lady Popes
- Accreditation: AdvancED
- Newspaper: Pius Post
- Alumni: 28,000
- Dean of Students: Jake Nowak
- Website: http://www.piusxi.org

Pius XI High School is a private Catholic high school in Milwaukee, Wisconsin. It is in the Roman Catholic Archdiocese of Milwaukee. Its enrollment is approximately 900.

== History ==
Pius XI High School, named in honor of Pope Pius XI, was founded in 1929. Originally it offered only the first three years of high school. Thus, the first graduation occurred in 1937, when the first senior class was added to the school. Enrollment grew from a class of eight in 1937 to over 2,000 students throughout the 1960s and 1970s. Current enrollment is approximately 730 students.

The original four-story school building was constructed in 1949, with a two-story addition, for six stories total, completed in 1957. Additional classroom space, library space, science laboratories and general renovations were completed in 1998, and a field house was annexed in 2004. The original gymnasium was remodeled into an auditorium, which was completed in the 2012–13 school year.

== Academics ==
Pius XI High School offers almost 200 courses, more than any other school in the state, including almost 20 advanced placement, honors, and accelerated courses. In recent years, Pius has twice been named a National Blue Ribbon School. It has more national board-certified teachers than any other private school in Wisconsin.

In 2007, several fine arts and English students were awarded 24 Gold and 16 Silver Key awards, some for portfolios from the National Scholastic Art & Writing Competition. In addition, several students have recently won awards and scholarships from the National Foundation for Advancement in the Arts, and the Wisconsin Regional ARTS Competition. Its students continue to receive awards for fine art. The Theater and English departments co-produced the Metro Milwaukee Young Playwrights Competition in 2005 and 2006 before the project was tabled.

The newest academic department is engineering, which offers a certified program called "Project Lead the Way" that prepares students for college engineering programs and allows them to earn college credit while in high school.

== Schedules ==
Instead of homerooms, Pius XI has TAC (Teacher Advisor Contact) rooms, a mixture of freshmen, sophomores, juniors and seniors. Each TAC is headed by a staff member called a "TAC teacher" who offers guidance to its TAC students. Pius XI has a modular scheduling system consisting of sixteen "mods" of 22 minutes each, with 4 minutes between mods. Most classes are 2 mods long, making them 48 minutes long (2 mods of 22 minutes, plus 4 minutes in between that are spent in class). Courses meet two, three, or four times per week and last from 22 to 90 minutes. This system provides flexibility in the frequency and duration of individual courses, and approximates the scheduling systems used by colleges and universities.

== Student government ==
The Pius XI High School Student Forum is responsible for bringing student concerns to the administrative level, bringing administrative opinions, decisions, views and ideas to the student body, to solve or assist in the solving of school-wide problems and act in the interest of the Pius XI community. The Forum is guided by a constitution that is renewed with each new set of representatives, board representatives, and officers. The president of the Forum is elected by the representatives at-large and the vice president is nominated by the president and moderator, subject to approval of the Student Forum.

== Athletics ==
Pius XI is a member of the Wisconsin Interscholastic Athletic Association and participates in the Woodland Conference. The boys' athletic teams play under the name "Popes", while the girls are the "Lady Popes". For one season Pius XI Popes Football team was renamed the "Storm", after which the name "Popes" was brought back permanently. Despite the papal nickname, no visual imagery that alludes to the Pope is used at sporting events. The team had an unofficial mascot of the "Sugar Bear", alluding to an advertisement from the 1960s. The Sugar Bear was absent from sporting events from 2004 to 2008 but returned to the sidelines in 2009. It has been Pius's unofficial mascot for over 50 years. In 2010 the Lady Popes won their first WIAA state basketball championship.

The Popes and the Lady Popes basketball teams were the last two to win the Wisconsin Independent Schools Athletic Association (WISAA) boys' and girls' state basketball championships. The boys' team finished with a school record of 24-1 and #1 in the Milwaukee Journal Sentinel's state and area polls. The girls had 18 conference championships in as many years and 12 state titles.

=== Conference affiliation history ===
- Milwaukee Catholic Conference (1942–1974)
- Metro Conference (1974–1997)
- Classic 8 Conference (1997–2012)
- Woodland Conference (2012–present)

== Notable alumni ==
- Matt Adamczyk, Wisconsin politician and businessman
- Paul Cebar, singer-songwriter
- James T. Flynn, 40th Lieutenant Governor of Wisconsin
- Mike Jurewicz, professional baseball player
- Mike Kelley, former collegiate basketball player for the Wisconsin Badgers and TV Analyst for ESPN and Fox Sports Network
- Jasmine Kondrakiewicz, basketball player
- Alan Kulwicki, 1992 NASCAR Winston Cup Champion
- Korie Lucious, former professional basketball player
- Michael Maize, motion picture and television actor
- Andrew Mozina, professor of English at Kalamazoo College
- Keith Nosbusch, CEO of Rockwell Automation
- Richard E. Pabst, Wisconsin state representative
- Cheryl Pawelski, record producer (Omnivore Recordings)
- Sergio Pettis, professional mixed martial artist
- Janet Protasiewicz, Wisconsin State Supreme Court Justice of the Wisconsin Supreme Court
- Michael J. Schumacher, writer, chronicler of the Beat Generation, biographer of Allen Ginsberg
- Adam Stockhausen, Oscar-winning production designer
