= St. Joseph Catholic Academy =

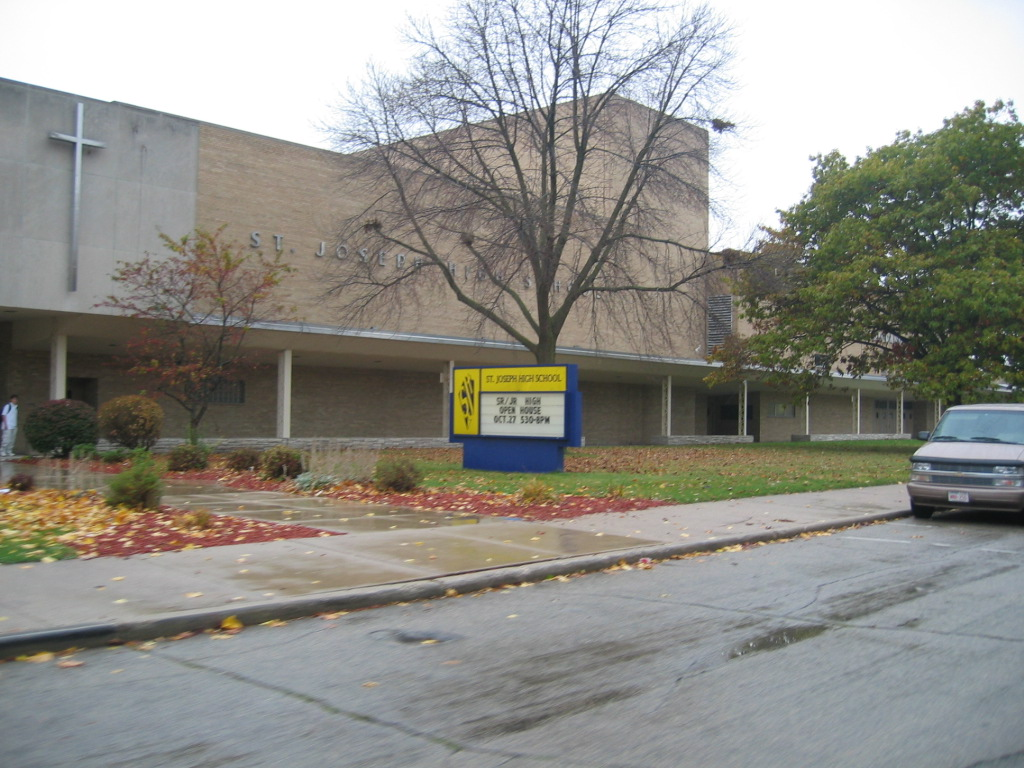

Location
- 2401 69th Street; Kenosha, (Kenosha County), Wisconsin 53143-5268; United States
- 42°34′14″N 87°50′17″W

Information
- Type: Private, coeducational
- Motto: "The wisdom of tradition, the vitality of today, with faith for tomorrow"
- Religious affiliation: Roman Catholic
- Established: July 1, 2010
- School code: 501-007
- President: Robert Fruend
- Faculty: 35
- Grades: Pre-K–12
- Campus: Urban
- Colors: Royal blue and gold
- Athletics conference: Metro Classic
- Team name: Lancers
- Accreditation: North Central Association of Colleges and Schools
- Athletic Director: Joe Gricar
- Website: www.sjcawi.org

St. Joseph Catholic Academy is a Catholic elementary and secondary parochial school in Kenosha, Wisconsin, created on July 1, 2010 as a result of the merging of St. Mark Elementary School, St. Joseph Interparish Junior High School, and St. Joseph High School. The school serves students from pre-kindergarten to 12th grade.

== History ==
St. Joseph High School was founded in 1958 by the School Sisters of the Third Order of St Francis and the Catholic parishes of Kenosha. In 2010, St. Joseph High School was combined with St. Mark the Evangelist Elementary School and St. Joseph Interparish Junior High School to form the St. Joseph Catholic Academy.

== Accreditation ==
Accreditation is through AdvancED, which consists of North Central Association Commission on Accreditation and School Improvement (NCA CASI), Northwest Accreditation Commission (NWAC) and Southern Association of Colleges and School Council on Accreditation and School Improvement (SACS CASI).

== Archdiocesan and parish affiliations ==
St. Joseph Catholic Academy is operated by the Archdiocese of Milwaukee and supported by all Kenosha area parishes. The school receives support from all 10 Catholic parishes in Kenosha and Pleasant Prairie: Our Lady of Mount Carmel, Our Lady of the Holy Rosary of Pompeii, St. Anne Catholic Church, St. Anthony of Padua, St. Elizabeth Catholic Church, St. James the Apostle, St. Mary Catholic Church, St. Mark the Evangelist, St. Peter Parish, and St. Therese of Lisieux.

== Notable alumni ==
- Kate Del Fava, soccer player
