= St. Joseph High School (Kenosha, Wisconsin) =

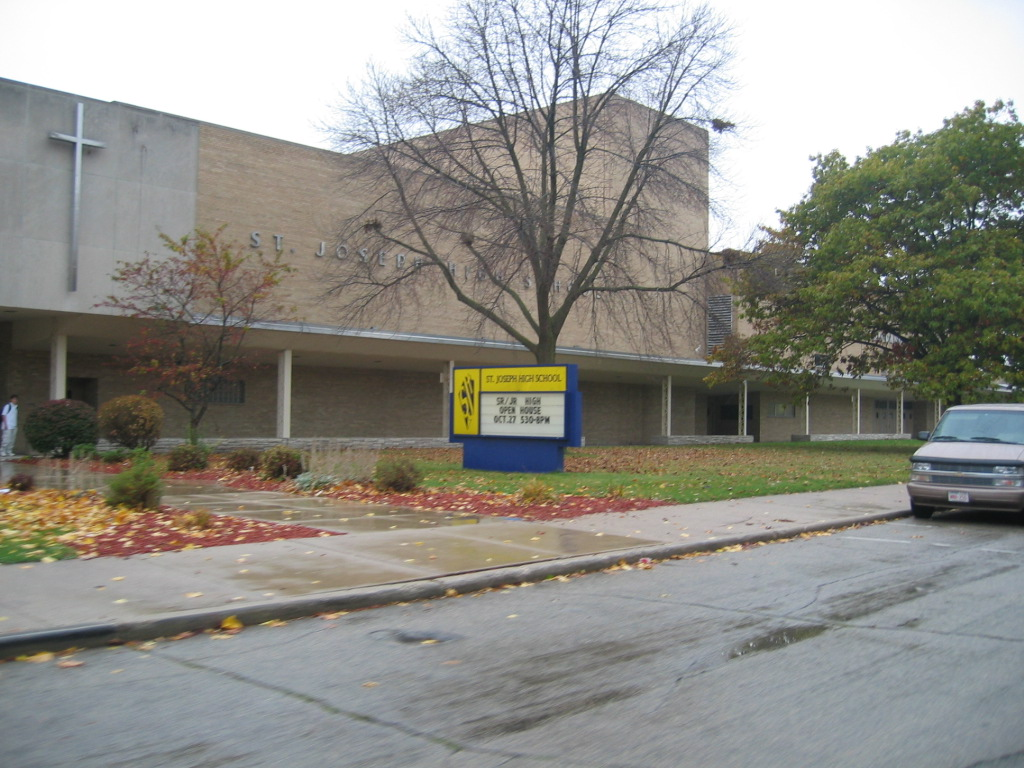

Location
- 2401 69th Street; Kenosha, (Kenosha County), Wisconsin 53143-5268; United States
- Coordinates: 42°34′14″N 87°50′17″W

Information
- Type: Private, coeducational
- Motto: "The wisdom of tradition, the vitality of today, with faith for tomorrow"
- Religious affiliation: Roman Catholic
- Established: 1958
- Closed: June 30, 2010
- School code: 501-007
- Faculty: 35
- Grades: 9–12
- Campus: Urban
- Colors: Royal blue and gold
- Athletics conference: Metro Classic
- Team name: Lancers
- Accreditation: North Central Association of Colleges and Schools
- Website: www.kenoshastjoseph.com

St. Joseph High School was a Catholic high school located in Kenosha, Wisconsin. It served students in grades 9 through 12. On July 1, 2010, it was merged along with St. Mark Elementary School and St. Joseph Interparish Jr. High into St. Joseph Catholic Academy.

== History ==
Founded in 1958 by the School Sisters of the Third Order of St Francis and the Catholic parishes of Kenosha, St. Joseph High School opened its doors in September 1958 to 460 freshmen and sophomores. In 1959 the school admitted students in grades 11 and 12. Mother Mary Corona, who was Major Superior of the School Sisters at the time, was instrumental in raising the funds necessary for the establishment of the school. Enrollment soared to 1,600 by 1965 but subsequently began to fall. The School Sisters of the Third Order of St Francis transferred ownership of the school to the Archdiocese of Milwaukee in 1991, celebrated officially with a Mass in September 1991 presided over by Archbishop Rembert Weakland. Catholic parishes in Kenosha and Pleasant Prairie continue to sponsor the school.

In 2010, St. Joseph High School was combined with St. Mark the Evangelist Elementary School and St. Joseph Interparish Junior High School to form the St. Joseph Catholic Academy.

== Notable alumni ==
- Jarvis Brown, Major League Baseball outfielder
- Laura Kaeppeler, Miss America 2012
- Tom Regner, football player for the Houston Oilers
- Jim Rygiel, three-time Oscar winner for visual effects, Lord of the Rings series
- Michael J. Schumacher, writer, chronicler of the Beat Generation, biographer of Allen Ginsberg
- Nick Van Exel, former NBA star
