= Saint Thomas More High School (Milwaukee) =

Private coeducational school in Milwaukee, Wisconsin, United States

- formerly Thomas More High School

Location
- 2601 East Morgan Avenue; Milwaukee, (Milwaukee County), Wisconsin 53207-3725; United States; 42°58′47″N 87°52′35″W

Information
- Type: Private, Coeducational
- Motto: Inspired by Christ, driven by Innovation.
- Religious affiliation: Catholic
- Patron saint: Thomas More
- Established: 1890 (as Pio Nono)
- School district: Archdiocese of Milwaukee
- President: John Hoch
- Principal: Mark Nagle
- Chaplain: Fr. Alex Nwosu
- Faculty: 29
- Grades: 9–12
- Average class size: 22
- Colors: Cavalier Blue and Grey
- Athletics: 18 varsity sports
- Athletics conference: Metro Classic
- Nickname: TM, STM, More
- Team name: Cavaliers
- Accreditation: North Central Association of Colleges and Schools
- Newspaper: The Utopian
- Yearbook: The Chancellor
- Athletic Director: Katlyn Putney
- Website: http://www.tmore.org

Saint Thomas More High School is a private, Catholic high school in Milwaukee, Wisconsin. It is in the Archdiocese of Milwaukee.

== Background ==
Saint Thomas More High School was established in 1972 by the merger of Don Bosco and Pio Nono High Schools. It was initially named Thomas More High School, but the "Saint" was added to the name in the summer of 2007 to re-emphasize the school's Catholic heritage, at the request of Archbishop Timothy Dolan.

Beginning in 2007, students are equipped with a laptop computer at the start of the school year.

== Athletics ==
Saint Thomas More High School is a member of the Wisconsin Interscholastic Athletic Association and the Metro Classic Conference. The school offers the following sports:

Fall: football, boys' cross country, girls' cross country, boys' soccer, girls' volleyball, girls' swimming, girls' tennis, girls' golf, girls' pom pons

Winter: boys' basketball, girls' basketball, boys' bowling, girls' bowling, boys' swimming, girls' pom pons, wrestling

Spring: baseball, boys' track & field, girls' track & field, boys' tennis, boys' golf, girls' soccer, girls' softball

=== State titles ===
Thomas More High School has won 19 state titles from 1973 to the present:

- 1973 boys' cross country
- 1974 boys' cross country
- 1974 boys' wrestling
- 1975 boys' wrestling
- 1976 football
- 1976 boys' cross country
- 1977 football
- 1978 boys' cross country
- 1980 boys' cross country
- 1981 boys' cross country
- 1981 football
- 1981 boys' track & field
- 1981 boys' baseball
- 1988 boys' basketball
- 1996 boys' baseball
- 1999 girls' volleyball
- 2000 girls' volleyball
- 2006 Soccer
- 2024 boys' basketball

=== Conference championships ===
PN denotes Pio Nono, DB denotes Don Bosco

- Boys' soccer (TM: 1998, 1999, 2012)
- Wrestling (DB: 1958, 1965, 1969, 1970; PN: 1972; TM: 1974, 1975, 1977, 1978, 1979, 1980, 1981)
- Boys' track & field (TM: 1976, 1981)
- Boys' golf (PN: 1931; DB: 1962; TM: 1986, 1998, 2001, 2002, 2010, 2011, 2012)
- Football (PN: 1927, 1935, 1936; DB: 1953, 1954, 1961, 1964, 1965, 1966, 1967, 1970; TM: 1973, 1974, 1976, 1979, 1980, 1981, 2004)
- Boys' cross country (TM: 1973, 1974, 1975, 1976, 1977, 1978, 1979, 1980, 1981, 1982, 1998)
- Boys' basketball (PN: 1932, 1937; DB: 1952, 1953, 1955, 1956, 1968, 1970; TM: 1977, 1982, 1987, 1988, 1998, 2001, 2002)
- Baseball (PN: 1931; DB: 1954, 1955; TM: 1975, 1980, 1981, 1984, 1987, 1996, 1997, 1999, 2001, 2005, 2009)
- Boys' tennis (TM: 2011, 2012)
- Girls' volleyball (TM: 1995, 1997, 1998, 1999, 2000, 2001, 2002, 2003, 2004, 2007)
- Softball (TM: 1995, 1996)
- Girls' basketball (TM: 1998, 2000)
- Girls' golf (TM: 2003)
- Girls' bowling (TM: 2009)

Thomas More's girls' volleyball team had a winning streak from 1997 to 2005, during which it won 77 conference matches and 8 consecutive conference titles.

The school's mascot is the Cavaliers.

=== Athletic conference affiliation history ===
==== Don Bosco ====
- Milwaukee Catholic Conference (1947-1972)

==== Pio Nono ====
- Milwaukee Catholic Conference (1930-1941, 1968-1972)

==== Thomas More ====
- Milwaukee Catholic Conference (1972-1974)
- Metro Conference (1974-1997)
- Woodland Conference (1997-2012)
- Metro Classic Conference (2012–present)

== Notable alumni and faculty ==
- George Lee Andrews, Broadway actor and Guinness World Records holder for most performances in the same Broadway show, The Phantom of the Opera
- Dave Cieslewicz, 56th mayor of Madison, Wisconsin
- Pedro Colón, first Latino elected to the Wisconsin legislature, now a Wisconsin circuit judge
- Anthony Crivello, Tony Award-winning actor in 1993 for Kiss of the Spider Woman
- Jonathan Dekker, professional football player
- Bob Donovan, Wisconsin state legislator
- Jim Haluska, Rose Bowl quarterback and NFL player, coached and taught at Thomas More
- Chris Larson, member of the Wisconsin State Senate
- Dick Miller, Played for Indiana Pacers and Utah Jazz during 1980–81 season
- Jerry Panek, professional soccer player and coach, former coach at St. Thomas More
- John R. Plewa, Wisconsin state senator
- Edward J. Zore, Former CEO of Northwestern Mutual
- T. J. Otzelberger, American basketball coach, currently Head Men’s Basketball Coach at Iowa State University (ISU)
- Jim Jodat, former NFL football player with the Rams, Seahawks, and Chargers
