= Wisconsin Independent Schools Athletic Association =

Former high school sports governing body

- Formerly: Wisconsin Catholic Interscholastic Athletic Association (1957–1968)
- Founded: 1968
- Folded: 2000
- No. of teams: 54 (1968), 59 (2000)
- Headquarters: La Crosse, Wisconsin

Locations

WISAA Member School Locations (1968)

The Wisconsin Independent Schools Athletic Association is a former organization for high school athletics in Wisconsin. Consisting entirely of private schools, it was formed in 1968 and completed a merger with the Wisconsin Interscholastic Athletic Association in 2000.

== History ==
The Wisconsin Independent Schools Athletic Association traces its origin back to a predecessor organization formed in 1957, the Wisconsin Catholic Interscholastic Athletic Association. Around the same time as the WCIAA was formed, many new non-Catholic private high schools opened in the state of Wisconsin, and in 1968, the forty-one member schools of the WCIAA added thirteen new members outside of the organization to form the initial WISAA roster:

- Fox Valley Lutheran High School (Appleton)
- Luther High School (Onalaska)
- Milwaukee Lutheran High School
- Northwestern Military & Naval Academy (Lake Geneva)
- Queen of Apostles High School (Madison)
- Racine Lutheran High School
- St. John's Military Academy (Delafield)
- The Prairie School (Wind Point)
- University Lake School (Hartland)
- University School of Milwaukee (River Hills)
- Wayland Academy (Beaver Dam)
- Wisconsin Lutheran High School (Milwaukee)

In the early 1970s, WISAA became a leader in promoting interscholastic girls' athletics, sponsoring the first statewide girls' track meet in 1971, just over a year before Title IX was written into law. The next year, WISAA admitted five all-girls high schools into the organization: four in Milwaukee (Divine Savior Holy Angels, Mercy, St. Joan Antida and St. Mary's Academy) and St. Joseph Academy in Green Bay.

Membership levels fluctuated over the course of WISAA's history, but the organization generally had between 50 and 65 member schools at any given time. By the 1990s, there were increasing calls to merge WISAA into the WIAA to create a single statewide governing body for interscholastic athletics. This became a reality in 1997 when a merger agreement was reached between the two organizations, and it was finalized for the 2000–01 school year. The last remaining vestige of the organization is the Midwest Classic Conference, which is the only WISAA-affiliated conference to move over to the WIAA after the merger.

== Executive Directors ==
- Steve Pavela (1968–1988)
- Al Bill (1988–1997)
- Burt McDonald (1997–2000)

== WISAA membership history ==
School	Location	Affiliation	Enrollment	Mascot	Colors	Joined	Left	Current Status
Abbot Pennings	De Pere	Catholic (Norbertine)	N/A (Boys only)	Squires		1968	1990	Merged into Notre Dame Academy
Aquinas	La Crosse	Catholic	307	Blugolds		1968	2000	WIAA (Mississippi Valley)
Assumption	Wisconsin Rapids	Catholic	139	Royals		1968	2000	WIAA (Marawood)
Beloit Catholic	Beloit	Catholic	N/A	Crusaders		1968	2000	Closed
Burlington Catholic Central	Burlington	Catholic	128	Hilltoppers		1968	2000	WIAA (Midwest Classic)
Campion Jesuit	Prairie du Chien	Catholic (Jesuit)	N/A	Red Knights		1968	1975	Closed
Cathedral	Superior	Catholic	N/A	Panthers		1968	1969	Closed
Catholic Memorial	Waukesha	Catholic	576	Crusaders		1968	2000	WIAA (Classic Eight)
Columbus Catholic	Marshfield	Catholic	146	Dons		1968	2000	WIAA (Cloverbelt)
Concordia Prep	Milwaukee	Lutheran (LCMS)	N/A	Falcons		1968	1971	Closed
de Sales Prep	St. Francis	Catholic	N/A	Saints		1968	1979	Closed
Dominican	Whitefish Bay	Catholic (Sinsinawa Dominican)	324	Knights		1968	2000	WIAA (Metro Classic)
Don Bosco	Milwaukee	Catholic	N/A	Dons		1968	1972	Merged into Thomas More
Edgewood	Madison	Catholic	569	Crusaders		1968	2000	WIAA (Badger)
Fox Valley Lutheran	Appleton	Lutheran (WELS)	742	Foxes		1968	2000	WIAA (North Eastern)
Francis Jordan	Milwaukee	Catholic	N/A	Cardinals		1968	1969	Closed
Holy Cross Seminary	La Crosse	Catholic	N/A	Comets		1968	1971	Closed
Holy Name Seminary	Madison	Catholic	N/A (Boys only)	Hilanders		1968	1995	Closed
John F. Kennedy Prep	St. Nazianz	Catholic	N/A	Moors		1968	1982	Closed
Lourdes Academy	Oshkosh	Catholic	178	Knights		1968	2000	WIAA (Trailways)
Luther	Onalaska	Lutheran (WELS)	228	Knights		1968	2000	WIAA (Coulee)
Marinette Central Catholic	Marinette	Catholic	38	Cavaliers		1968	2000	WIAA (Marinette & Oconto)
Marquette University	Milwaukee	Catholic (Jesuit)	1,794 (Boys only)	Hilltoppers		1968	2000	WIAA (Greater Metro)
McDonell Central Catholic	Chippewa Falls	Catholic	206	Macks		1968	2000	WIAA (Cloverbelt)
Messmer	Milwaukee	Catholic	499	Bishops		1968	2000	WIAA (Midwest Classic)
Milwaukee Lutheran	Milwaukee	Lutheran (LCMS)	908	Red Knights		1968	2000	WIAA (Woodland)
Newman Catholic	Wausau	Catholic	128	Cardinals		1968	2000	WIAA (Marawood)
Northwestern Military & Naval Academy	Lake Geneva	Nonsectarian, Military	N/A (Boys only)	Falcons		1968	1995	Closed
Notre Dame	Milwaukee	Catholic	N/A	Redwings		1968	1988	Closed
Our Lady of Premontre	Green Bay	Catholic	N/A (Boys only)	Cadets		1968	1990	Merged into Notre Dame Academy
Pacelli	Stevens Point	Catholic	169	Cardinals		1968	2000	WIAA (Central Wisconsin)
Pio Nono	St. Francis	Catholic	N/A	Spartans		1968	1972	Merged into Thomas More
Pius XI	Milwaukee	Catholic	699	Popes		1968	2000	WIAA (Woodland)
Queen of Apostles	Madison	Catholic	N/A	Raiders		1968	1979	Closed
Racine Lutheran	Racine	Lutheran (LCMS)	303	Crusaders		1968	2000	WIAA (Metro Classic)
Regis	Eau Claire	Catholic	210	Ramblers		1968	2000	WIAA (Cloverbelt)
Roncalli	Manitowoc	Catholic	223	Jets		1968	2000	WIAA (Eastern Wisconsin)
Sacred Heart Seminary	Oneida	Catholic	N/A	Scouts		1968	1976	Closed
St. Bonaventure	Sturtevant	Catholic	N/A	Cardinals		1968	1983	Closed
St. Catherine's	Racine	Catholic (Dominican)	472	Angels		1968	2000	WIAA (Metro Classic)
St. Gregory	St. Nazianz	Catholic	N/A	Knights		1968	1969	Closed
St. John	Little Chute	Catholic	N/A	Flying Dutchmen		1968	1973	Closed
St. John's Cathedral	Milwaukee	Catholic	N/A	Eagles		1968	1976	Closed
St. John's Northwestern Military Academy	Delafield	Nonsectarian, Military	236	Lancers		1968	2000	WIAA (Midwest Classic)
St. Joseph	Kenosha	Catholic	229	Lancers		1968	2000	WIAA (Metro Classic)
St. Lawrence Seminary	Mount Calvary	Catholic (Capuchin)	256 (Boys only)	Hilltoppers		1968	2000	WIAA (Independent)
St. Mary Catholic	Neenah	Catholic	277	Zephyrs		1968	2000	WIAA (Big East)
St. Mary's Springs	Fond du Lac	Catholic	263	Ledgers		1968	2000	WIAA (Wisconsin Flyway)
The Prairie School	Wind Point	Nonsectarian	226	Hawks		1968	2000	WIAA (Metro Classic)
University Lake School	Hartland	Nonsectarian	73	Lakers		1968	2000	WIAA (Lake City)
University School of Milwaukee	River Hills	Nonsectarian	406	Wildcats		1968	2000	WIAA (Midwest Classic)
Wayland Academy	Beaver Dam	Nonsectarian (historically Baptist)	159	Big Red		1968	2000	WIAA (Trailways)
Wisconsin Lutheran	Milwaukee	Lutheran (WELS)	938	Vikings		1968	2000	WIAA (Woodland)
Xavier	Appleton	Catholic	468	Hawks		1968	2000	WIAA (Bay)
Brookfield Academy	Brookfield	Nonsectarian	334	Blue Knights		1969	2000	WIAA (Midwest Classic)
Martin Luther	Greendale	Lutheran (LCMS)	649	Spartans		1969	2000	WIAA (Metro Classic)
Divine Word Seminary	East Troy	Catholic	N/A (Boys only)	Titans		1970	1991	Closed
St. Joseph Seminary	Edgerton	Catholic	N/A (Boys only)	Johawks		1970	1980	Closed
Sheboygan Christian	Sheboygan	Non-denominational Christian	131	Eagles		1971	2000	WIAA (Big East)
Central Wisconsin Christian	Waupun	Reformed	119	Crusaders		1972	2000	WIAA (Trailways)
Divine Savior Holy Angels	Milwaukee	Catholic	1,344 (Girls only)	Dashers		1972	2000	WIAA (Greater Metro)
Mercy	Milwaukee	Catholic	N/A (Girls only)	None		1972	1973	Closed
St. Joan Antida	Milwaukee	Catholic	376 (Girls only)	Jaguars		1972	2000	WIAA (Lake City)
St. Joseph Academy	Green Bay	Catholic	N/A (Girls only)	Sajoacs		1972	1990	Merged into Notre Dame Academy
St. Mary's Academy	Milwaukee	Catholic	N/A (Girls only)	None		1972	1991	Closed
Thomas More	Milwaukee	Catholic (Marianist)	547	Cavaliers		1972	2000	WIAA (Metro Classic)
Maranatha Baptist Academy	Watertown	Baptist	65	Crusaders		1974	1982	WIAA (Indian Trails)
Northwestern Prep	Watertown	Lutheran (WELS)	N/A	Hornets		1974	1995	Merged into Luther Prep
Shoreland Lutheran	Somers	Lutheran (WELS)	384	Pacers		1974	2000	WIAA (Metro Classic)
Lakeside Lutheran	Lake Mills	Lutheran (WELS)	506	Warriors		1975	2000	WIAA (Capitol)
Kettle Moraine Lutheran	Jackson	Lutheran (WELS)	553	Chargers		1976	2000	WIAA (East Central)
Winnebago Lutheran Academy	Fond du Lac	Lutheran (WELS)	319	Vikings		1976	2000	WIAA (Wisconsin Flyway)
Manitowoc Lutheran	Manitowoc	Lutheran (WELS)	227	Lancers		1977	2000	WIAA (Big East)
Union Grove Christian	Union Grove	Non-denominational Christian	N/A	Cougars		1978	1982	Joined WIAA (Closed in 2018)
Immanuel Lutheran	Eau Claire	Lutheran (CELC)	96	Lancers		1979	2000	WIAA (Dairyland)
Martin Luther Prep	Prairie du Chien	Lutheran (WELS)	N/A	Rams		1979	1995	Merged into Luther Prep
Northeastern Wisconsin Lutheran	Green Bay	Lutheran (LCMS)	145	Blazers		1979	2000	WIAA (Packerland)
Sheboygan Lutheran	Sheboygan	Lutheran (LCMS)	206	Crusaders		1980	2000	WIAA (Big East)
Heritage Christian	New Berlin	Protestant	196	Patriots		1987	2000	WIAA (Midwest Classic)
Notre Dame Academy	Green Bay	Catholic	727	Tritons		1990	2000	WIAA (Fox River Classic)
Abundant Life Christian	Madison	Non-denominational Christian	115	Challengers		1994	2000	WIAA (Trailways)
Luther Prep	Watertown	Lutheran (WELS)	407	Phoenix		1995	2000	WIAA (Midwest Classic)
Christian Life	Kenosha	Non-denominational Christian	202	Eagles		1996	2000	WIAA (Midwest Classic)
Faith Christian School	Williams Bay	Non-denominational Christian	62	Eagles		1998	2000	WIAA (Lake City)
Oshkosh Christian	Oshkosh	Non-denominational Christian	N/A	Eagles		1998	2000	Merged into Valley Christian

== Former WISAA-affiliated conferences ==
- Central Wisconsin Catholic Conference (1968-2000)
- Classic Conference (1973-1983)
- Fox Valley Catholic Conference (1968-1971)
- Fox Valley Christian Conference (1971-1999)
- Metro Conference (1974-1997)
- Midwest Classic Conference (1983-2000)
- Midwest Prep Conference (1968-1983)
- Milwaukee Catholic Conference (1968-1974)

== WISAA members in non-WISAA conferences ==
School	Location	Tenure	Conference
Beloit Catholic High School	Beloit	1968–1981	SHARK Conference
Cathedral High School	Superior	1968–1969	Michigan-Wisconsin Conference
Holy Name Seminary	Madision	1968–1969	Wisconsin Seminary League
Northwestern Military & Naval Academy	Lake Geneva	1968–1995	Indian Trails Conference
Sacred Heart Seminary	Oneida	1968–1969	Wisconsin Seminary League
St. Lawrence Seminary	Mount Calvary	1968–1969	Wisconsin Seminary League
St. Mary's High School	Burlington	1968–1970	Southeastern Badger Conference
Brookfield Academy	Brookfield	1969–1976	Indian Trails Conference
Queen of Apostles High School	Madison	1969–1979	Eastern Suburban Conference
The Prairie School	Wind Point	1969–1977	Indian Trails Conference
Divine Word Seminary	East Troy	1970–1991	Indian Trails Conference
John F. Kennedy Preparatory School	St. Nazianz	1970–1973	Central Lakeshore Conference
St. Lawrence Seminary	Mount Calvary	1970–1979	Bay-Lakes Conference
Holy Name Seminary	Madison	1971–1995	State Line League
St. Joseph Seminary	Edgerton	1971–1980	Indian Trails Conference
Wisconsin Lutheran High School	Milwaukee	1974–2000	Wisconsin Little Ten Conference
Lakeside Lutheran High School	Lake Mills	1975–1995	Eastern Suburban Conference
Maranatha Baptist Academy	Watertown	1976–2000	Indian Trails Conference
Winnebago Lutheran Academy	Fond du Lac	1976–1979	Bay-Lakes Conference
Manitowoc Lutheran High School	Manitowoc	1977–1979	Bay-Lakes Conference
Martin Luther Preparatory Academy	Prairie du Chien	1979–1995	Black Hawk League
Beloit Catholic High School	Beloit	1982–1996	Rock Valley Conference
University Lake School	Hartland	1982–2000	SWISS Conference
Brookfield Academy	Brookfield	1984–1996	SWISS Conference
Messmer High School	Milwaukee	1986–1993	Indian Trails Conference
Heritage Christian School	New Berlin	1987–1989	SWISS Conference
Luther High School	Onalaska	1991–1997	Dairyland Conference
Notre Dame Academy	Green Bay	1993–2000	Fox River Valley Conference
Abundant Life Christian School	Madison	1994–1998	SWISS Conference
Wayland Academy	Beaver Dam	1994–1996	Indian Trails Conference
Lakeside Lutheran High School	Lake Mills	1995–2000	Capitol Conference
Beloit Catholic High School	Beloit	1996–2000	Indian Trails Conference
Christian Life School	Kenosha	1996–2000	SWISS Conference
Aquinas High School	La Crosse	1997–2000	Mississippi Valley Conference
Catholic Memorial High School	Waukesha	1997–2000	Classic Eight Conference
Divine Savior Holy Angels High School	Milwaukee	1997–2000	Greater Metro Conference
Faith Christian Academy	Williams Bay	1997–2000	SWISS Conference
Luther High School	Onalaska	1997–2000	Coulee Conference
Marquette University High School	Milwaukee	1997–2000	Greater Metro Conference
Martin Luther High School	Greendale	1997–2000	Parkland Conference
Milwaukee Lutheran High School	Milwaukee	1997–2000	North Shore Conference
Pius XI High School	Milwaukee	1997–2000	Classic Eight Conference
St. Catherine's High School	Racine	1997–2000	Lakeshore Conference
St. Joseph Catholic Academy	Kenosha	1997–2000	Lakeshore Conference
Union Grove Christian School	Union Grove	1997–2000	Indian Trails Conference
Kettle Moraine Lutheran High School	Jackson	1998–2000	Parkland Conference
Luther Preparatory School	Watertown	1998–2000	Parkland Conference
Oshkosh Community Christian School	Oshkosh	1998–1999	Indian Trails Conference
Central Wisconsin Christian High School	Waupun	1999–2000	Flyway Conference
Fox Valley Lutheran High School	Appleton	1999–2000	Valley Eight Conference
Lourdes Academy	Oshkosh	1999–2000	East Central Conference
Manitowoc Lutheran High School	Manitowoc	1999–2000	Olympian Conference
Marinette Central Catholic High School	Marinette	1999–2000	Marinette & Oconto Conference
Northeastern Wisconsin Lutheran High School	Green Bay	1999–2000	Packerland Conference
Roncalli High School	Manitowoc	1999–2000	Eastern Wisconsin Conference
Sheboygan Christian School	Sheboygan	1999–2000	Central Lakeshore Conference
Sheboygan Lutheran High School	Sheboygan	1999–2000	Central Lakeshore Conference
St. Lawrence Seminary	Mount Calvary	1999–2000	Flyway Conference
St. Mary Catholic High School	Neenah	1999–2000	Olympian Conference
St. Mary's Springs Academy	Fond du Lac	1999–2000	Flyway Conference
Winnebago Lutheran Academy	Fond du Lac	1999–2000	Flyway Conference
Xavier High School	Appleton	1999–2000	Valley Eight Conference

== List of sponsored sports ==
=== Fall sports ===
- Boys Cross Country (1968–2000)
- Girls Cross Country (1980–2000)
- Football (1969–2000)
- Golf (1974–1996)
- Boys Soccer (1974–2000)
- Girls Tennis (1973–2000)
- Volleyball (1972–2000)

=== Winter sports ===
- Boys Basketball (1969–2000)
- Girls Basketball (1975–2000)
- Boys Hockey (1985-1995)
- Wrestling (1969–2000)

=== Spring sports ===
- Baseball (1969–2000)
- Golf (1969–1974, 1998–2000)
- Girls Soccer (1987–2000)
- Softball (1977–2000)
- Boys Tennis (1969–2000)
- Boys Track & Field (1969–2000)
- Girls Track & Field (1971–2000)

== List of state champions ==
=== Fall sports ===
Boys Cross Country
Year	Class A	Class B	
1968	St. Catherine's	Holy Name Seminary	
1969	St. Catherine's	Roncalli	
1970	St. Catherine's	Roncalli	
1971	St. Catherine's	St. Mary's Springs	
1972	Pius XI	Holy Name Seminary	
1973	Thomas More	Roncalli	
Year	Class A	Class B	Class C
1974	Thomas More	Assumption	Columbus Catholic
1975	St. Catherine's	St. Lawrence Seminary	University School
1976	Thomas More	Roncalli	University School
1977	Aquinas	St. Lawrence Seminary	University School
1978	Thomas More	Newman Catholic	Central Wisconsin Christian
1979	Aquinas	Newman Catholic	Holy Name Seminary
1980	Thomas More	Newman Catholic	Holy Name Seminary
1981	Thomas More	Newman Catholic	Regis
1982	Our Lady of Premontre	Pacelli	University School
1983	Our Lady of Premontre	Newman Catholic	University School
1984	Marquette University	Newman Catholic	McDonell Central Catholic
1985	St. Catherine's	Pacelli	Newman Catholic
Year	Class A	Class B	
1986	Marquette University	Pacelli	
1987	Marquette University	Pacelli	
1988	Marquette University	Pacelli	
1989	Marquette University	Newman Catholic	
1990	Marquette University	Pacelli	
1991	Marquette University	Pacelli	
Year	Division 1	Division 2	
1992	Marquette University	Lakeside Lutheran	
1993	Pius XI	St. Lawrence Seminary	
1994	Marquette University	Pacelli	
1995	Marquette University	Pacelli	
1996	St. Catherine's	Pacelli	
1997	Marquette University	McDonell Central Catholic	
1998	Marquette University	McDonell Central Catholic	
1999	Catholic Memorial	Lakeside Lutheran	

Girls Cross Country
Year	Champion	
1980	Catholic Memorial	
Year	Class A	Class B
1981	Catholic Memorial	Pacelli
1982	Catholic Memorial	Pacelli
1983	Catholic Memorial	Columbus Catholic
1984	Dominican	Pacelli
1985	Catholic Memorial	Pacelli
1986	Aquinas	Pacelli
1987	Aquinas	Pacelli
1988	Catholic Memorial	Pacelli
1989	Catholic Memorial	Pacelli
1990	Notre Dame Academy	Pacelli
1991	Catholic Memorial	Pacelli
Year	Division 1	Division 2
1992	Catholic Memorial	St. Mary's Springs
1993	Catholic Memorial	St. Mary's Springs
1994	Catholic Memorial	McDonell Central Catholic
1995	Catholic Memorial	St. Mary's Springs
1996	Aquinas	St. Mary's Springs
1997	Catholic Memorial	St. Mary's Springs
1998	Catholic Memorial	St. Mary's Springs
1999	Catholic Memorial	McDonell Central Catholic

Football
Year	Champion		
1969	Roncalli		
1970	Our Lady of Premontre		
1971	Abbot Pennings		
1972	Pius XI		
1973	Assumption		
1974	Lourdes Academy		
1975	Marquette University		
Year	Class A	Class B	
1976	Thomas More	St. Mary's (Burlington)	
1977	Thomas More	St. Mary's (Burlington)	
1978	Our Lady of Premontre	St. Mary's (Burlington)	
1979	Catholic Memorial	Martin Luther Prep	
1980	Columbus Catholic	Northwestern Prep	
1981	Thomas More	St. Mary's (Burlington)	
1982	Marquette University	Martin Luther Prep	
1983	St. Mary's Springs	St. Mary's (Burlington)	
1984	St. Mary's Springs	Northwestern Prep	
1985	Marquette University	Holy Name Seminary	
1986	Pacelli	Winnebago Lutheran	
1987	Marquette University	Martin Luther Prep	
1988	Marquette University	St. John's Military Academy	
Year	Division 1	Division 2	Division 3
1989	Catholic Memorial	Northwestern Prep	McDonell Central Catholic
1990	St. Mary's Springs	Dominican	Northwestern Prep
1991	St. Mary's Springs	Northwestern Prep	Burlington Catholic Central
1992	Notre Dame Academy	Columbus Catholic	Regis
1993	Catholic Memorial	Aquinas	Regis
1994	Marquette University	St. Joseph	Columbus Catholic
1995	St. Mary's Springs	Aquinas	Pacelli
1996	Catholic Memorial	Roncalli	Columbus Catholic
1997	Marquette University	Roncalli	St. Mary's Springs
1998	Wisconsin Lutheran	St. Mary's Springs	Roncalli
1999	Marquette University	St. Mary's Springs	Regis

Golf
Year	Champion
1974	St. Catherine's
1975	Aquinas
1976	Pius XI
1977	Aquinas
1978	Our Lady of Premontre
1979	Our Lady of Premontre
1980	Edgewood
1981	Our Lady of Premontre
1982	Marquette University
1983	Marquette University
1984	Edgewood
1985	Our Lady of Premontre
1986	Abbot Pennings
1987	Abbot Pennings
1988	Abbot Pennings
1989	Wisconsin Lutheran
1990	Edgewood
1991	Notre Dame Academy
1992	Marquette University
1993	Catholic Memorial
1994	Catholic Memorial
1995	Aquinas
1996	Edgewood

Boys Soccer
Year	Champion	
1974	Marquette University	
1975	University School	
1976	The Prairie School	
1977	Notre Dame	
1978	University Lake School	
1979	Marquette University	
1980	Pius XI	
1981	Marquette University	
1982	Marquette University	
1983	Catholic Memorial	
1984	Marquette University	
1985	Marquette University	
1986	Marquette University	
1987	Abbot Pennings	
1988	Pius XI	
1989	Marquette University	
1990	Marquette University	
1991	Catholic Memorial	
Year	Division 1	Division 2
1992	Marquette University	Sheboygan Christian
1993	Pius XI	University School
1994	Marquette University	Central Wisconsin Christian
1995	Marquette University	University School
1996	Marquette University	University School
1997	Marquette University	Kettle Moraine Lutheran
1998	Marquette University	Sheboygan Christian
1999	Marquette University	Heritage Christian

Girls Tennis
Year	Champion
1973	The Prairie School
1974	The Prairie School
1975	The Prairie School
1976	University School
1977	University School
1978	Dominican, University School (tie)
1979	Dominican
1980	The Prairie School
1981	St. Joseph Academy
1982	University School
1983	University School
1984	University School
1985	The Prairie School
1986	The Prairie School
1987	Brookfield Academy
1988	University School
1989	University School
1990	University School
1991	University School
1992	Divine Savior Holy Angels
1993	Divine Savior Holy Angels
1994	Divine Savior Holy Angels
1995	University School
1996	Divine Savior Holy Angels
1997	University School
1998	Divine Savior Holy Angels
1999	Divine Savior Holy Angels

Volleyball
Year	Champion	
1972	Divine Savior Holy Angels	
1973	Dominican	
1974	Dominican	
1975	Milwaukee Lutheran	
1976	Dominican	
1977	Milwaukee Lutheran	
1978	St. Catherine's	
1979	Dominican	
1980	Edgewood	
Year	Class A	Class B
1981	Pius XI	St. Mary Catholic
1982	Pius XI	St. Mary Catholic
1983	Pius XI	Northwestern Prep
1984	Aquinas	St. Mary's (Burlington)
1985	Divine Savior Holy Angels	Marinette Central Catholic
1986	Pius XI	Marinette Central Catholic
1987	Pius XI	Marinette Central Catholic
1988	Pius XI	Kettle Moraine Lutheran
1989	Pius XI	Manitowoc Lutheran
1990	Pius XI	Marinette Central Catholic
1991	Pius XI	Columbus Catholic
Year	Division 1	Division 2
1992	Pius XI	Regis
1993	Pius XI	Heritage Christian
1994	Pius XI	Pacelli
1995	Wisconsin Lutheran	Regis
1996	Wisconsin Lutheran	Lourdes Academy
1997	Catholic Memorial	Regis
1998	Catholic Memorial	Regis
1999	Thomas More	McDonell Central Catholic

=== Winter sports ===
Boys Basketball
Year	Champion		
1969	St. Catherine's		
1970	Pius XI		
1971	St. Catherine's		
1972	Marquette University		
1973	Marquette University		
1974	Dominican		
Year	Class A	Class B	
1975	Pius XI	Racine Lutheran	
1976	Pius XI	Notre Dame	
1977	St. Catherine's	Beloit Catholic	
1978	Dominican	Notre Dame	
1979	Dominican	Notre Dame	
1980	Marquette University	Central Wisconsin Christian	
1981	Marquette University	Sheboygan Christian	
1982	Our Lady of Premontre	The Prairie School	
1983	Marquette University	Marinette Central Catholic	
1984	Marquette University	St. Mary's (Burlington)	
1985	St. Catherine's	Northwestern Prep	
1986	Marquette University	Northwestern Prep	
1987	Catholic Memorial	Messmer	
1988	Thomas More	Messmer	
1989	Marquette University	Messmer	
1990	Abbot Pennings	Northwestern Prep	
1991	Dominican	Racine Lutheran	
Year	Division 1	Division 2	Division 3
1992	St. Catherine's	Northwestern Prep	Sheboygan Christian
1993	St. Catherine's	St. Mary's Springs	Central Wisconsin Christian
1994	Marquette University	St. Mary's Springs	McDonell Central Catholic
1995	Xavier	Messmer	Racine Lutheran
1996	Pius XI	Racine Lutheran	Columbus Catholic
1997	Dominican	Messmer	Columbus Catholic
1998	Dominican	Racine Lutheran	N.E.W. Lutheran
1999	Marquette University	Lourdes Academy	Columbus Catholic
2000	Pius XI	Dominican	Columbus Catholic

Girls Basketball
Year	Champion		
1975	Roncalli		
1976	St. Catherine's		
1977	Milwaukee Lutheran		
1978	Xavier		
Year	Class A	Class B	
1979	St. Catherine's	Northwestern Prep	
1980	Pius XI	Columbus Catholic	
1981	Newman Catholic	Marinette Central Catholic	
1982	Pius XI	Marinette Central Catholic	
1983	Pius XI	Marinette Central Catholic	
1984	Pius XI	Marinette Central Catholic	
1985	Pius XI	Shoreland Lutheran	
1986	Pius XI	Regis	
1987	Pius XI	Lakeside Lutheran	
1988	Pius XI	Winnebago Lutheran	
1989	Pius XI	Shoreland Lutheran	
1990	Pius XI	Kettle Moraine Lutheran	
1991	Pius XI	Winnebago Lutheran	
Year	Division 1	Division 2	Division 3
1992	Pius XI	Regis	Marinette Central Catholic
1993	Pius XI	Regis	Marinette Central Catholic
1994	Wisconsin Lutheran	Lourdes Academy	Marinette Central Catholic
1995	Pius XI	Lourdes Academy	Marinette Central Catholic
1996	Divine Savior Holy Angels	Aquinas	Marinette Central Catholic
1997	Pius XI	Aquinas	Marinette Central Catholic
1998	Pius XI	St. Mary Catholic	Assumption
1999	Pius XI	Assumption	Columbus Catholic
2000	Pius XI	Dominican	Columbus Catholic

Boys Hockey
Year	Champion
1981	St. Mary's Springs
1982	St. Mary's Springs
1983	University School
1984	University School
1985	St. Mary's Springs
1986	St. Mary's Springs
1987	St. Mary's Springs
1988	Edgewood
1989	Edgewood
1990	Edgewood
1991	Edgewood
1992	University School
1993	Edgewood
1994	Edgewood
1995	Edgewood

Wrestling
Year	Champion
1969	Pius XI
1970	St. Catherine's
1971	Pius XI
1972	Pio Nono
1973	Pacelli
1974	Thomas More
1975	Thomas More
1976	Pacelli, Thomas More (tie)
1977	Pacelli
1978	St. Joseph
1979	Pius XI
1980	Marquette University
1981	Marquette University
1982	Marquette University
1983	Aquinas
1984	Pacelli
1985	Aquinas
1986	Aquinas
1987	Aquinas
1988	Aquinas
1989	Aquinas
1990	Aquinas
1991	Catholic Memorial
1992	Catholic Memorial
1993	Lourdes Academy
1994	Lourdes Academy
1995	Catholic Memorial
1996	Catholic Memorial
1997	Aquinas
1998	Catholic Memorial
1999	Aquinas
2000	Milwaukee Lutheran

=== Spring sports ===
Baseball
Year	Champion	
1969	Edgewood	
1970	St. Joseph	
1971	St. Catherine's	
1972	St. Catherine's	
1973	St. Catherine's	
1974	Pacelli	
1975	St. Catherine's	
1976	St. Catherine's	
1977	St. Joseph	
1978	Xavier	
1979	Xavier	
1980	Newman Catholic	
1981	Thomas More	
1982	Marquette University	
1983	Catholic Memorial	
1984	Aquinas	
1985	Aquinas	
Year	Class A	Class B
1986	Aquinas	Marinette Central Catholic
1987	Aquinas	Marinette Central Catholic
1988	St. Joseph	McDonell Central Catholic
1989	St. Catherine's	St Mary's (Burlington)
1990	Catholic Memorial	St. Mary Catholic
1991	Roncalli	Newman Catholic
Year	Division 1	Division 2
1992	Marquette University	Burlington Catholic Central
1993	Marquette University	Burlington Catholic Central
1994	Pius XI	Shoreland Lutheran
1995	Marquette University	Regis
1996	Thomas More	Burlington Catholic Central
1997	Marquette University	Racine Lutheran
Year	Champion	
1998	Pacelli	
1999	Burlington Catholic Central	
2000	Wisconsin Lutheran	

Golf
Year	Champion
1969	Milwaukee Lutheran
1970	Aquinas
1971	Campion Jesuit
1972	St. Joseph
1973	Roncalli
1974	Aquinas
Fall sport from 1974–1997
1998	Edgewood
1999	Wayland Academy
2000	Edgewood

Girls Soccer
Year	Champion
1987	Pius XI
1988	Divine Savior Holy Angels
1989	Pius XI
1990	Pius XI
1991	Pius XI
1992	Pius XI
1993	Divine Savior Holy Angels
1994	Pius XI
1995	Pius XI
1996	Catholic Memorial
1997	Pius XI
1998	Pius XI
1999	Catholic Memorial
2000	Catholic Memorial

Softball
Year	Champion	
1977	St. Catherine's	
1978	Milwaukee Lutheran	
1979	St. Joseph	
1980	Pius XI	
1981	Divine Savior Holy Angels	
1982	Dominican	
1983	Catholic Memorial	
1984	St. Joseph Academy	
1985	St. Mary's Academy	
Year	Class A	Class B
1986	Pius XI	St. Mary Catholic
1987	St. Joseph Academy	St. Mary's (Burlington)
1988	St. Joseph Academy	Shoreland Lutheran
1989	Pius XI	Martin Luther Prep
1990	Pius XI	St. Mary Catholic
1991	Pius XI	Burlington Catholic Central
Year	Division 1	Division 2
1992	Pius XI	Pacelli
1993	St. Catherine's	Pacelli
1994	St. Catherine's	Pacelli
1995	Pius XI	Pacelli
1996	Wisconsin Lutheran	Pacelli
1997	Wisconsin Lutheran	Pacelli
1998	Fox Valley Lutheran	Kettle Moraine Lutheran
1999	Wisconsin Lutheran	Kettle Moraine Lutheran
2000	Wisconsin Lutheran	Burlington Catholic Central

Boys Tennis
Year	Champion
1969	University School
1970	Campion Jesuit
1971	University School
1972	University School
1973	University School
1974	University School
1975	University School
1976	University School
1977	The Prairie School
1978	University School
1979	University School
1980	University School
1981	Marquette University
1982	Marquette University
1983	Marquette University
1984	Marquette University
1985	Marquette University
1986	Marquette University
1987	Abbot Pennings
1988	Marquette University
1989	Marquette University
1990	Marquette University
1991	Marquette University
1992	Marquette University
1993	Marquette University
1994	Marquette University
1995	Marquette University
1996	Marquette University
1997	Marquette University
1998	Marquette University
1999	Marquette University
2000	Roncalli

Boys Track & Field
Year	Class A	Class B	Class C
1969	Our Lady of Premontre	Lourdes Academy	Wayland Academy
1970	Pius XI	Roncalli	University School
1971	Pius XI	Newman Catholic	University School
1972	Pius XI	Beloit Catholic	University School
1973	Marquette University	Beloit Catholic	St. John (Little Chute)
1974	Pius XI	Roncalli	Holy Name Seminary
1975	Pius XI	St. Mary's Springs	University School
1976	Marquette University	Lourdes Academy	University School
1977	Marquette University	Lourdes Academy	St. John's Military Academy
1978	Pius XI	Pacelli	University School
1979	Pius XI	St. Mary's Springs	University School
1980	Our Lady of Premontre	Aquinas	Racine Lutheran
1981	Thomas More	Aquinas	Racine Lutheran
1982	Marquette University	Aquinas	Racine Lutheran
1983	Marquette University	Pacelli	Wayland Academy
1984	Marquette University	Xavier	St. John's Military Academy
1985	Marquette University	Xavier	Central Wisconsin Christian
1986	Marquette University	Lourdes Academy	McDonell Central Catholic
Year	Class A	Class B	
1987	Wisconsin Lutheran	Lourdes Academy	
1988	Marquette University	Regis	
1989	Marquette University	Regis	
1990	Marquette University	Lourdes Academy	
1991	Catholic Memorial	University School	
Year	Division 1	Division 2	
1992	Catholic Memorial	Columbus Catholic	
1993	Wisconsin Lutheran	St. Mary's Springs	
1994	Wisconsin Lutheran	Roncalli	
1995	Marquette University	Northwestern Prep	
1996	Catholic Memorial	St. Mary's Springs	
1997	Wisconsin Lutheran	St. Mary's Springs	
1998	Pius XI	St. Mary's Springs	
1999	Marquette University	Manitowoc Lutheran	
2000	Marquette University	St. Mary's Springs	

Girls Track & Field
Year	Champion		
1971	Newman Catholic		
1972	Wisconsin Lutheran		
1973	Wisconsin Lutheran		
1974	St. Mary's Academy		
1975	Roncalli		
Year	Class A	Class B	
1976	Aquinas	Luther	
1977	Aquinas	Luther	
1978	Aquinas	Winnebago Lutheran	
1979	Pius XI	Winnebago Lutheran	
Year	Class A	Class B	Class C
1980	Pius XI	Fox Valley Lutheran	Winnebago Lutheran
1981	Catholic Memorial	Aquinas	Luther
1982	Catholic Memorial	Assumption	Luther
1983	Pius XI	Fox Valley Lutheran	Manitowoc Lutheran
1984	Pius XI	McDonell Central Catholic	Manitowoc Lutheran
1985	Pius XI	Pacelli	Manitowoc Lutheran
1986	Pius XI	Pacelli	Manitowoc Lutheran
Year	Class A	Class B	
1987	Pius XI	Regis	
1988	Pius XI	Lourdes Academy	
1989	Pius XI	Winnebago Lutheran	
1990	Pius XI	Roncalli	
1991	Catholic Memorial	Winnebago Lutheran	
Year	Division 1	Division 2	
1992	Pius XI	Xavier	
1993	Catholic Memorial	Regis	
1994	Catholic Memorial	Manitowoc Lutheran	
1995	Catholic Memorial	St. Joseph	
1996	Catholic Memorial	Newman Catholic	
1997	Aquinas	Winnebago Lutheran	
1998	Wisconsin Lutheran	McDonell Central Catholic	
1999	Catholic Memorial	McDonell Central Catholic	
2000	Catholic Memorial	McDonell Central Catholic	
