= Classic Conference =

Wisconsin high school athletic conference (1973-1983)

The Classic Conference is a former high school athletic conference in Wisconsin. Consisting entirely of private schools during its ten year existence from 1973 to 1983, all member schools were affiliated with the Wisconsin Independent Schools Athletic Association.

== History ==
=== 1973–1978 ===
Location of Original Classic Conference Members

The Classic Conference was founded in 1973 by seven private high schools in southeastern Wisconsin: Central Wisconsin Christian in Waupun, de Sales Prep in St. Francis, Notre Dame in Milwaukee, Sheboygan Christian, St. Bonaventure in Sturtevant, St. John’s Military Academy in Delafield and University Lake School in Hartland. Notre Dame and St. Bonaventure were previously part of the Milwaukee Catholic Conference, and the other five schools were independents at the time of the Classic Conference’s formation. SJMA would only spend one season in the conference before joining the Midwest Prep Conference in 1974, and they were replaced by Maranatha Baptist Academy in Watertown. Shoreland Lutheran in Somers joined in 1975, and Brookfield Academy became members of the Classic Conference in 1976. They swapped affiliations with Maranatha Baptist Academy, who left to join the Indian Trails Conference. Kettle Moraine Lutheran in Jackson joined as full members in 1977 after becoming members in girls’ sports the year prior. The Prairie School in Wind Point also joined the conference, bringing membership in the Classic Conference to ten schools. This was KML’s first conference affiliation after opening a few years earlier, while The Prairie School came over from the Indian Trails Conference.

=== 1978–1983 ===
Location of Final Classic Conference Members

De Sales Preparatory Seminary closed its doors in 1979, and were immediately replaced by another Catholic seminary, St. Lawrence in Mount Calvary. Winnebago Lutheran Academy in Fond du Lac also joined the conference that year, bringing the roster to eleven members. Both schools were previously members of the Bay-Lakes Conference, which had disbanded the season before. In 1981, University Lake School left the Classic Conference to compete as an independent for one season prior to the formation of the Southern Wisconsin and Illinois Small Schools (SWISS) Conference in 1982. Sheboygan Lutheran joined the Classic Conference to take ULS’s place. The eleven schools would compete until 1983, when a merger agreement was reached with the Midwest Prep Conference. All but two schools in the conference joined the new Midwest Classic Conference for the 1983-84 school year, with Brookfield Academy competing as an independent before entering the SWISS Conference in 1984 and St. Bonaventure High School closing its doors after over eighty years of operation.

== Conference membership history ==
=== Final members ===
| School | Location | Affiliation | Mascot | Colors | Joined | Left | Conference Joined | Current Conference |
|---|---|---|---|---|---|---|---|---|
| Brookfield Academy | Brookfield, WI | Private (Nonsectarian) | Blue Knights | | 1976 | 1983 | Independent | Midwest Classic |
| Central Wisconsin Christian | Waupun, WI | Private (Reformed) | Crusaders | | 1973 | 1983 | Midwest Classic | Trailways |
| Kettle Moraine Lutheran | Jackson, WI | Private (WELS) | Chargers | | 1977 | 1983 | Midwest Classic | Glacier Trails |
| Notre Dame | Milwaukee, WI | Private (Catholic) | Redwings | | 1973 | 1983 | Midwest Classic | Closed in 1988 |
| Sheboygan Christian | Sheboygan, WI | Private (Christian) | Eagles | | 1973 | 1983 | Midwest Classic | Big East |
| Sheboygan Lutheran | Sheboygan, WI | Private (LCMS) | Crusaders | | 1981 | 1983 | Midwest Classic | Big East |
| Shoreland Lutheran | Somers, WI | Private (WELS) | Pacers | | 1975 | 1983 | Midwest Classic | Metro Classic |
| St. Bonaventure | Sturtevant, WI | Private (Catholic) | Cardinals | | 1973 | 1983 | Closed in 1983 | |
| St. Lawrence Seminary | Mount Calvary, WI | Private (Catholic, Capuchin) | Hilltoppers | | 1979 | 1983 | Midwest Classic | Wisconsin Flyway |
| The Prairie School | Wind Point, WI | Private (Nonsectarian) | Hawks | | 1977 | 1983 | Midwest Classic | Metro Classic |
| Winnebago Lutheran | Fond du Lac, WI | Private (WELS) | Vikings | | 1979 | 1983 | Midwest Classic | Wisconsin Flyway |

=== Previous members ===
| School | Location | Affiliation | Mascot | Colors | Joined | Left | Conference Joined | Current Conference |
|---|---|---|---|---|---|---|---|---|
| de Sales Preparatory Seminary | St. Francis, WI | Private (Catholic) | Saints | | 1973 | 1979 | Closed | |
| Maranatha Baptist Academy | Watertown, WI | Private (Baptist) | Crusaders | | 1974 | 1976 | Indian Trails | |
| St. John's Military Academy | Delafield, WI | Private (Nonsectarian, Military) | Lancers | | 1973 | 1974 | Midwest Prep | Midwest Classic |
| University Lake School | Hartland, WI | Private (Nonsectarian) | Lakers | | 1973 | 1981 | Independent | Lake City |

== List of state champions ==
=== Fall sports ===
Boys Cross Country
| School | Year | Organization | Division |
|---|---|---|---|
| Central Wisconsin Christian | 1978 | WISAA | Class C |

Boys Soccer
| School | Year | Organization |
|---|---|---|
| Notre Dame | 1977 | WISAA |
| University Lake School | 1978 | WISAA |

Girls Tennis
| School | Year | Organization |
|---|---|---|
| The Prairie School | 1980 | WISAA |

=== Winter sports ===
Boys Basketball
| School | Year | Organization | Division |
|---|---|---|---|
| Notre Dame | 1976 | WISAA | Class B |
| Notre Dame | 1978 | WISAA | Class B |
| Notre Dame | 1979 | WISAA | Class B |
| Central Wisconsin Christian | 1980 | WISAA | Class B |
| Sheboygan Christian | 1981 | WISAA | Class B |
| The Prairie School | 1982 | WISAA | Class B |

=== Spring sports ===
Girls Track & Field
| School | Year | Organization | Division |
|---|---|---|---|
| Winnebago Lutheran | 1980 | WISAA | Class C |

== List of conference champions ==
=== Boys Basketball ===
| School | Quantity | Years |
|---|---|---|
| Notre Dame | 6 | 1975, 1976, 1977, 1978, 1979, 1982 |
| Central Wisconsin Christian | 3 | 1980, 1982, 1983 |
| The Prairie School | 3 | 1980, 1981, 1983 |
| St. Bonaventure | 1 | 1974 |
| Brookfield Academy | 0 | |
| de Sales Prep | 0 | |
| Kettle Moraine Lutheran | 0 | |
| Maranatha Baptist Academy | 0 | |
| Sheboygan Christian | 0 | |
| Sheboygan Lutheran | 0 | |
| Shoreland Lutheran | 0 | |
| St. John’s Military Academy | 0 | |
| St. Lawrence Seminary | 0 | |
| University Lake School | 0 | |
| Winnebago Lutheran | 0 | |

=== Girls Basketball ===
| School | Quantity | Years |
|---|---|---|
| Winnebago Lutheran | 2 | 1980, 1982 |
| Brookfield Academy | 1 | 1983 |
| Central Wisconsin Christian | 1 | 1981 |
| Shoreland Lutheran | 1 | 1982 |
| Kettle Moraine Lutheran | 0 | |
| Maranatha Baptist Academy | 0 | |
| Notre Dame | 0 | |
| Sheboygan Christian | 0 | |
| Sheboygan Lutheran | 0 | |
| St. Bonaventure | 0 | |
| The Prairie School | 0 | |
| University Lake School | 0 | |
Champions pre-1980 unknown
