= SWISS Conference =

Wisconsin and Illinois high school athletic conference (1982-2006)

The Southern Wisconsin and Illinois Small Schools Conference, more commonly referred to as the SWISS Conference, is a former high school athletic conference. It was in existence from 1982 to 2006, and consisted primarily of private schools in southern Wisconsin and northern Illinois.

== History ==
=== 1982–1996 ===
Location of Original SWISS Conference Members

The SWISS Conference was formed in 1982 by five small private high schools in Wisconsin and Illinois: Heritage Christian School in New Berlin, Keith Country Day School in Rockford, Parkway Christian Academy in Oak Creek, University Lake School in Hartland and Waukegan Christian School. Faith Christian School in Williams Bay became the sixth member of the SWISS Conference in 1983, and the arrival of Brookfield Academy brought the membership total to seven schools the next year. In 1989, two years after attaining membership in the Wisconsin Independent Schools Athletic Association, Heritage Christian School left the SWISS Conference for membership in the Midwest Classic Conference. Christian Life School in Kenosha replaced them that same year. In 1990, the SWISS Conference added three new members: Abundant Life Christian School in Madison, Berean Baptist Christian School in Rockford and Wisconsin School for the Deaf in Delavan.

=== 1996–2006 ===
Location of Final SWISS Conference Members

The SWISS Conference would remain at ten members until 1996, when Brookfield Academy was invited to join the Midwest Classic Conference. In 2005, Christian Life exited for membership in the Midwest Classic Conference and Parkway Christian Academy joined the Indian Trails Conference, bringing membership down to six schools. The SWISS Conference was disbanded in 2006, and its member schools were dispersed to other conference. Wisconsin School for the Deaf rejoined the Indian Trails Conference in 2006. The other two Wisconsin-based members of the SWISS Conference (Faith Christian School and University Lake School) and two of the three Illinois-based schools (Berean Baptist and Keith Country Day) became members of the Indian Trails Conference in 2007 after competing as independents. The final school, Westlake Christian Academy in Grayslake, also competed as an independent.

== Conference membership history ==
=== Final members ===
School	Location	Affiliation	Mascot	Colors	Joined	Left	Conference Joined	Current Conference
Berean Baptist Christian	Rockford, IL	Private (Baptist)	Kingsmen		1990	2006	Independent	Illinois Association of Christian Schools
Faith Christian	Williams Bay, WI	Private (Nondenominational Christian)	Eagles		1983	2006	Independent	Lake City
Keith Country Day	Rockford, IL	Private (Nonsectarian)	Cougars		1982	2006	Independent	Northeastern Athletic (IHSA)
University Lake School	Hartland, WI	Private (Nonsectarian)	Lakers		1982	2006	Independent	Lake City
Westlake Christian	Grayslake, IL	Private (Nondenominational Christian)	Eagles		1982	2006	Independent	Northeastern Athletic (IHSA)
Wisconsin School for the Deaf	Delavan, WI	Public (State, Special Needs)	Firebirds		1990	2006	Indian Trails	

=== Previous members ===
School	Location	Affiliation	Mascot	Colors	Joined	Left	Conference Joined	Current Conference
Abundant Life Christian	Madison, WI	Private (Nondenominational Christian)	Challengers		1990	2001	Trailways	
Brookfield Academy	Brookfield, WI	Private (Nonsectarian)	Blue Knights		1984	1996	Midwest Classic	
Christian Life	Kenosha, WI	Private (Nondenominational Christian)	Eagles		1989	2005	Midwest Classic	
Heritage Christian	New Berlin, WI	Private (Protestant)	Patriots		1982	1989	Midwest Classic	
Parkway Christian	Oak Creek, WI	Private (Baptist)	Flames		1982	2005	Indian Trails	Closed in 2009

== List of state champions ==
=== Fall sports ===
Girls Tennis
School	Year	Organization
Brookfield Academy	1987	WISAA

=== Winter sports ===
None

=== Spring sports ===
None
