= Indian Trails Conference =

Wisconsin high school athletic conference

The Indian Trails Conference is a high school athletic conference with its membership concentrated in southeastern Wisconsin. Originally founded as a conference for small public high schools in 1963, it has seen a high level of turnover among membership over the course of its history and is no longer affiliated with the WIAA.

== History ==
=== 1963-1969 ===
Location of Original Indian Trails Conference Members

The Indian Trails Conference was formed in 1963 by four local public high schools, one state-run public high school and one private high school. The four local public schools (Clinton, Norris Foundation, Palmyra and Williams Bay) were former members of the Southeastern Wisconsin Conference, and the two others (Northwestern Military & Naval Academy, Wisconsin School for the Deaf) competed as independents after their former conference, the Southern Wisconsin Association of Private Schools (SWAPS) Conference, disbanded in 1961. Competition began in spring 1963 with a full baseball schedule. The Indian Trails Conference would compete in this configuration for six years, which to date has been the longest period of stability for conference membership.

=== 1969-1980 ===
The late 1960s and early 1970s marked a transition for the Indian Trails Conference from a conference with mostly public high schools to one with mostly small private high schools. In 1969, Clinton and Palmyra left the Indian Trails Conference to join the Central Suburban and Eastern Suburban Conferences, respectively. They were replaced by three private schools: Brookfield Academy, Rockford Lutheran and The Prairie School in Wind Point. Williams Bay left to follow Palmyra into the Eastern Suburban Conference in 1970, and were replaced by Divine Word Seminary in East Troy. St. Joseph Seminary in Edgerton joined in 1971, and Rockford Lutheran left the following year to join the Northwest Seven Conference in Illinois. They were replaced by Ethan Allen School for Boys, a reform school in Wales, in 1973. Brookfield Academy left to join the Classic Conference in 1976 and were replaced by Maranatha Baptist Academy in Watertown, who has to date been the conference's longest tenured member. The Prairie School followed Brookfield Academy to Classic Conference membership in 1977, and in 1979, St. John's School for the Deaf in St. Francis joined the Indian Trails Conference.

=== 1980-2004 ===
The 1980s brought continued instability for Indian Trails Conference membership. St. Joseph Seminary left the Indian Trails when they closed their doors in 1980, followed by Norris Foundation in 1982 after they dropped interscholastic athletics. St. John's School for the Deaf was closed by the Roman Catholic Archdiocese of Milwaukee in 1983 after running at a deficit for several years made operation of the school unsustainable. In 1986, Messmer High School in Milwaukee, which had returned from nearly closing two years prior, joined the Indian Trails Conference, and there would be a short period of membership stability that lasted until the 1990s. Changes occurred on a somewhat regular basis during this decade, the first of these was the addition of Alden-Hebron High School in Illinois and Calvary Baptist Christian School in Sun Prairie to the conference in 1990. They replaced Wisconsin School for the Deaf, who left to join the Southern Wisconsin and Illinois Small Schools (SWISS) Conference as full members. The Indian Trails Conference lost Divine Word Seminary when it was announced that they would cease operations in 1991. Calvary Baptist School in Menomonee Falls and Waukesha Christian Academy joined the Indian Trails in 1993, replacing Messmer after their exit to join the Midwest Classic Conference. In 1994, Wayland Academy in Beaver Dam joined as full members after years of splitting boys and girls athletics between the Indian Trails and Midwest Classic Conferences. The next year, Northwestern Military & Naval Academy would merge with St. John's Military Academy in Delafield, with their successor taking St. John's place in the Midwest Classic Conference. Wayland Academy left to return to the Midwest Classic Conference in 1996 and were replaced by two schools: Beloit Catholic and Oshkosh Christian. Union Grove Christian joined the next year and were followed by Rock County Christian of Beloit in 1998. The next year, Victory Christian School in Neosho would replace Oshkosh Christian after their exit, and membership subdivided into North and South Divisions:

North Division	South Division
Calvary Baptist	Alden-Hebron
Calvary Baptist Christian	Beloit Catholic
Ethan Allen School for Boys	Rock County Christian
Maranatha Baptist Academy	Union Grove Christian
Victory Christian Academy	Waukesha Christian Academy

The Indian Trails reformed as a single division after one year of this alignment and welcomed Grace Christian Academy of West Allis into the conference that same year. They replaced Beloit Catholic, who was closed by the Madison diocese in 2000. In 2001, Reuther Central High School, a public alternative high school in Kenosha, joined the Indian Trails Conference. Two years later, Calvary Baptist Christian in Sun Prairie would leave the conference with Rockford Christian School in Illinois taking their place.

=== 2004-2021 ===
In 2004, the Indian Trails Conference split its eleven members into Blue and Gold Divisions:

Blue Division	Gold Division
Alden-Hebron	Calvary Baptist
Ethan Allen School for Boys	Grace Christian Academy
Kenosha Reuther Central	Rock County Christian
Maranatha Baptist Academy	Union Grove Christian
Rockford Christian	Victory Christian Academy
	Waukesha Christian Academy

The near-annual turnover of conference membership continued in 2005 with Victory Christian Academy leaving the conference and Parkway Christian Academy in Milwaukee joining from the SWISS Conference as a replacement. Waukesha Christian Academy would leave the conference the next year and were replaced by the return of Wisconsin School for the Deaf, who were displaced by the ending of the SWISS Conference. In 2007, four former SWISS Conference members would enter the Indian Trails Conference: Berean Christian School and Keith Country Day School of Rockford, Faith Christian School out of Williams Bay and University Lake School in Delafield. Trinity Academy in Pewaukee also joined the conference, and this was the divisional alignment for its sixteen members after the merger:

Blue Division	Gold Division
Alden-Hebron	Calvary Baptist
Berean Christian	Grace Christian Academy
Ethan Allen School for Boys	Parkway Christian Academy
Faith Christian	Rock County Christian
Keith Country Day	Trinity Academy
Kenosha Reuther Central	Union Grove Christian
Maranatha Baptist Academy	University Lake School
Rockford Christian	Wisconsin School for the Deaf

Christian Liberty Academy in Arlington Heights and Mooseheart Academy joined the Blue Division in 2008 as full members (Mooseheart had previously been a football-only member), but their stay in the conference was short lived. In 2009, the six Illinois-based schools in the conference would all leave, and five of those schools (Alden-Hebron, Christian Liberty, Keith Country Day, Mooseheart Academy and Rockford Christian) would join the newly created Northeastern Athletic Conference, a conference sponsored by the Illinois High School Association. Additionally, Parkway Christian Academy in Oak Creek closed its doors, bringing membership in the Indian Trails to eleven schools. Because most of the exiting schools were all members of the Blue Division, further conference realignment was made necessary with Calvary Baptist and University Lake School moving over to the Blue Division:

Blue Division	Gold Division
Calvary Baptist	Grace Christian Academy
Ethan Allen School for Boys	Rock County Christian
Faith Christian	Trinity Academy
Kenosha Reuther Central	Union Grove Christian
Maranatha Baptist Academy	Wisconsin School for the Deaf
University Lake School	

2010 saw the addition of Eastbrook Academy in Milwaukee and Mountain Top Christian Academy in Horicon join the Blue Division of the Indian Trails Conference. The next year, Ethan Allen School for Boys was closed by the Wisconsin Department of Corrections and juvenile facilities were moved to Lincoln Hills School, just outside of Merrill in the northern part of the state. Mountain Top Christian Academy would move to the Gold Division in 2012 to accommodate the entry of Salam, an Islamic school in Milwaukee, into the conference. St. Anthony High School in Milwaukee joined the Blue Division in 2013, and Early View Academy joined the Gold Division in 2014. They replaced Trinity Academy, who ended their stand-alone athletic program and entered into a cooperative agreement with nearby University Lake School. In 2016, Calvary Baptist and Salam would exit the Indian Trails Conference, and were replaced by Tenor/Veritas, a cooperative athletic program between two charter schools in Milwaukee. Eastbrook Academy also moved to the Gold Division that year, and in 2017, Mountain Top Christian moved to the Blue Division. Two schools joined the conference in 2018: Academy of Excellence and Chesterton Academy, both out of Milwaukee. They replaced Union Grove Christian, who left the Indian Trails Conference in 2018. From 2018 to 2021, the alignment of schools in the Indian Trails Conference featured an imbalanced format with the Blue Division having more schools than the Gold Division:

Blue Division	Gold Division
Academy of Excellence	Chesterton Academy
Faith Christian	Early View Academy
Kenosha Reuther Central	Eastbrook Academy
Maranatha Baptist Academy	Grace Christian Academy
Mountain Top Christian	Rock County Christian
St. Anthony	Wisconsin School for the Deaf
Tenor/Veritas	
University Lake School/Trinity Academy	

=== 2021-present ===
In 2021, six athletic programs (Early View Academy, Eastbrook Academy, Faith Christian, St. Anthony, Tenor/Veritas and University Lake/Trinity) would leave the Indian Trails Conference to form the new nine-member Lake City Conference (along with independents Augustine Prep, Cristo Rey Jesuit and Salam). The remaining seven programs were joined by the return of Waukesha Christian Academy to the Indian Trails under a single division alignment. In 2024, Early View Academy rejoined the Indian Trails after a three-year stint in the Lake City Conference. The following year, Oakhill Christian School in Janesville became the tenth full member of the Indian Trails Conference.

== List of conference members ==
=== Current full members ===
School	Location	Affililation	Enrollment	Mascot	Colors	Joined
Academy of Excellence	Milwaukee, WI	Private (Christian)	N/A	Warriors		2018
Early View Academy	Milwaukee, WI	Private (Christian)	101	Eagles		2014, 2024
Grace Christian Academy	West Allis, WI	Private (Christian)	37	Crusaders		2000
Maranatha Baptist Academy	Watertown, WI	Private (Baptist)	65	Crusaders		1976
Mountain Top Christian Academy	Horicon, WI	Private (Christian)	11	Cougars		2010
Oakhill Christian	Janesville, WI	Private (Baptist)	10	Royals		2025
Reuther Central	Kenosha, WI	Public, Alternative	354	Bulldogs		2001
Rock County Christian	Beloit, WI	Private (Christian)	77	Eagles		1998
Waukesha Christian Academy	Waukesha, WI	Private (Baptist)	8	Warriors		1993, 2021
Wisconsin School for the Deaf	Delavan, WI	State, Special Needs	N/A	Firebirds		1963, 2006

=== Former full members ===
School	Location	Affiliation	Mascot	Colors	Joined	Left	Conference Joined	Current Conference
Alden-Hebron	Hebron, IL	Public	Giants		1990	2009	Northeastern Athletic (IHSA)	
Beloit Catholic	Beloit, WI	Private (Catholic)	Crusaders		1996	2000	Closed in 2000	
Berean Christian	Rockford, IL	Private (Baptist)	Kingsmen		2007	2009	Illinois Association of Christian Schools	
Brookfield Academy	Brookfield, WI	Private (Nonsectarian)	Blue Knights		1969	1976	Classic	Midwest Classic
Calvary Baptist	Menomonee Falls, WI	Private (Baptist)	Eagles		1993	2016	Independent	Closed in 2024
Calvary Baptist Christian	Sun Prairie, WI	Private (Baptist)	Eagles		1990	2003	Independent	Closed in 2008
Chesterton Academy	Menomonee Falls, WI	Private (Catholic)	Knights		2018	2021	Independent	Lake City
Christian Liberty Academy	Arlington Heights, IL	Private (Christian)	Chargers		2008	2009	Northeastern Athletic (IHSA)	Illinois Association of Christian Schools
Clinton	Clinton, WI	Public	Cougars		1963	1969	Central Suburban	Rock Valley
Divine Word Seminary	East Troy, WI	Private (Catholic)	Titans		1970	1991	Closed in 1991	
Eastbrook Academy	Milwaukee, WI	Private (Christian)	Warriors		2010	2021	Lake City	
Ethan Allen School for Boys	Wales, WI	State, Juvenile Detention	Green Mountain Boys		1973	2011	Closed in 2011	
Faith Christian	Williams Bay, WI	Private (Christian)	Eagles		2007	2021	Lake City	
Keith Country Day	Rockford, IL	Private (Nonsectarian)	Cougars		2007	2009	Northeastern Athletic (IHSA)	
Messmer	Milwaukee, WI	Private (Catholic)	Bishops		1986	1993	Midwest Classic	
Mooseheart Academy	Mooseheart, IL	Private (Nonsectarian)	Red Ramblers		2008	2009	Northeastern Athletic (IHSA)	
Norris Foundation	Mukwonago, WI	Public, Alternative	Nors'men		1963	1982	Discontinued interscholastic athletics	
Northwestern Military & Naval Academy	Lake Geneva, WI	Private (Nonsectarian), Military	Falcons		1963	1995	Merged with St. John's Military Academy	
Oshkosh Christian	Oshkosh, WI	Private (Christian)	Eagles		1996	1999	Independent	Closed in 2000 (merged into Valley Christian)
Palmyra	Palmyra, WI	Public	Panthers		1963	1969	Eastern Suburban	Trailways
Parkway Christian Academy	Oak Creek, WI	Private (Christian)	Flames		2005	2009	Closed in 2009	
Rockford Christian	Rockford, IL	Private (Christian)	Royal Lions		2003	2009	Northeastern Athletic (IHSA)	Big Northern (IHSA)
Rockford Lutheran	Rockford, IL	Private (Lutheran, LCMS & ELCA)	Crusaders		1969	1972	Northwest Seven (IHSA)	Big Northern (IHSA)
Salam	Milwaukee, WI	Private (Islamic)	Stars		2012	2016	Independent	Lake City
St. Anthony	Milwaukee, WI	Private (Catholic)	Roman Legion		2013	2021	Lake City	
St. John's School for the Deaf	St. Francis, WI	Private (Catholic), Special Needs	Eagles		1979	1983	Closed in 1983	
St. Joseph Seminary	Edgerton, WI	Private (Catholic)	Johawks		1971	1980	Closed in 1980	
Tenor/Veritas	Milwaukee, WI	Public, Charter	Titans		2016	2021	Lake City	
The Prairie School	Wind Point, WI	Private (Nonsectarian)	Hawks		1969	1977	Classic	Metro Classic
Trinity Academy	Pewaukee, WI	Private (Catholic)	Sentinels		2007	2021	Lake City	
Union Grove Christian	Union Grove, WI	Private (Christian)	Cougars		1997	2018	Closed in 2018	
University Lake School	Delafield, WI	Private (Nonsectarian)	Lakers		2007	2021	Lake City	
Victory Christian	Neosho, WI	Private (Christian)	Warriors		1999	2005	Independent	Closed in 2009
Wayland Academy	Beaver Dam, WI	Private (Nonsectarian)	Big Red		1994	1996	Midwest Classic	Trailways
Williams Bay	Williams Bay, WI	Public	Bulldogs		1963	1970	Eastern Suburban	Trailways

=== Former football-only members ===
School	Location	Affiliation	Mascot	Colors	Seasons	Primary Conference
Beloit Catholic	Beloit, WI	Private (Catholic)	Crusaders		1994	Rock Valley
Brookfield Academy	Brookfield, WI	Private (Nonsectarian)	Blue Knights		1976-1989, 2007	Classic, SWISS, Midwest Classic
Kirkland-Hiawatha	Kirkland, IL	Public	Hawks		2008	Little Ten (IHSA)
Lake Forest Academy	Lake Forest, IL	Private (Nonsectarian)	Caxys		1993-2004, 2008	Independent School League (IHSA)
Mooseheart Academy	Mooseheart, IL	Private (Nonsectarian)	Red Ramblers		1993-2007	Tollway Athletic (IHSA)
North Shore Country Day	Winnetka, IL	Private (Nonsectarian)	Raiders		1993-2008	Independent School League (IHSA)
Rockford Christian	Rockford, IL	Private (Christian)	Royal Lions		2002	Private School League (IHSA)
Wayland Academy	Beaver Dam, WI	Private (Nonsectarian)	Big Red		2005-2008	Midwest Classic
Williams Bay	Williams Bay, WI	Public	Bulldogs		1993-2005	Eastern Suburban, Trailways
Wisconsin School for the Deaf	Delavan, WI	State, Special Needs	Firebirds		1990-1992, 1997-2001	SWISS

== Membership timeline ==
=== Full members ===
North Division South Division Blue Division Gold Division

== Membership map ==
Indian Trails Conference
Location of Indian Trails Conference full members:
1 Academy of Excellence
2 Early View Academy
3 Grace Christian Academy
4 Kenosha Reuther Central
5 Maranatha Baptist Academy
6 Mountain Top Christian Academy
7 Rock County Christian
8 Waukesha Christian Academy
9 Wisconsin School for the Deaf

== Sponsored sports ==
	Boys Basketball	Girls Basketball	Boys Soccer	Girls Volleyball
Academy of Excellence	●	●	●	●
Early View Academy	●			●
Grace Christian Academy	●	●	●	●
Maranatha Baptist Academy	●	●	●	●
Mountain Top Christian	●	●		●
Oakhill Christian	●			●
Reuther Central	●	●		
Rock County Christian	●	●		●
Waukesha Christian Academy	●			●
Wisconsin School for the Deaf	●	●		●

== List of state champions ==
=== Fall sports ===
None

=== Winter sports ===
Boys Basketball
School	Year	Organization	Division
Messmer	1987	WISAA	Class B
Messmer	1988	WISAA	Class B
Messmer	1989	WISAA	Class B

=== Spring sports ===
Boys Tennis
School	Year	Organization
The Prairie School	1977	WISAA

== List of conference champions ==
=== Boys Basketball ===
School	Quantity	Years
Maranatha Baptist Academy	11	1978, 1979, 1990, 1992, 1993, 1994, 1995, 2000, 2022, 2023, 2024
Ethan Allen School for Boys	9	1980, 1981, 1982, 1983, 1984, 1985, 1986, 2002, 2008
Calvary Baptist	7	1998, 1999, 2004, 2005, 2008, 2009, 2010
Reuther Central	7	2003, 2007, 2009, 2010, 2011, 2015, 2016
Messmer	6	1987, 1988, 1989, 1990, 1991, 1992
Rock County Christian	6	2012, 2015, 2018, 2020, 2025, 2026
The Prairie School	6	1972, 1973, 1974, 1975, 1976, 1977
Faith Christian	5	2012, 2013, 2014, 2016, 2019
Clinton	4	1964, 1965, 1966, 1967
Mountain Top Christian	4	2016, 2017, 2018, 2020
Early View Academy	3	2014, 2019, 2020
Williams Bay	3	1968, 1969, 1970
Brookfield Academy	2	1971, 1972
Rockford Christian	2	2005, 2006
Rockford Lutheran	2	1970, 1972
Union Grove Christian	2	2001, 2006
Alden-Hebron	1	2007
Beloit Catholic	1	1997
Eastbrook Academy	1	2017
Northwestern Military & Naval Academy	1	1971
Parkway Christian Academy	1	2007
Trinity Academy	1	2013
Wayland Academy	1	1996
Wisconsin School for the Deaf	1	2011
Academy of Excellence	0	
Berean Christian	0	
Calvary Baptist Christian	0	
Chesterton Academy	0	
Christian Liberty Academy	0	
Divine Word Seminary	0	
Grace Christian Academy	0	
Keith Country Day	0	
Mooseheart Academy	0	
Norris Foundation	0	
Oakhill Christian	0	
Oshkosh Christian	0	
Palmyra	0	
Salam	0	
St. Anthony	0	
St. John's School for the Deaf	0	
St. Joseph Seminary	0	
Tenor/Veritas	0	
University Lake School	0	
Victory Christian	0	
Waukesha Christian Academy	0	

=== Girls Basketball ===
School	Quantity	Years
Mountain Top Christian	7	2012, 2014, 2015, 2016, 2018, 2023, 2025
Maranatha Baptist Academy	6	2003, 2004, 2017, 2022, 2024, 2026
University Lake School	6	2011, 2013, 2014, 2015, 2019, 2020
Alden-Hebron	5	1993, 1994, 1995, 1997, 2007
Faith Christian	5	2008, 2009, 2010, 2012, 2016
Trinity Academy	4	2009, 2010, 2011, 2013
Beloit Catholic	3	1998, 1999, 2000
Eastbrook Academy	3	2017, 2018, 2020
Rock County Christian	3	2007, 2008, 2023
Grace Christian Academy	2	2005, 2006
Victory Christian	2	2001, 2002
Rockford Christian	1	2009
Wayland Academy	1	1993
Wisconsin School for the Deaf	1	2019
Academy of Excellence	0	
Berean Christian	0	
Calvary Baptist	0	
Calvary Baptist Christian	0	
Chesterton Academy	0	
Christian Liberty Academy	0	
Early View Academy	0	
Keith Country Day	0	
Reuther Central	0	
Messmer	0	
Mooseheart Academy	0	
Oakhill Christian	0	
Oshkosh Christian	0	
Parkway Christian Academy	0	
Salam	0	
St. Anthony	0	
Tenor/Veritas	0	
Union Grove Christian	0	
Waukesha Christian Academy	0	

=== Football ===
School	Quantity	Years
Williams Bay	9	1965, 1966, 1969, 1993, 1995, 1997, 1999, 2001, 2002
Wisconsin School for the Deaf	8	1972, 1974, 1975, 1976, 1977, 1979, 1983, 1987
Brookfield Academy	7	1970, 1971, 1978, 1980, 1981, 1982, 1988
Alden-Hebron	3	1991, 2005, 2006
Ethan Allen School for Boys	3	1984, 1985, 1986
Maranatha Baptist Academy	3	1998, 2003, 2007
Palmyra	3	1965, 1967, 1968
Clinton	2	1963, 1964
Norris Foundation	2	1971, 1973
North Shore Country Day	2	2001, 2002
Lake Forest Academy	1	1994
Mooseheart Academy	1	1996
Northwestern Military & Naval Academy	1	1983
Wayland Academy	1	2008
Beloit Catholic	0	
Divine Word Seminary	0	
Kirkland-Hiawatha	0	
Rockford Christian	0	
Rockford Lutheran	0	
Champions from 1989, 1990, 1992, 2000 and 2004 unknown
