= Wisconsin Catholic Interscholastic Athletic Association =

Former high school sports governing body

- Founded: 1957
- Ceased: 1968
- No. of teams: 34(1957), 41(1968)
- Headquarters: La Crosse, Wisconsin

Locations

WCIAA Member School Locations (1957)

The Wisconsin Catholic Interscholastic Athletic Association is a former organization for high school athletics in Wisconsin. Its membership consisted entirely of parochial high schools, and was in operation from 1957 to 1968.

== History ==
The origins of the Wisconsin Catholic Interscholastic Athletic Association date back to 1928, when Marquette University in Milwaukee sponsored a basketball tournament for the state's Catholic high schools. This was the first such competition in the state, and it eventually became an annual event. In 1957, the thirty-four Catholic high schools participating in that year's tournament assembled to form the Wisconsin Catholic Interscholastic Athletic Association. At the time of the WCIAA's founding, the Wisconsin Interscholastic Athletic Association limited its membership to public high schools, and the WCIAA gave parochial schools the chance to compete for statewide championships. Over the course of its eleven-year existence, the WCIAA sponsored championships for:

- Baseball
- Basketball
- Cross Country
- Golf
- Tennis
- Track and Field
- Wrestling

By the late 1960s, many new independent high schools had opened up in the state of Wisconsin that were outside the Catholic church, sponsored either by other religions or private entities. The forty-one members of the WCIAA added twelve non-Catholic high schools in 1968 (along with Queen of Apostles, a Catholic high school in Madison who was already slated to join) and became the Wisconsin Independent Schools Athletic Association to reflect its expanded scope.

== Executive Directors ==
- Phil Schrempf (1957–1959)
- Steve Pavela (1959–1968)

== WCIAA membership history ==
School	Location	Diocese	Enrollment	Mascot	Colors	Joined	Left	Current Status
Abbot Pennings	De Pere	Green Bay	N/A	Squires		1957	1968	Closed in 1990 (merged into Notre Dame Academy)
Aquinas	La Crosse	La Crosse	307	Blugolds		1957	1968	WIAA (Mississippi Valley)
Assumption	Wisconsin Rapids	La Crosse	139	Royals		1957	1968	WIAA (Marawood)
Beloit Catholic	Beloit	Madison	N/A	Crusaders		1957	1968	Closed in 2000
Campion Jesuit	Prairie du Chien	La Crosse	N/A	Red Knights		1957	1968	Closed in 1975
Cathedral	Superior	Superior	N/A	Panthers		1957	1968	Closed in 1969
Catholic Memorial	Waukesha	Milwaukee	576	Crusaders		1957	1968	WIAA (Classic Eight)
Columbus Catholic	Marshfield	La Crosse	146	Dons		1957	1968	WIAA (Cloverbelt)
De Padua	Ashland	Superior	N/A	Bruins		1957	1967	Closed
Don Bosco	Milwaukee	Milwaukee	N/A	Dons		1957	1968	Closed in 1972 (merged into Thomas More)
Edgewood	Madison	Madison	569	Crusaders		1957	1968	WIAA (Badger)
Madonna	Mauston	La Crosse	N/A	Cowboys		1957	1966	Closed
Marinette Central Catholic	Marinette	Green Bay	38	Cavaliers		1957	1968	WIAA (Marinette & Oconto)
Marquette University	Milwaukee	Milwaukee	1,794	Hilltoppers		1957	1968	WIAA (Greater Metro)
Maryheart	Pittsville	La Crosse	N/A	Golden Eagles		1957	1961	Closed
McDonell Central Catholic	Chippewa Falls	La Crosse	206	Macks		1957	1968	WIAA (Cloverbelt)
Messmer	Milwaukee	Milwaukee	499	Bishops		1957	1968	WIAA (Midwest Classic)
Newman Catholic	Wausau	La Crosse	128	Cardinals		1957	1968	WIAA (Marawood)
Notre Dame	Milwaukee	Milwaukee	N/A	Redwings		1957	1968	Closed in 1988
Our Lady of Premontre	Green Bay	Green Bay	N/A	Cadets		1957	1968	Closed in 1990 (merged into Notre Dame Academy)
Pacelli	Stevens Point	La Crosse	169	Cardinals		1957	1968	WIAA (Central Wisconsin)
Pius XI	Milwaukee	Milwaukee	699	Popes		1957	1968	WIAA (Woodland)
Regis	Eau Claire	La Crosse	210	Ramblers		1957	1968	WIAA (Cloverbelt)
Sacred Heart	Lima	La Crosse	N/A	Redmen		1957	1966	Closed
St. Benedict the Moor	Milwaukee	Milwaukee	N/A	Brown Bombers		1957	1964	Closed
St. Bonaventure	Sturtevant	Milwaukee	N/A	Cardinals		1957	1968	Closed in 1983
St. Catherine's	Racine	Milwaukee	472	Angels		1957	1968	WIAA (Metro Classic)
St. Gregory	St. Nazianz	Green Bay	N/A	Knights		1957	1968	Closed in 1969
St. John	Little Chute	Green Bay	N/A	Flying Dutchmen		1957	1968	Closed in 1973
St. John's Cathedral	Milwaukee	Milwaukee	N/A	Eagles		1957	1968	Closed in 1976
St. Mary	Kenosha	Milwaukee	N/A	Blue Knights		1957	1958	Closed
St. Mary Catholic	Neenah	Green Bay	277	Zephyrs		1957	1968	WIAA (Big East)
St. Mary's	Burlington	Milwaukee	128	Hilltoppers		1957	1968	WIAA (Midwest Classic)
St. Mary's Springs	Fond du Lac	Milwaukee	263	Ledgers		1957	1968	WIAA (Wisconsin Flyway)
Dominican	Whitefish Bay	Milwaukee	324	Knights		1958	1968	WIAA (Metro Classic)
St. Joseph	Kenosha	Milwaukee	229	Lancers		1958	1968	WIAA (Metro Classic)
Xavier	Appleton	Green Bay	468	Hawks		1960	1968	WIAA (Bay)
Francis Jordan	Milwaukee	Milwaukee	N/A	Cardinals		1961	1968	Closed in 1969
Lourdes Academy	Oshkosh	Green Bay	178	Knights		1961	1968	WIAA (Trailways)
Holy Cross Seminary	La Crosse	La Crosse	N/A	Comets		1964	1968	Closed in 1971
de Sales Prep	St. Francis	Milwaukee	N/A	Saints		1965	1968	Closed in 1979
Roncalli	Manitowoc	Green Bay	223	Jets		1965	1968	WIAA (Eastern Wisconsin)
Holy Name Seminary	Madison	Madison	N/A	Hilanders		1966	1968	Closed in 1995
Sacred Heart Seminary	Oneida	Green Bay	N/A	Scouts		1966	1968	Closed in 1976
Salvatorian Seminary	St. Nazianz	Green Bay	N/A	Royals		1966	1968	Closed (succeeded by JFK Prep)
St. Lawrence Seminary	Mount Calvary	Milwaukee	256	Hilltoppers		1966	1968	WIAA (Independent)
Pio Nono	St. Francis	Milwaukee	N/A	Spartans		1967	1968	Closed in 1972 (merged into Thomas More)

== Former WCIAA-affiliated conferences ==
Alignments are listed for WCIAA membership dates only; see links for full conference histories.

=== Central Wisconsin Catholic Conference ===
School	Location	Tenure
Assumption High School	Wisconsin Rapids	1957-1968
Campion Jesuit High School	Prairie du Chien	1957-1968
Columbus Catholic High School	Marshfield	1957-1968
Newman Catholic High School	Wausau	1957-1968
Pacelli High School	Stevens Point	1957-1968
McDonell Central Catholic High School	Chippewa Falls	1961-1968
Regis High School	Eau Claire	1963-1968
Aquinas High School	La Crosse	1964-1968

=== Fox Valley Catholic Conference ===
School	Location	Tenure
Abbot Pennings High School	De Pere	1957-1968
Marinette Central Catholic High School	Marinette	1957-1968
Our Lady of Premontre High School	Green Bay	1957-1968
St. John High School	Little Chute	1957-1968
St. Mary Catholic High School	Neenah	1957-1968
St. Mary's Springs Academy	Fond du Lac	1957-1968
Lourdes Academy	Oshkosh	1961-1968
Xavier High School	Appleton	1961-1968

=== Milwaukee Catholic Conference ===
School	Location	Tenure
Catholic Memorial High School	Waukesha	1957-1968
Don Bosco High School	Milwaukee	1957-1968
Marquette University High School	Milwaukee	1957-1968
Messmer High School	Milwaukee	1957-1968
Notre Dame High School	Milwaukee	1957-1968
Pius XI High School	Milwaukee	1957-1968
St. Bonaventure High School	Sturtevant	1957-1968
St. Catherine's High School	Racine	1957-1968
St. John's Cathedral High School	Milwaukee	1957-1968
Dominican High School	Whitefish Bay	1958-1968
St. Joseph High School	Kenosha	1958-1968
St. Benedict the Moor High School	Milwaukee	1959-1964
Francis Jordan High School	Milwaukee	1961-1968

=== WCIAA members in non-WCIAA conferences ===
School	Location	Tenure	Conference
Beloit Catholic High School	Beloit	1957-1961	SWAPS Conference
St. Mary's High School	Burlington	1957-1961	SWAPS Conference
McDonell Central Catholic High School	Chippewa Falls	1960-1961	Bi-State Conference
Sacred Heart High School	Lima	1960-1966	Bi-State Conference
St. Mary's High School	Burlington	1961-1963	Southeastern Wisconsin Conference
Madonna High School	Mauston	1962-1966	Central-C Conference
St. Gregory High School	St. Nazianz	1963-1968	Kettle Moraine Conference
St. Mary's High School	Burlington	1963-1968	Southeastern Badger Conference
Beloit Catholic High School	Beloit	1964-1968	SHARK Conference (IHSA)
Cathedral High School	Superior	1965-1968	Michigan-Wisconsin Conference
de Sales Preparatory Academy	St. Francis	1965-1968	Wisconsin Seminary League
Holy Name Seminary	Madison	1966-1968	Wisconsin Seminary League
Sacred Heart Seminary	Oneida	1966-1968	Wisconsin Seminary League
Salvatorian Seminary	St. Nazianz	1966-1968	Wisconsin Seminary League
St. Lawrence Seminary	Mount Calvary	1966-1968	Wisconsin Seminary League
Roncalli High School	Manitowoc	1967-1968	Kettle Moraine Conference

== List of state champions ==
Baseball
Year	Champion
1957	Notre Dame
1958	Edgewood
1959	Marquette University
1960	Edgewood
1961	Edgewood
1962	Marquette University
1963	Pius XI
1964	Pius XI
1965	St. Joseph
1966	Edgewood
1967	Edgewood
1968	St. Catherine's

Basketball (pre-WCIAA)
Year	Champion
1928	Marquette University
1929	Marquette University
1930	Campion Jesuit
1931	Campion Jesuit
1932	Campion Jesuit
1933	St. John's Cathedral
1934	None
1935	None
1936	St. Norbert
1937	St. Norbert
1938	Notre Dame
1939	St. Norbert
1940	St. Mary Catholic
1941	Aquinas
1942	Edgewood
1943	Edgewood
1944	Aquinas
1945	Edgewood
1946	Aquinas
1947	Regis
1948	Regis
1949	Aquinas
1950	Aquinas
1951	St. Norbert
1952	Regis
1953	St. Mary Catholic
1954	Marquette University
1955	St. Mary Catholic
1956	St. Norbert

Basketball
Year	Champion
1957	St. Norbert
1958	St. Catherine's
1959	St. Catherine's
1960	St. Mary Catholic
1961	St. Catherine's
1962	Edgewood
1963	Xavier
1964	Marinette Central Catholic
1965	Marquette University
1966	Messmer
1967	Marquette University
1968	Messmer

Cross Country
Year	Champion
1967	Pius XI

Golf
Year	Champion
1957	Aquinas
1958	Marquette University
1959	St. Mary's Springs
1960	St. Catherine's
1961	St. Catherine's
1962	Don Bosco
1963	Marquette University
1964	Marquette University
1965	Marquette University
1966	Marquette University
1967	St. Joseph
1968	Pius XI

Tennis
Year	Champion
1960	Catholic Memorial
1961	Catholic Memorial
1962	Catholic Memorial
1963	Catholic Memorial, Xavier (tie)
1964	Catholic Memorial
1965	Marquette University
1966	Marquette University
1967	Beloit Catholic, Marquette University (tie)
1968	Edgewood

Track & Field
Year	Champion	
1957	Marquette University	
1958	Marquette University	
1959	Pius XI	
1960	Pius XI	
1961	Pius XI	
1962	Marquette University	
1963	Marquette University	
1964	Aquinas	
Year	Class A	Class B
1965	Marquette University	Assumption
1966	Messmer	Columbus Catholic
1967	Pius XI	Assumption
1968	Messmer	Assumption

Wrestling
Year	Champion
1957	St. Catherine's
1958	Don Bosco
1959	Catholic Memorial
1960	Catholic Memorial
1961	St. Joseph
1962	St. Joseph
1963	St. Joseph
1964	St. Joseph
1965	St. Joseph
1966	St. Joseph
1967	Aquinas
1968	Aquinas
