= Donna DeEtte Elbert =

American female mathematician

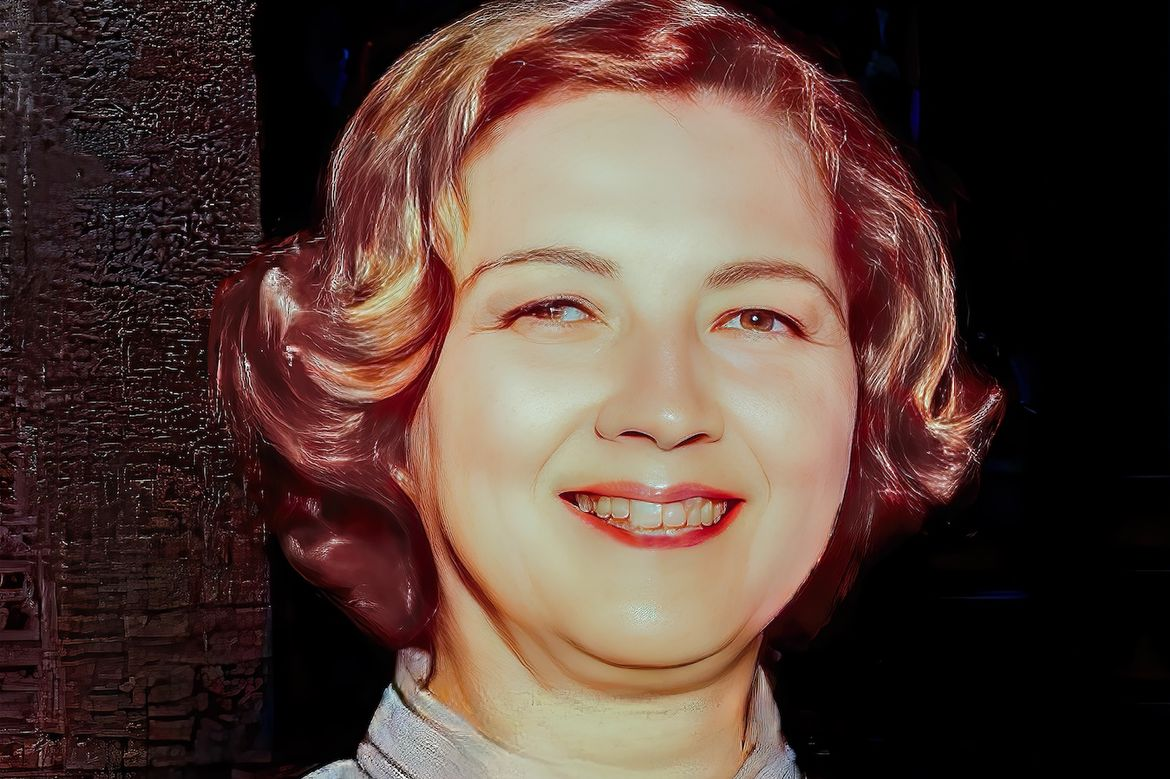
- Born: January 27, 1928; Williams Bay, Wisconsin, U.S.
- Died: January 15, 2019 (aged 90); Wisconsin

Donna DeEtte Elbert (27 January 1928 – 15 January 2019) was an American mathematician and scientist.

== Early life and education ==
Born 27 January 1928 in Williams Bay, Wisconsin to William Lawrence Elbert and Sue Melicent Hatch, Donna DeEtte Elbert was the second of three siblings. She attended Williams Bay Elementary School and Williams Bay High School, graduating in 1945.

When Elbert accepted her position to work for astrophysicist Subrahmanyan Chandrasekhar in 1948, she did not have any official education in advanced mathematics. It was only after Elbert's employer Chandrasekhar encouraged her to enroll in advanced mathematics courses at the University of Wisconsin–Madison did she formally obtain education in advanced mathematics such as calculus. Despite her now-formal start in college mathematics, she pursued and graduated with a Bachelors of Fine Arts degree from School of the Art Institute of Chicago in 1974. She also received six weeks of education from Parsons School of Design in New York City during the summer of 1956, during which Chandrasekhar worked at Los Alamos.

== Science career ==
At 20 years of age and without college education, Elbert began working as a human "computer" for Subrahmanyan Chandrasekhar at the Yerkes Observatory in Wisconsin in the autumn of 1948. She later also worked both at Yerkes and the University of Chicago. Although she originally intended to work under Chandrasekhar only long enough so that she could afford attending design college, she continued to work for the astrophysicist for over the next thirty years.

Elbert's first major set of contributions to Chandrasekhar's research, which resulted in her explicit name recognition, was computing solutions to sophisticated differential equations to numerically and algebraically solve for variables in relation to Heisenberg's theory of turbulence. Although she did not gain co-authorship for her mathematical work, Chandrasekhar did give her his thanks in the paper's closing remarks: "In conclusion, I wish to record my indebtedness to Miss Donna Elbert for valuable assistance with the various numerical integrations involved in the preparation of this paper".

After continuing to provide Chandrasekhar with mathematical assistance, he encouraged Elbert, who had no prior official education in advanced mathematics, to study advanced mathematics courses at the University of Wisconsin, Madison.

Elbert achieved co-authorship of 18 papers with Chandrasekhar with her work in analyzing turbulence, magnetohydrodynamics, polarization of the sunlit sky, rotating flows, convection, and other topics as she progressed into a more central role in Chardrasekhar's group's research, promoting herself beyond her original role as a computer. Despite this step-up, Elbert still conducted much of Chandrasekhar's numerical work, often producing solutions that were more further simplified compared to Chandrasekhar's. Elbert also authored her own paper, “Bessel and Related Functions Which Occur in Hydromagnetics," published in The Astrophysical Journal in 1957.

Elbert continued to conduct research with Chandrasekhar until 1979.

== Elbert range ==
During Elbert's research with Chandrasekhar on the book later published under the title Hydrodynamic and Hydromagnetic Stability, Elbert noted a range of values in the hydrodynamic and hydromagnetic marginal stability curves which result in local minima surrounded by extreme changes. Despite Elbert's key insight and extensive work on the book, she was not given co-authorship of the work by Chandrasekhar. Instead, Chandrasekhar thanked Elbert in only a single footnote.

Researcher and scholar Susanne Horn of the Coventry University (UK) and postdoctoral associate Jonathan Aurnou of UCLA (USA) now build on Elbert's key insight about a range of body's specific values on hydrodynamic and hydromagnetic marginal stability curves that lead to unusually strong magnetic fields in their publication The Elbert Range of magnetostrophic convection I. Linear Theory. This specific range of values is now known as the Elbert range.

Horn and Arnou reveal that studying the Elbert Range can yield crucial insight into research on objects such as stars and exoplanets. In the case of exoplanets, objects that fall within the Elbert Range, such as earth, have substantially strong magnetic fields that can deflect harmful radiation, increasing the probability that life similar to that we know exists on that exoplanet.

=== Very Briefly: The Elbert Range ===
Bodies that have fluid and conductive interiors, such as Earth with its molten liquid metallic core, can create their own magnetic fields due to the movement of charge within their conductive cores. The fluid's motion depends largely on two factors: 1) the combination of the body's rotational velocity and size, which affects the Coriolis Force on the fluids, and 2) convection of the fluid caused by differences in temperature in different sections of the fluid. For bodies that lie in the Elbert Range, the strength of the motion of the conductive fluid caused by the Coriolis Effect and convection are approximately equal, causing the fluid to flow more uniformly in an orderly manner. This uniformity of flow allows for the generation of strong magnetic fields around the body. On the other hand, most bodies do not lie in the Elbert Range, and their conductive cores (if they have one) do not flow in an orderly fashion. Disparate contributions of fluid flow caused by the Coriolis Effect and convection cause disruptive flow patterns, resulting in only weak magnetic fields. Horn and Arnou expanded on Elbert's work regarding the Elbert Range with modern computational and analytical tools.

== Personal life ==
Despite working long hours for Chandrasekhar, Elbert and her family still remained in close touch with her community in Williams Bay. She served as the treasurer of Walworth County Historical Society for 15 years, and her father owned a local barbershop from 1929 to 1970. She picked up many hobbies, including art, piano, and genealogy, because of which she joined the Mayflower Society and Daughters of the Revolution. At one point she took piano lessons with Chandrasekhar, though he quit after their teacher progressed through the basics too fast for Chandrasekhar's liking. On vacations, Elbert would read books recommended to her by her boss and discuss them with him upon her return.

Elbert died on 15 January 2019 at the age of 90 at Aurora Lakeland Medical Center in Wisconsin due to a brief illness.
