= Wisconsin Seminary League =

Wisconsin high school athletic conference (1963-1969)

The Wisconsin Seminary League was a statewide interscholastic athletic organization consisting of Catholic seminaries in Wisconsin. It was operational from 1963 to 1969.

== History ==
Location of Original Wisconsin Seminary League Members

The Wisconsin Seminary League, also known by its official title of the Wisconsin Catholic Seminary Conference, was founded in 1963 by nine Catholic seminaries in the state of Wisconsin: Blessed Sacrament in Waupaca, Divine Word in East Troy, Mount St. Paul in Waukesha, Queen of Apostles in Madison, Sacred Heart in Oneida, Salvatorian in St. Nazianz, St. Francis de Sales in St. Francis, St. Joseph in Edgerton and St. Lawrence in Mount Calvary. The age range for players was slightly different than those in traditional high schools; instead of grades 9-12, teams consisted of boys in grades 10-13. Because of this, it was not associated with the Wisconsin Catholic Interscholastic Athletic Association, but WCIAA members were common non-conference athletic opponents. The conference was subdivided into divisions based on geography for their first season of basketball competition:

Northern Division	Southern Division
Blessed Sacrament	Divine Word
Sacred Heart	Mount St. Paul
Salvatorian	Queen of Apostles
St. Lawrence	St. Francis de Sales
	St. Joseph

In 1965, the Pallotine Fathers ended Queen of Apostles' seminary program for a more traditional co-educational high school enrollment model, and two seminaries joined the conference as replacements: Holy Name in Madison and St. Columban in Oconomowoc. Both schools joined the conference's Southern Division:

Northern Division	Southern Division
Blessed Sacrament	Divine Word
Sacred Heart	Holy Name
Salvatorian	Mount St. Paul
St. Lawrence	St. Columban
	St. Francis de Sales
	St. Joseph

In 1966, three schools (Mount St. Paul, St. Columban and St. Francis de Sales) left the Wisconsin Seminary League and the organization consolidated down to one division with seven schools. The conference's membership roster decreased to six in 1968, as Salvatorian Seminary closed and a new Catholic high school (John F. Kennedy Prep) opened on its former campus in St. Nazianz. The Wisconsin Seminary League was disbanded in 1969, by which time three of the remaining members (Holy Name, Sacred Heart, and St. Lawrence) had joined the WCIAA and remained members during that organization's transition into the Wisconsin Independent Schools Athletic Association. Former Seminary League members Divine Word and St. Joseph joined WISAA in 1970, and Blessed Sacrament closed its doors in 1971.

== Conference membership history ==
Seminary	Location	Affiliation/Order	Mascot	Colors	Joined	Left	Conference Joined	Current Conference
Blessed Sacrament	Waupaca, WI	Blessed Sacrament Fathers	Knights		1963	1969	Independent	Closed in 1971
Divine Word	East Troy, WI	Verbite	Crusaders		1963	1969	Independent	Closed in 1991
Mount St. Paul	Waukesha, WI	Salvatorian	Moors		1963	1966	Independent	Closed
Queen of Apostles	Madison, WI	Pallotine	Queensmen		1963	1965	Closed (replaced by co-ed high school)	
Sacred Heart	Oneida, WI	Diocese of Green Bay	Scouts		1963	1969	Independent	Closed in 1976
Salvatorian	St. Nazianz, WI	Salvatorian	Royals		1963	1968	Closed (replaced by JFK Prep)	
St. Francis de Sales	St. Francis, WI	Archdiocese of Milwaukee	Saints		1963	1966	Independent	Closed in 1979
St. Joseph	Edgerton, WI	Redemptorists	Johawks		1963	1969	Independent	Closed in 1980
St. Lawrence	Mount Calvary, WI	Franciscan	Hilltoppers		1963	1969	Fox Valley Tri-County	Wisconsin Flyway (2025)
Holy Name	Madison, WI	Diocese of Madison	Hilanders		1965	1969	Independent	Closed in 1995
St. Columban	Oconomowoc, WI	Missionary Society of St. Columban	Ramblers		1965	1966	Independent	Closed in 1971

== Membership timeline ==
Northern Division Southern Division
