= Calvary Baptist School (Wisconsin) =

Pre-K–12th grade school in Menomonee Falls, Wisconsin, US

Coordinates: 43°10′04.0″N 88°08′52.2″W

- Menomonee Falls, Wisconsin; USA

Information
- Type: Pre-Kindergarten –-12th grade
- Religious affiliations: Baptist, Fundamentalist Protestant
- Established: 1975
- Administrator: Steven Lafferty
- Faculty: 25
- Enrollment: 250+
- Campus: 17 acres (69,000 m^{2})
- Colors: Red and white
- Athletics: 3 sports, compete in the Indian Trails Conference and Wisconsin Association of Christian Schools
- Nickname: Eagles
- Website: Calvary Baptist School website

Calvary Baptist School is a private, Baptist school located in Menomonee Falls, Wisconsin, a suburb of Milwaukee, Wisconsin, United States. Calvary consists of preschool through twelfth grade and is one of the largest Protestant schools in the state. It is a member of the American Association of Christian Schools.

== History and mission ==
Calvary Baptist School was founded in the fall of 1975 as a ministry of Calvary Baptist Church, which desired to provide a quality Christian education to children in the Milwaukee area. Calvary's purpose is to educate students physically, emotionally, intellectually, socially and spiritually.

The school is one of the largest Protestant schools in the Milwaukee area and the largest member of the Wisconsin Association of Christian Schools (WACS). In 2006, construction was completed on a new campus.

== Doctrinal statement ==
Calvary Baptist School adheres to the following: The divine verbal (word by word), plenary inspiration of Scriptures; the inerrancy of Scripture; the complete revelation in creation, the Bible (66 books) and Jesus Christ; God revealed in the Father, Son and Holy Spirit; that man is totally depraved and condemned apart from a personal recognition and turning from sin and trusting Jesus alone for salvation; that a believer is a new creature, therefore, should live a holy, clean and pure life by the power of God; that God’s work is fulfilled by believers as they unite in local, visible, Bible preaching churches; that the ordinances are believer’s baptism (by immersion) and the Lord’s table; that God expects believers to honor Him with their attendance in the local church on the first day of the week; that believers honor civil government; that the believer will go to be with Christ immediately at death and that unsaved go to damnation; and that Jesus Christ could come for the saved at any time.

== Administration ==
The school board has seven to ten members, including at least one deacon appointed by the deacon board, at least five members elected at large, and a treasurer elected at large. The administrator and associate administrator are responsible for the leadership and activities of the school.

== Athletics ==
Sports offered by Calvary Baptist for middle and high school students include boys' soccer, girls' volleyball, and boys' and girls' basketball.

The Eagles compete in the Indian Trails Conference and the Wisconsin Association of Christian Schools (WACS). Calvary's boys' high school basketball program has won numerous conference, tournament, and state championships. Recent victories include five consecutive WACS state championships. The high school soccer program, which began play in 1999, has won several conference titles and three state championships.

Calvary's new campus facility, completed in 2006, contains a full-size gym.
