= Holiday Home Camp =

Coordinates: 42°33′51.8″N 88°33′37.5″W

Founder's Hall at Holiday Home Camp

Holiday Home Camp is an overnight children's camp on Geneva Lake in Williams Bay, Wisconsin. It is a non-profit organization which provides an outdoor experience for low-income youth from the surrounding areas, including Milwaukee, Madison, and Chicago. The program consists of eight day sessions for children ages seven through thirteen. There is also a year-round leadership program, called the ELITE Teens, that is for teens ages thirteen through eighteen. Holiday Home Camp has been accredited by the American Camp Association.

Holiday Home Camp is one of the oldest camps in the United States. It was founded in 1887 by the Lake Geneva Fresh Air Association. The first campers arrived in July 1888.
