= Heritage Christian School (Milwaukee) =

Coordinates: 42°58′51.5″N 88°05′29.1″W

Location
- 3500 South Glen Park Road; New Berlin, Wisconsin 53151; United States

Information
- Type: Private, Christian
- Motto: Training and Inspiring Servant Leaders for Christ
- Religious affiliation: Non-denominational Protestant
- Established: 1973 (as Bethel Christian Academy)
- Superintendent: John Davis
- Grades: Pre K-12
- Colors: Red, White, Blue
- Athletics: Baseball, Soccer, Basketball, Golf, Boys' Volleyball, Girls' Volleyball
- Mascot: Patriot
- Website: http://www.heritagechristianschools.org/

Heritage Christian School is a private, pre-K-12 Christian school located in Milwaukee, Wisconsin. It was established in 1973 by Bethel Baptist Church as Bethel Christian Academy. Originally located in the basement of the church at North 76th Street and West Luscher Avenue, the school has moved twice, first to North 107th Street, then to its current location at South 109th Street. Growth in enrollment allowed the school to add an additional campus for the elementary school in 1989, located on Elm Grove Road in Brookfield, Wisconsin. They are now located at 3500 S Glen Park Rd in New Berlin, Wisconsin.

== Athletics ==
Heritage Christian's sports teams are known as the Patriots, and they have been members of the Midwest Classic Conference since 1989.

=== Athletic conference affiliation history ===
- SWISS Conference (1982-1989)
- Midwest Classic Conference (1989–present)
