= The Prairie School (Wind Point, Wisconsin) =

Private school in Wisconsin, US

Location
- 4050 Lighthouse Dr, Wind Point, WI 53402; Wind Point, Racine County, Wisconsin, Wisconsin 53402; United States; 42.772901°N 87.7746599°W

Information
- Type: Private,
- Motto: "To know, value, support, and challenge every student to be their best self"
- Religious affiliation: Non-denominational
- Established: 1965
- Founder: Imogene Powers Johnson and Willie Hilpert
- School district: Racine Unified School District
- Superintendent: Soren Gajewski
- School code: NCES School ID: A1904844
- CEEB code: College Entrance Examination Board code - 501918
- President: Nat Coffman
- Head of school: Nat Coffman
- Faculty: 100+
- Grades: pre K–12
- Gender: coeducational
- Average class size: Maximum of 16 students
- Student to teacher ratio: 1:7
- Hours in school day: 7 1/2
- Campus size: 49.5 acres
- Campus type: suburban
- Colors: Royal blue and white
- Fight song: Prairie School Song
- Athletics: yes
- Athletics conference: Metro Classic
- Sports: Baseball; Basketball; Cross Country; Golf; Soccer; Swimming; Tennis; Track; Girls’ Volleyball
- Mascot: Hawk
- Nickname: Prairie
- Team name: Knights
- Yearbook: The Prism
- Endowment: 636 students
- Annual tuition: $11,600 – $24,700 (2026)
- Website: www.prairieschool.com
- Last updated: March 21, 2026

The Prairie School is a private pre K–12 school in Wind Point, Wisconsin, in the Racine metropolitan area.

== History ==
The school first opened in 1965. It was co-founded by Imogene "Gene" Powers Johnson (died March 3, 2018), wife of Samuel Curtis Johnson Jr.; and Willie Hilpert, wife of Frank Hilpert.

Initially the school founders intended to convert the 2300 Washington Ave. residence into a school facility and grow it at that site, but they could not overcome complying with building codes and conversion logistics, so a different site was chosen. Taliesin Associates designed the school buildings, with Charles Montooth as the lead designer of the original and subsequent buildings up to 2004. The school founders selected Taliesin's designs because they contrasted to other square/rectangular-based ones of the time; their other proposal from architects in Milwaukee, Wisconsin, had the ordinary design.

Johnson continued to serve as the director and chairperson of the school after its establishment. Michael Burke of The Journal Times described her as "one of the Racine community’s major benefactors". Samuel Curtis Johnson served as the school's Chairman of the Board until 1983, when he was named Founding Chairman Emeritus, a position he held until his death.

By 2004 there had been ten additions to the school facility.

John H. ("Jack") Mitchell was the first Headmaster. Mark Murphy served as the headmaster from 1993 until June 30, 2014. Nathaniel Coffman, previously the headmaster of the York Country Day School, became the new headmaster at that time.

== Campus ==
The magazine Buildings described the campus as being "Frank Lloyd Wright-inspired". Imogene Johnson, one of Prairie's founders, was the wife of the eponymous head of SC Johnson corporation, based in Racine. The Johnson family and company commissioned many Wright buildings, such as their corporate headquarters Johnson Wax Headquarters, the Wingspread conference center very near the school, and others.

The first building became the Middle School, and is a complete circle surrounding a small courtyard. The Lower and Upper School buildings were soon added, which are curved arcs attached to the Middle School by hallways. Other early additions included a small gymnasium, a circular cafeteria, and a teardrop-shaped art department with a second story for offices and small student workspaces with excellent lighting. Most Prairie School buildings are single story, made of brick, and colored red, and emphasize circles. With the exception of the field house, there are hallways connecting them.

In 1969 the H.F. Johnson Fieldhouse opened. There was a $14 million planned 25,000-square-foot (2,300 m^{2}) addition, built circa 2004, added to the fieldhouse's north, with engineering done by Zimmerman Design Group and general contracting being done by Bukacek Construction. The addition includes a two-story atrium connecting it with the original building as well as basketball courts, a multipurpose room used for dance classes, a running track inside the building, and a weight room.

In 2014 the Osiecki Soccer Field was dedicated and is a “certified level two” playing surface by the Federation Internationale de Football Association (FIFA), the only FIFA–2 level high school soccer field in Wisconsin.

In 2020 construction began on the Leipold Johnson Early Childhood Center a 12,500 square foot Early School (3K & 4K PreKindergarten) building which opened in August 2021. Built by Bukacek Construction each classroom has 1,220-square-feet. The Early School wing also has an art room, music room and multi-purpose room that is available to all students.

== Athletics ==
The following sports are offered in the Upper School:

Fall:

- Cross Country (Coed Varsity)
- Golf (Golf – Girls Varsity)
- Golf (Golf – Girls JV)
- Soccer (Boys Varsity)
- Soccer (Boys JV)
- Tennis (Girls Varsity)
- Tennis (Girls JV)
- Volleyball (Girls Varsity)
- Volleyball (Girls JV)
- Volleyball (Girls JV2)
- Swimming & Diving (Girls’ Varsity)

Winter:

- Basketball (Boys Varsity)
- Basketball (Boys JV 1)
- Basketball (Boys JV 2)
- Basketball (Girls Varsity)
- Basketball (Girls JV)
- Swimming & Diving (Boys Varsity)
- Wrestling (Varsity)

Spring:

- Baseball (Varsity)
- Baseball (JV)
- Golf (Golf – Boys Varsity)
- Golf (Golf – Boys JV)
- Soccer (Girls Varsity)
- Soccer (Girls JV)
- Tennis (Boys Varsity)
- Tennis (Boys JV)
- Track (Boys)
- Track (Girls)

=== Athletic conference affiliation history ===
- Indian Trails Conference (1969-1977)
- Classic Conference (1977-1983)
- Midwest Classic Conference (1983-2012)
- Metro Classic Conference (2012–present)
