= Kettle Moraine Lutheran High School =

Coordinates: 43°18′47″N 88°07′29″W

Location
- 3399 Division Rd; Jackson, Wisconsin 53037; United States

Information
- Type: Christian High School
- Motto: Educating for Life and for Eternity
- Established: 1974
- Principal: Jamie Luehring
- Grades: 9–12
- Enrollment: 632 (2024–2025)
- Colors: Green and White
- Mascot: Chargers
- Nickname: KML or Kettle
- Accreditation: WRISA and WELSSA
- Yearbook: Equestrian
- Affiliation: WELS
- Website: kmlhs.org

Kettle Moraine Lutheran High School (KMLHS) is a four-year Lutheran high school in the Town of Jackson, Wisconsin, located approximately 20 miles northwest of Milwaukee. The school is affiliated with the Wisconsin Evangelical Lutheran Synod (WELS).

The high school educates students from a large geographic area including Grafton, Mequon, West Bend, Hartford, and Menomonee Falls. As of the 2025–2026 school year, KMLHS has an enrollment of 632 students. This was the first time the high school saw its student population surpass 600. For the 2017–2018 school year, KMLHS received an Overall Accountability Rating of "Significantly Exceeds Expectations" from the Wisconsin Department of Public Instruction.

== History ==
KMLHS opened in 1974 with an enrollment of 35 students in grades nine and ten. The high school was temporarily located at Christ Lutheran Church in the village of Jackson. In 1976, KMLHS broke ground on its 48-acre campus on Division Road in Jackson. The high school has expanded through additions in 1980, 1993, 2001, and 2012.

Construction is currently underway on a $4.7 million expansion that will include new classrooms and science labs.

== Academics ==
Advanced mathematics classes include statistics, pre-calculus, and AP Calculus, as well as calculus 1, 2, and 3 offered as CAPP dual-credit courses through the University of Wisconsin - Oshkosh. Advanced science classes include anatomy, honors anatomy, physics, chemistry, honors chemistry, and AP Chemistry. Foreign languages offered are German, Spanish, and Latin.

=== Accreditation ===
Kettle Moraine Lutheran High School is accredited by the Wisconsin Religious and Independent Schools Accreditation (WRISA), and by the Wisconsin Evangelical Lutheran Synod School Accreditation (WELSSA).

== Infrastructure ==
=== Performing arts center ===
The school's performing arts center is used for musical performances, community events, and chapel. The construction of the 750-seat Performing Arts Center was the final step in the four-phase facility plan that began in 2001.

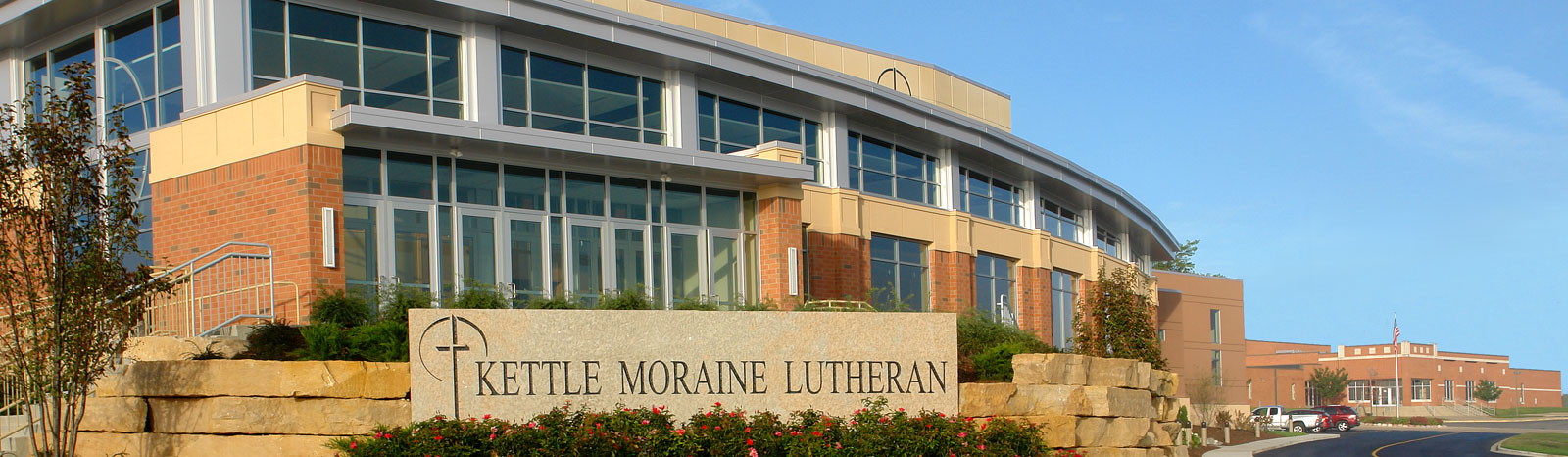
Kettle Moraine Lutheran High School

=== Waste water treatment ===
In 2001, the school built an artificial wetland for waste water management. In March 2003, a grant from Toyota Motor Sales allowed the school to install a windmill to aerate the wetlands, potentially increasing the facility's effectiveness. The experimental facility is the first of its kind among schools of the upper Midwest. The school calls the system "The Green Machine" and uses it for environmental education, allowing the school's Ecology Club to assist in its development and maintenance.

=== Solar energy system ===
In 2009, the school built a solar panel array consisting of 16 panels mounted on four solar trackers to generate electricity that will help power the school's facilities. This system was built in partnership with We Energies, a Power company serving Wisconsin. In 2010, phase 2 of the "Let the Sun Shine...Let the Son Shine" solar project was completed, adding 112 more panels on seven trackers. In 2011, phase 3, a ground mounted solar array was installed on a hill overlooking the school. These solar arrays provide 10–15% of the school's power.

=== Weather station ===
The school maintains a weather station as part of the SMART Weathernet on WITI Fox 6 TV in Milwaukee.

== Extracurricular activities ==
KMLHS has clubs for chess, ecology, the fine arts, German, yearbook, math competitions, and sound and lighting work. Those interested in drama can participate in children's theater, forensics, and musicals. The school cultivates student leadership through student council, Cross Trainers, National Honor Society, Taste of Ministry programs and Musical Clubs.

=== Videography club ===
The Videography club is responsible for recording athletic and music events as well as live streaming them.

=== Music ===
The KML choirs consist of Traveling Choir (open to grades 10–12 through auditions), Kantorei Choir (grade 9), Concert Choir (tryout choir), and The Echoes (Show Choir).

The bands of KML consist of the Concert Band (lower band) and The Wind Symphony (tryout band). Other extracurricular bands include Jazz Band, Jazz Combo, Pep Band, and Percussion Ensemble. The Percussion Ensemble has played in venues such as the Wisconsin state capitol rotunda in Madison. Private instrumental and vocal lessons are also available. Students have also formed their own student-led groups such as brass ensembles and flute choirs.

=== Athletics ===
Kettle Moraine Lutheran High School offers basketball, cross-country, cheerleading, chess, soccer, fast-pitch softball, track, and volleyball for girls; and baseball, basketball, chess, cross country, football, golf, soccer, wrestling, and track for boys.

==== Football ====
The football program was started in 2001. In 2007 the Chargers entered the playoffs for the first time, progressing to the championship game, which they lost to West Salem High School.

==== Basketball ====
The girls' basketball team won consecutive Wisconsin Independent Schools Athletic Association (WISAA) Class B girls championships in 1990 and 1991. The girls' basketball team also won the WIAA Division 3 championship in 2014

==== Volleyball ====
The girls' volleyball team won the 1988 Wisconsin independent schools Class B championship, taking the round robin competition with a 4–2 record to end Marinette Catholic Central's streak of four consecutive championships. The girls' volleyball team won consecutive Wisconsin Interscholastic Athletic Association state championships in 2002, 2003, 2004, and 2007. That made the team one of only five in the state to have won consecutive championships in three years. The girls' volleyball team also won the 2012 WIAA Division 2 State Championship.

==== Cheer team ====
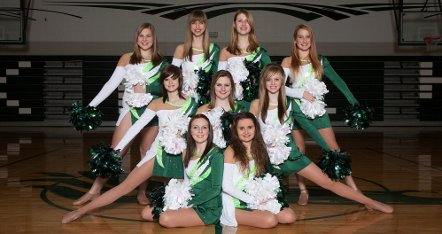

The KMLHS cheer program is one of the most successful programs in Wisconsin. The varsity cheer team won the program's 12th state championship at the WACPC (Wisconsin Association of Cheer/Pom Coaches) State Championships in March 2019. The KML Cheer Team was named 2019 State Champions in the All-Girl Large division. The team was also the fourth highest overall scoring team, regardless of division (school size or team size).

==== Girls' soccer ====
The girls' soccer won WIAA Division 3 state championships in 2009 and 2011.

==== Chess team ====
The chess team plays at a state Division 1 level. Individual members have taken a variety of high-placing awards at a state level, including first place reserve and first place reserve unrated at the Wisconsin Junior Open. The chess team has played competitive in a variety of local leagues, including the Scenic Moraine Chess Association
