= Faith Christian School (Williams Bay, Wisconsin) =

Location
- W5525 Highway 67; Williams Bay, Wisconsin 53191
- Coordinates: 42°34′24.1″N 88°34′18.4″W

Information
- Head of school: Drew Popejoy
- Teaching staff: 18.3 (on an FTE basis)
- Grades: PK-12
- Enrollment: 194 Inc 12 PK students (2022-23)
- Student to teacher ratio: 8.6
- Color: Carolina Blue/Navy
- Athletics conference: Lake City Conference
- Nickname: Eagles
- Website: www.faithchristianschool.org

Faith Christian School is a K-12 private, non-denominational Protestant school in Williams Bay, Wisconsin, United States.

The school was founded in 1981 and educated several hundred students in a church basement leased from Calvary Community Church in Williams Bay. In 1994 the school purchased property for their own school facilities which were completed in 2002.
