= Holy Name Seminary (Madison, Wisconsin) =

- U.S. National Register of Historic Places
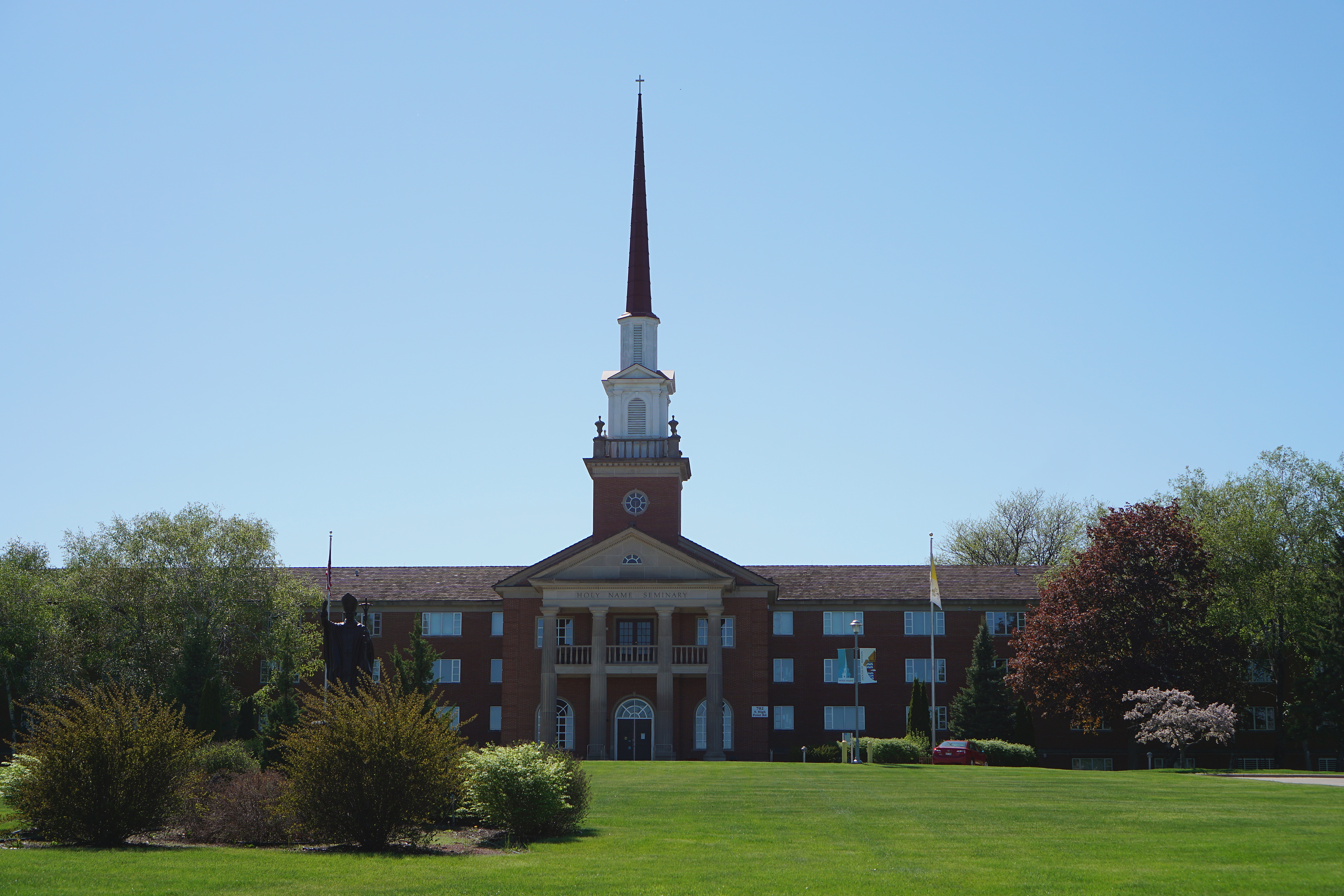
- Holy Name Seminary
- Location: 702 S. High Point Rd. Madison, Wisconsin
- Coordinates: 43.051°N 89.522°W
- Built: 1964
- Architect: Krueger, Kraft & Associates
- Architectural style: Colonial Revival
- NRHP reference No.: 15000424
- Added to NRHP: July 14, 2015

Holy Name Seminary is a former Catholic high school seminary begun in the 1960s on the west side of Madison, Wisconsin. In 2015 the seminary building and some associated structures were added to the National Register of Historic Places as an excellent example of the Neo-Colonial Revival architecture style.

The building currently houses offices for the Diocese of Madison as well as an apartment community named Holy Name Heights.

== History ==
In the years before 1946 the Catholic Church organized itself in Wisconsin into four dioceses. In that year, to accommodate growing population, it split a fifth diocese out of the Milwaukee and La Crosse dioceses: the Diocese of Madison. The number of young men considering the priesthood also greatly increased and in 1962 Bishop William P. O'Connor announced that the Madison diocese would start a new seminary. Fund-raising commenced, and by 1964 $4 million was raised.

The diocese's building commission hired Krueger, Kraft and Associates of Madison to design the main building, pictured, and construction began in 1963. It stands 3-stories, clad in red brick, with a tall central spire. The style is Neo-Colonial Revival, mixing modern elements like the multi-pane metal casement windows and the modern interior with classical elements from Colonial Revival style: the symmetry, the front portico with two-story fluted columns supporting a pedimented gable, the brick quoins at the corners. The steeple rises above the entrance, with a square brick tower leading to a wooden belfry, then an octagonal lantern and an octagonal spire topped with a cross. The main building has a B-shaped footprint, with enclosed courtyards in the lobes of the B. Inside, the central section contained common areas - the chapel, dining, gym, pool and library. The east side originally contained the high school facilities and the west side the college facilities. The building had 800 rooms!

A brick convent building for the Sisters of Charity was built south of the main building at the same time - 1.5 stories on a raised basement, clad in red brick with corner quoins and half-round windows that match the style of the main building. A garage, concession building and athletic fields were also built at the same time, and all are considered contributing to the NRHP nomination.

The NRHP nomination observes, "Although the Colonial Revival style of architecture had historically been associated more with Protestant churches than with the Catholic Church, in the years following World War II the Catholic Church in the United States seemed eager to establish an American identity. Gothic Revival churches, with stone exteriors and stained glass windows, were also increasingly expensive to construct. Thus, nationally in the post-war period, many Catholic parishes embraced the Colonial Revival for their new building campaigns."

The first students arrived in September 1964. The school had space for 264 high school students, 122 college students, and 23 faculty. Holy Name was a minor seminary, which meant that a young man considering the priesthood could attend high school in a boarding facility. The high school at Holy Name was also open to boys headed for college and not the priesthood, as long as they abided by the rules. After four years of high school, the seminarian could continue at Holy Name for two years of junior college. At the end of that, if he was approved and chose to continue toward priesthood, he could continue at a major seminary, where he would study philosophy for two years and then continue to four years of divinity school.

Enrollment dipped in the 1970s and the college classes were dropped in 1975. In 1995 Bishop Bullock closed the high school, citing a lack of priests to run it.

The complex was converted into a pastoral center in 1998 and became known as the Bishop O'Connor Catholic Pastoral Center and has since then housed a number of Catholic organizations, including Catholic Charities and Relevant Radio. In 2015, it underwent a $23 million renovation, with a portion of the building being converted into a residential community of 53 apartments named Holy Name Heights.

The seminary's chapel had never had an organ until after 2017, when a 1,187-pipe Aeolian-Skinner pipe organ was restored and installed in an 18-month project.
