= Williams Bay, Wisconsin =

- Village
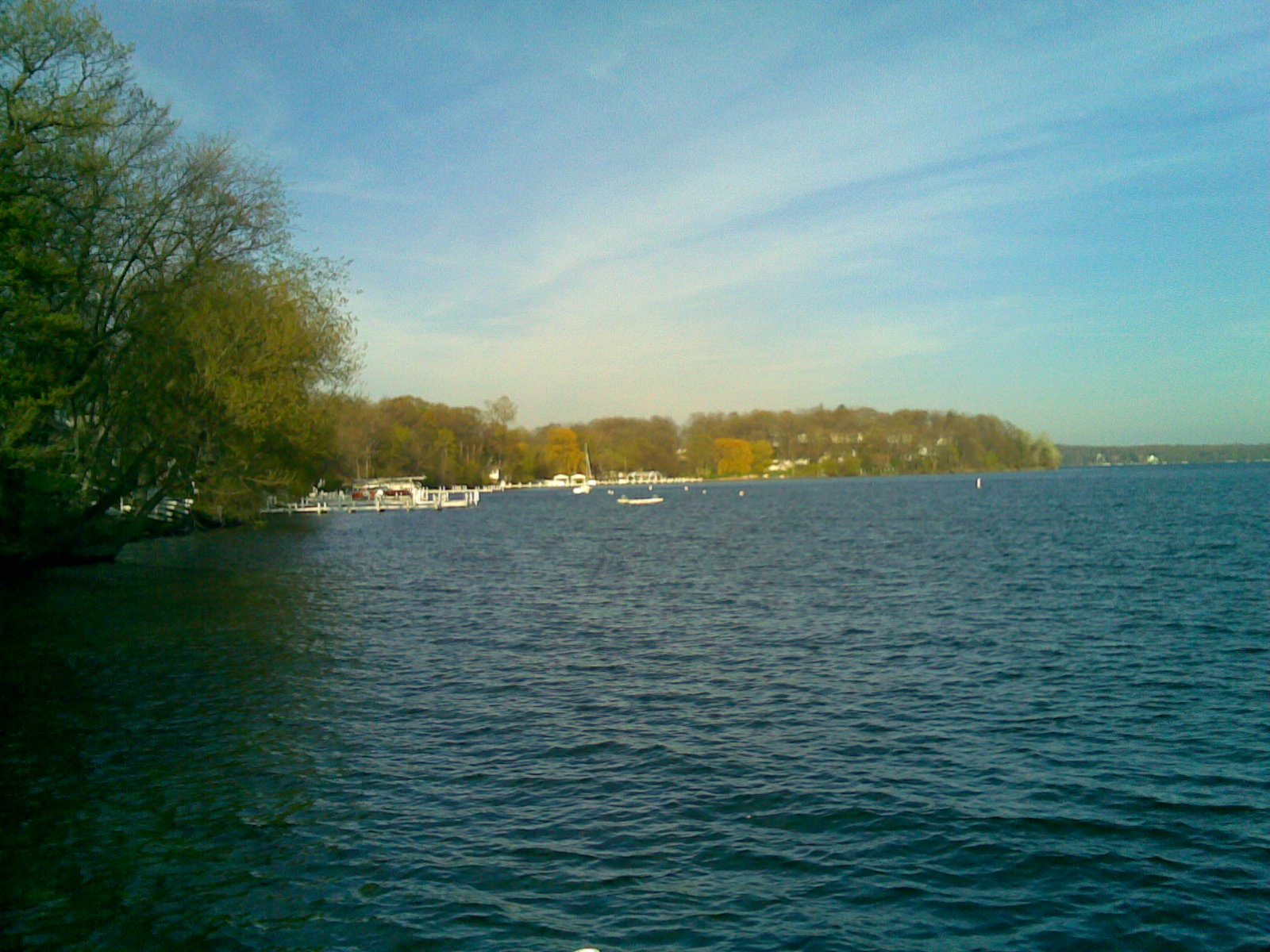
- Skyline over Geneva Lake

- Location of Williams Bay in Walworth County, Wisconsin.
- Coordinates: 42°34′41″N 88°32′27″W
- Country: United States
- State: Wisconsin
- County: Walworth

Area
  - Total: 2.78 sq mi (7.20 km^{2})
  - Land: 2.78 sq mi (7.20 km^{2})
  - Water: 0 sq mi (0.00 km^{2})
- Elevation: 879 ft (268 m)

Population (2020)
  - Total: 2,953
  - Density: 949.4/sq mi (366.55/km^{2})
- Time zone: UTC-6 (Central (CST))
  - Summer (DST): UTC-5 (CDT)
- ZIP Code: 53191
- Area code: 262
- FIPS code: 55-87200
- GNIS feature ID: 1576761
- Website: Official website

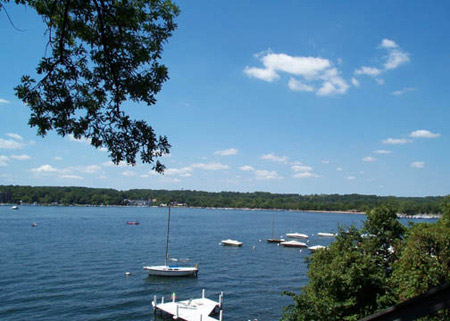
View of Williams Bay from Cedar Point Park

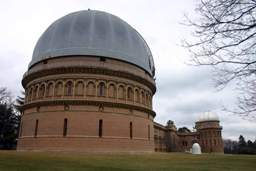
Yerkes Observatory

Williams Bay is a village in Walworth County, Wisconsin, United States. It is one of three municipalities on Geneva Lake. The population was 2,953 at the 2020 census. On June 22, 2024 the town was hit by an EF-1 tornado, there were no injuries or fatalities, but the storm caused some areas of considerable damage.

== History ==
The village was named for Captain Israel Williams of Massachusetts, who, with several of his sons, settled in the area in 1837. Much of the surrounding area was settled in the early 19th century by surveyors plotting roadways from the East.

Williams Bay became a vacation spot for wealthy Chicagoans displaced by the Great Chicago Fire of 1871. The village continues to attract vacationers from Chicago, Milwaukee and elsewhere.

In 1873, mail jumping was established on Geneva Lake as a means to provide postal service via boat to lakeside homes. The tradition is ongoing. Each year between June 15 and September 15, jumpers deliver mail to piers along the lake on behalf of the US Postal Service.

In 1886, a training camp was established by leaders of the YMCA at Williams Bay. The camp's programs later evolved into George Williams College, an independent institution of higher education based in the Hyde Park neighborhood of Chicago and later in Downers Grove, Illinois. The Williams Bay site continued to be used as a summer training camp. The college was later absorbed by Aurora University.

The village is internationally recognized as the home of the Yerkes Observatory which was established by the University of Chicago in 1897. The building was designed by Henry Ives Cobb, while the grounds were designed by John Charles Olmsted. The observatory's Greco-Roman façade has intricate stonework and carvings. The observatory houses the world's largest refracting (lens) telescope, the great 40-inch, which saw first light in May 1897. The Observatory's first Director was George Ellery Hale, who went on to establish Mount Wilson Observatory in Southern California. The observatory has been an important center of astronomical research. The Astrophysical Journal was previously published at the observatory and the facility was the site of the first meeting of the American Astronomical Society in 1899. Albert Einstein visited the observatory during his first trip to the United States in 1921. The facility is operated by the Yerkes Future Foundation.

The Williams Bay Air Force Station served as a general surveillance radar station from 1950 to 1960. A historical marker on the site commemorates the 755th Radar Squadron.

In October 1965, Dr. Martin Luther King Jr. led a three-day retreat of fellow activists and supporters at Conference Point Center. The purpose of the retreat was to develop a strategy to protest racial segregation in Chicago. The resulting plan became known as the Chicago Freedom Movement.

== Geography ==
Williams Bay is located at 42°34′27″N 88°32′37″W (42.574208, -88.543690).

According to the United States Census Bureau, the village has a total area of 2.80 square miles (7.25 km^{2}), all land.

== Demographics ==
Historical population
Census	Pop.	Note	%±
1920	436		—
1930	630		44.5%
1940	717		13.8%
1950	1,118		55.9%
1960	1,347		20.5%
1970	1,554		15.4%
1980	1,763		13.4%
1990	2,108		19.6%
2000	2,415		14.6%
2010	2,564		6.2%
2020	2,953		15.2%
U.S. Decennial Census

=== 2010 census ===
As of the census of 2010, there were 2,564 people, 1,061 households, and 706 families living in the village. The population density was 915.7 inhabitants per square mile (353.6/km^{2}). There were 1,985 housing units at an average density of 708.9 per square mile (273.7/km^{2}). The racial makeup of the village was 94.3% White, 0.6% African American, 0.3% Native American, 0.8% Asian, 0.1% Pacific Islander, 3.0% from other races, and 0.9% from two or more races. Hispanic or Latino of any race were 6.5% of the population.

There were 1,061 households, of which 29.2% had children under the age of 18 living with them, 53.9% were married couples living together, 8.9% had a female householder with no husband present, 3.8% had a male householder with no wife present, and 33.5% were non-families. 28.3% of all households were made up of individuals, and 9.8% had someone living alone who was 65 years of age or older. The average household size was 2.35 and the average family size was 2.87.

The median age in the village was 43.5 years. 22.8% of residents were under the age of 18; 6.3% were between the ages of 18 and 24; 22.9% were from 25 to 44; 30.1% were from 45 to 64; and 17.9% were 65 years of age or older. The gender makeup of the village was 48.2% male and 51.8% female.

=== 2000 census ===
As of the census of 2000, there were 2,415 people, 993 households, and 639 families living in the village. The population density was 912.6 people per square mile (351.9/km^{2}). There were 1,772 housing units at an average density of 669.6 per square mile (258.2/km^{2}). The racial makeup of the village was 98.18% White, 0.50% African American, 0.08% Native American, 0.33% Asian, 0.04% Pacific Islander, 0.70% from other races, and 0.17% from two or more races. Hispanic or Latino of any race were 3.73% of the population.

There were 993 households, out of which 29.6% had children under the age of 18 living with them, 54.1% were married couples living together, 6.9% had a female householder with no husband present, and 35.6% were non-families. 30.4% of all households were made up of individuals, and 12.2% had someone living alone who was 65 years of age or older. The average household size was 2.35 and the average family size was 2.96.

In the village, the population was spread out, with 24.4% under the age of 18, 5.0% from 18 to 24, 26.7% from 25 to 44, 24.6% from 45 to 64, and 19.3% who were 65 years of age or older. The median age was 41 years. For every 100 females, there were 91.8 males. For every 100 females age 18 and over, there were 88.3 males.

The median income for a household in the village was $50,450, and the median income for a family was $60,573. Males had a median income of $45,750 versus $24,875 for females. The per capita income for the village was $26,231. About 5.3% of families and 7.2% of the population were below the poverty line, including 10.4% of those under age 18 and 7.8% of those age 65 or over.

== Points of interest ==
Williams Bay is home to Yerkes Observatory, which was owned by the Department of Astronomy and Astrophysics at the University of Chicago until May 2020. The observatory is now owned by Yerkes Future Foundation. Yerkes new staff began tours and programs on May 27, 2022, after two years of thorough restoration and preservation. Dennis Kois is the executive director. Amanda Bauer is the deputy director who runs the science and education efforts. Dr. Bauer is the first astronomer to be hired by Yerkes Observatory under its nonprofit foundation leadership.

The Belfry Theatre, Wisconsin's first summer stock theater, was an active seasonal repertory company from the 1930s through the 1970s. Its buildings still stand on the southwest corner of Highways 50 and 67. Today it is the home of the Belfry Music Theatre. Harrison Ford's first professional acting job was in summer stock at the Belfry in 1964 after dropping out of Ripon College and before he moved to California. Gary Burghoff, Del Close, and Paul Newman also performed as part of the Belfry Players.

== Recreation ==
Approximately 4 miles of the Geneva Lake Shore Path are located in the village. The lakefront area includes the 231-acre Kishwauketoe Nature Conservancy and Edgewater and East Parks, which include a beach and a public boat launching facility. The village also maintains Baywood Heights Park, Frost Park, Grandview Hill, Prairie View Park, Theatre Road Athletic Fields, and Lions Park, which includes Lions Field House, Rex Dog Park and a community garden. Other properties include the Helen Rohner Children's Fishing Park and recreation facilities at George Williams College.

The village is home to a number of summer camps and retreat centers, including Conference Point Center, Holiday Home Camp, Norman B. Barr Camp, and Wesley Woods.

== Education ==
The Williams Bay School District serves the village, in addition to portions of the towns of Delavan, Geneva, Linn, and Walworth. Public schools include Williams Bay Elementary, Williams Bay Middle, and Williams Bay High School. One private school, Faith Christian School, serves students in grades K-12.

George Williams College of Aurora University was located along the lake. The GWC campus consisted of 137 acres and hosted a conference center and the Music by the Lake summer concert series. Aurora University ceased operations at this campus in 2023.

== Public safety ==
The Williams Bay Police Department consists of eight sworn police officers. Geneva Lake is patrolled by the Geneva Lake Law Enforcement Agency which is partially funded by the village. The Geneva Lake Water Safety Patrol is a private, non-profit organization that promotes safety on Geneva Lake through boat patrols, lifeguard services and educational programs. The Water Safety Patrol is based on the campus of George Williams College.

The Williams Bay Volunteer Fire Department provides fire protections services for the village, while the Williams Bay Rescue Squad provides pre-hospital emergency care and rescue services. Mercyhealth Hospital and Medical Center - Walworth is located a 1/2 mile north of the village.

== Transportation ==
Wisconsin Highway 67 passes through the village's central business district. Wisconsin Highway 50 forms a portion of the village's northern boundary.

No public transportation presently serves Williams Bay, but until the 1960s it was the terminus of the Chicago and North Western Railway. The line also had stops in Como, Lake Geneva, Pell Lake, Genoa City, Richmond, and McHenry, Illinois. The Williams Bay Boat Ramp and Beach now stand on the site of the former railroad station, and a gravel area for sailboat rigging marks the site of the roundhouse. Part of the railroad right-of-way serves as a walking trail in the Kishwauketoe Nature Conservancy.

== Notable people ==
- Edward Emerson Barnard, astronomer
- Subrahmanyan Chandrasekhar, astronomer
- George Ellery Hale, astronomer
- Dara Hobbs, operatic soprano
- Edwin Hubble, astronomer
- Gerard Kuiper, astronomer
- Thomas Lothian, Wisconsin legislator and college professor
- Otto Struve, astronomer
