= University Lake School =

Private school in Delafield, Wisconsin, US

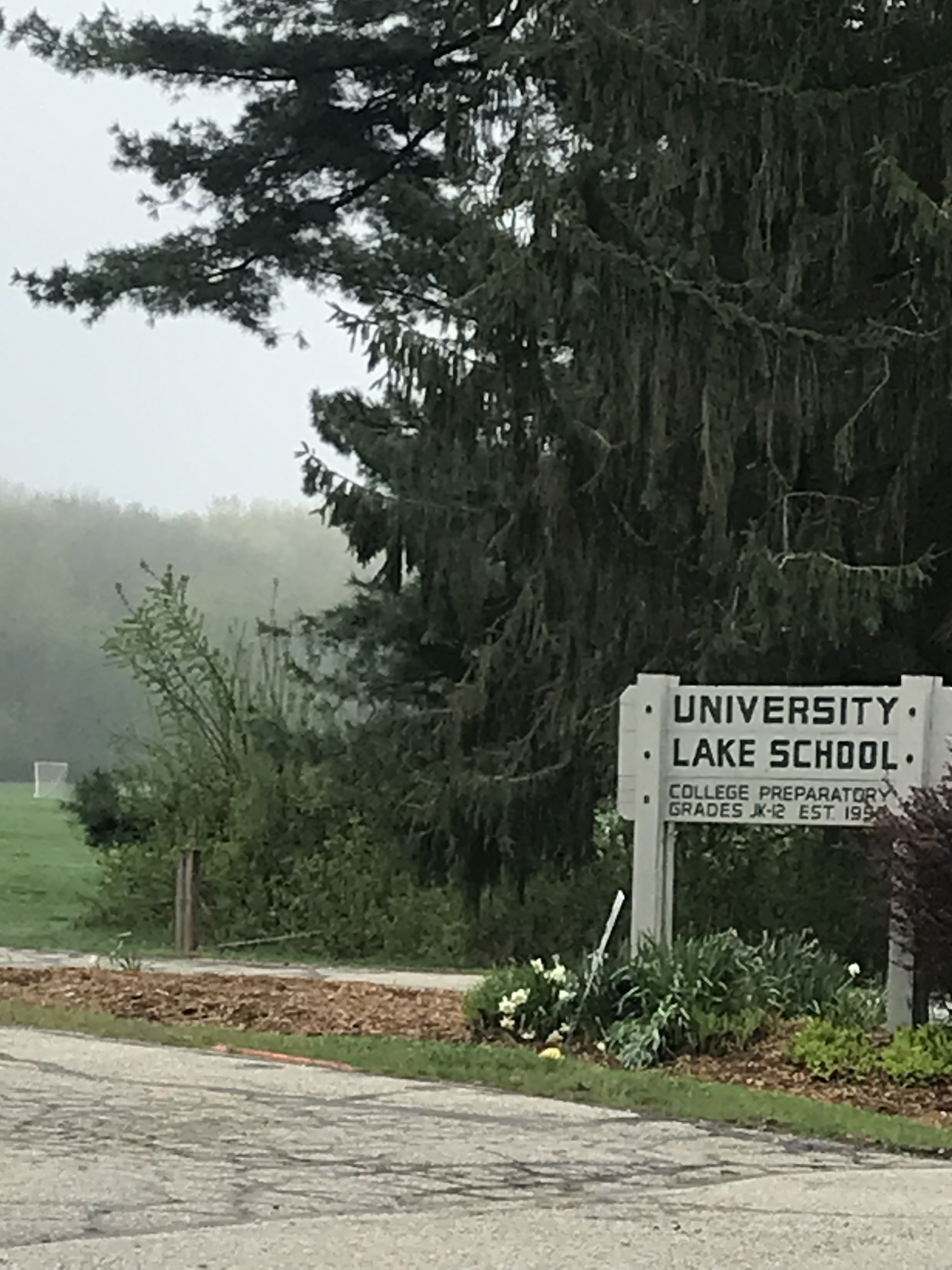

Location
- 4024 Nagawicka Road; Delafield (Hartland address), Wisconsin; United States
- Coordinates: 43°05′53.2″N 88°22′42.2″W

Information
- Type: Private, day
- Motto: Libertas Veritate
- Established: 1956; 70 years ago
- Headmaster: John Dewis
- Faculty: ~60
- Grades: Pre-K to 12
- Enrollment: 102 (upper school)
- Colors: Green and White
- Mascot: "Lakers" or Pine Tree
- Nickname: ULS
- Rival: Brookfield Academy
- Accreditation: ISACS & NAIS
- Website: University Lake School

University Lake School is an independent school in Delafield, in the Lake Country area of Waukesha County in Wisconsin. ULS opened in 1956 on the 1840 Vettelson Farm near the eastern shore of Nagawicka Lake. Anne Vettelson deeded the land to the School on two conditions: that she be allowed to live the remainder of her life on the land and that students chop her fire wood each winter. University Lake School proudly sits on 180 acres of pristine woodland forest boasting a variety of managed ecological niches including restored prairie, crop and vegetable production, hardwood old-growth forest, and oak savannah. ULS is home to deer, turkeys, cranes, a blue heron rookery, domesticated chickens, managed bee hives, sheep, and a herd of goats.

ULS has 265 pupils Pre-Kindergarten thru Grade 12 including a celebrated pre-primary program "Little Lakers" for 2-year-olds. Pre-Kindergarten programming includes a nature-based forest classroom, and the Lower School is based on the student-centered Reggio Emilia educational philosophy. The Middle and Upper Schools combine the highest-calibre academic work with an investigative and research-based approach to topics and disciplines. The student experience is based on fostering genuine relationships in intellectual community and discovering and being accountable to one's passions and talents. Current varsity and junior varsity athletics include soccer, field hockey, volleyball, cross country, basketball, skiing, track, tennis, and golf. The ULS college placement program curates an individual plan for each student to ensure that every graduating senior finds his or her best fit for ongoing academic challenge, career discovery, life adventure, and financing and scholarship at the country's most selective programs. ULS opens its doors and campus to non-enrolled students during the summer for robust academic, athletic, forest, and college preparation.

== History ==
Founding families initially summered in Lake Country from Milwaukee. After World War II they decided to become "year-rounders" and to establish a school adequate to their aims: excellent academics, small classes, preparation for the best colleges, and proximity to nature. The first board president was John M. Friend and the first Headmaster was Joseph de Peyster.

ULS was initially founded out of concern with the quality of an overcrowded public school. Questionnaires were sent out to select families, from business leaders to small farmers; 72 families were interested, which would enroll 178 students.

Other founding officers were: Robert C. Brumder, vice-president, Robert L. Manegold, secretary.

When the school obtained its permanent residence, the executive committee of trustees were: Herbert E Brumder, Robert C. Brumder, Mr and Mrs Edward Yewer, Mr and Mrs David Pabst, Mr and Mrs Paul Hibbard.

== Notable donations ==
Mrs. Herbert Brumder donated $100,000 to the school in memory of her son, who died in a car accident.

Molly Seidel - Won bronze Medal at the 2020 Olympics in Tokyo (Women's Marathon).
