= Brookfield Academy =

Private school Brookfield, Wisconsin, US

Coordinates: 43.082°N 88.145°W

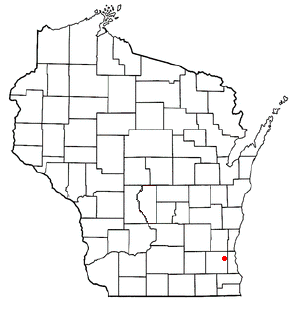
- 3462 N Brookfield Road; Brookfield, Wisconsin 53045; U.S.

Information
- Type: Private, Day
- Established: 1962
- Founder: Walter Davis, Bob Baird, William Smeeth
- Headmaster: Douglas Ricci
- Faculty: 116 (2024–2025)
- Grades: PreK–12
- Enrollment: 894 (2024–2025)
- Colors: Blue and Gold
- Mascot: Blue Knights
- Yearbook: Anabasis
- Website: www.brookfieldacademy.org

Brookfield Academy is a non-sectarian, private PreK–12 school in Brookfield, Wisconsin. The school opened on September 10, 1962, in a converted ranch-style house. The Academy has expanded over the years with new buildings and more teachers and students. In 2025, the Academy had 116 faculty members and more than 890 students on a 125-acre (51-hectare) campus. Brookfield Academy has 25 Advanced Placement courses for students and numerous other clubs and activities.

== History ==
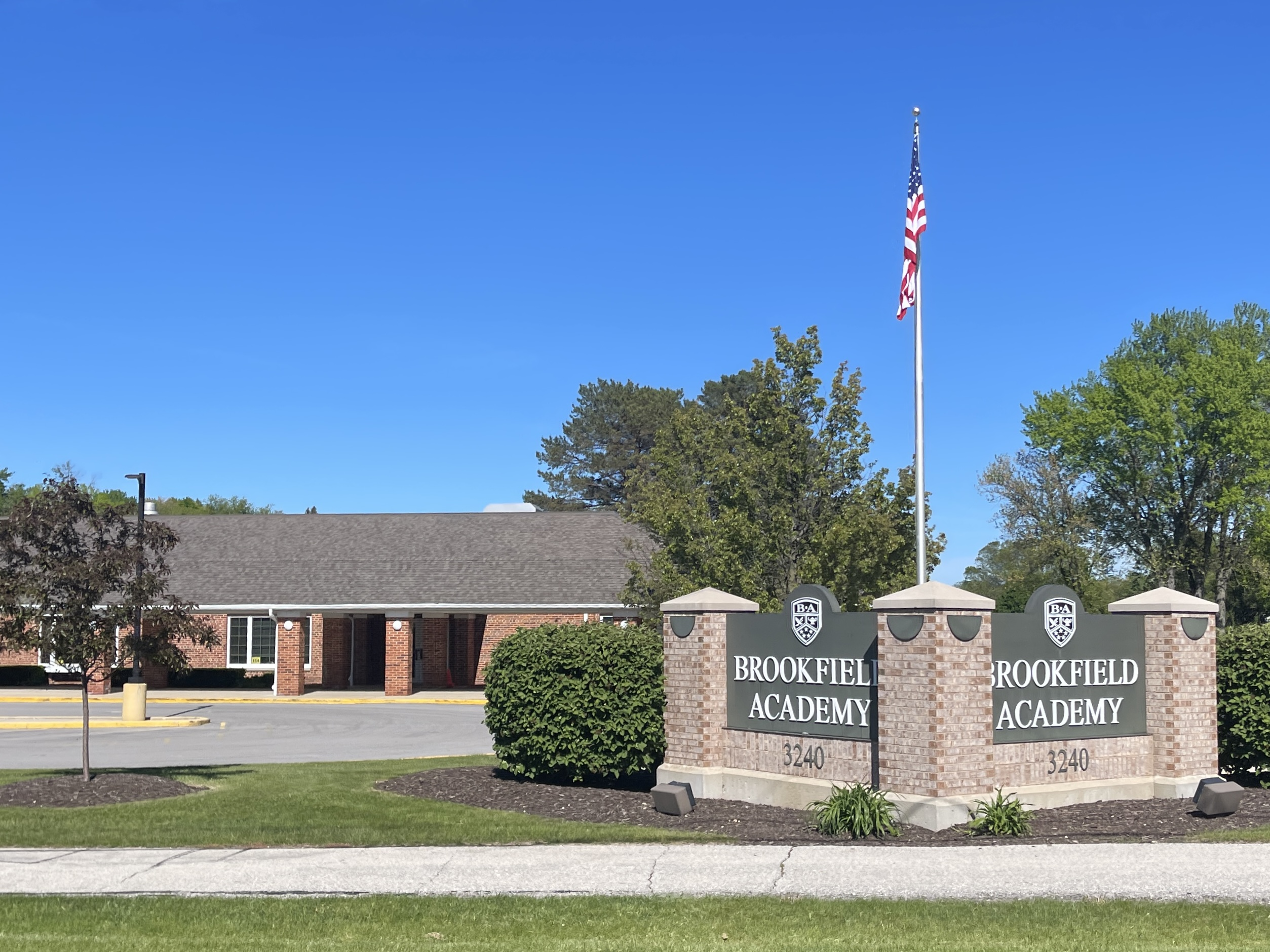
Brookfield Academy's Liberty Hall, Brookfield Wisconsin

In the early 1960s, a few Milwaukee area families gathered to discuss starting their own school. The founders purchased a ranch-style house in Brookfield and converted the house into a school. The school opened on September 10, 1962, with 33 students in grades 1–8 and six teachers. It was initially called the Academy of Basic Education.

The second year, the Academy had 65 students and eight teachers. In 1964, three new classrooms were added and in 1967, a second classroom building called Freedom Hall was built to house the Upper School program, called the College Prep School. The Academy had its first senior class graduation in 1971. More new buildings have been built since.

In 1995, the Academy purchased a 100-acre (40-hectare) farm on the west side of Brookfield Road and the land was developed into an athletic complex and a home for the College Prep School. In 2014, the Academy had 116 faculty members and more than 890 students. As of 2025, the campus occupies 125 acres (51 hectares). Brookfield Academy has 25 Advanced Placement courses for students. Opportunities include performing arts, fine arts, music, writing, volunteer service, club activities, and an athletic program. The Academy also includes a summer program by the name 'Summer Days'.

== Notable alumni ==
- Robert Neff, American gymnast

== See also ==
- Brookfield, Wisconsin
- Waukesha County, Wisconsin
