= Captain Price (disambiguation) =

Captain Price or Capt. Price may refer to:

== People ==
- Anthony Price (1928–2019), British author and army captain
- Charles Price (Royalist) (died 1645), Welsh soldier and politician
- David Price (East India Company officer) (1762–1835), Welsh orientalist and officer in the East India Company army
- David Price (Royal Navy officer) (1790–1854), Royal Navy officer
- Ernest B. Price (1890–1973), American diplomat, university professor, military officer and businessman
- George Edward Price (1842–1926), Royal Navy officer and politician
- Henry Bertram Price (1869–1941), U.S. Navy officer
- Richard Price (Wales MP) (fl. 1653), Welsh politician and Parliamentary army officer
- Thomas Phillips Price (1844–1932), Welsh landowner, politician and Militia officer
- William Price (RAF officer) (1895–1982), World War I flying ace
- William Edwin Price (1841–1886), English politician and Militia officer

== Characters ==
- Captain Marian Price, a Doctor Who character
- Captain Price, a character in the Call of Duty video game franchise.

== See also ==
- Price (surname)
