= Kager Knueppel =

American basketball player (born 2007)

No. 1 – Wisconsin Lutheran Vikings
- Position: Forward
- League: Woodland Conference

Personal information
- Listed height: 6 ft 10 in (2.08 m)

Career information
- High school: Wisconsin Lutheran (Milwaukee, Wisconsin)
- College: Duke (commit)

Kager Knueppel (/kəˈnɪpəl/ kə-NIP-əl) is an American high school basketball player who attends Wisconsin Lutheran High School in Milwaukee, Wisconsin. He is one of the top recruits in the class of 2027 and is committed to playing college basketball for the Duke Blue Devils.

== Early life ==
Knueppel attends Wisconsin Lutheran High School in Milwaukee, Wisconsin. As a freshman in 2023–24, he teamed with his older brother Kon on a Vikings team that went 30–0 and won the Wisconsin Interscholastic Athletic Association (WIAA) Division 2 state championship. As a sophomore, Knueppel averaged 13.5 points, 6.4 rebounds, and 2.8 assists per game. He helped Wisconsin Lutheran compile a 28–2 record and capture the WIAA Division 1 state championship, scoring 10 points in the state title game, a 57–55 win over Marshfield High School. As a junior, Knueppel teamed with two of his brothers, Kinston and Kash, as well as his cousin Zavier Zens. He averaged 16.4 points, 7.2 rebounds, and 3.6 assists per game. Knueppel led the team to a 30–0 record and another WIAA Division 1 state championship. He posted 16 points and seven rebounds in a 57–37 win over Madison Memorial High School in the state title game.

Knueppel played with Team Herro on the Nike Elite Youth Basketball League (EYBL) circuit. In 2025, he helped the team reach the Peach Jam 16U semifinals. In 2026, Knueppel helped Team Herro advance to the Peach Jam 17U semifinals. He averaged 11.6 points, 5.4 rebounds, and three assists across seven games at the tournament. In the same offseason, Knueppel earned an invite to the eighth annual SLAM Summer Classic at Rucker Park in New York City.

=== Recruiting ===
Knueppel is a consensus four-star recruit and one of the top players in the 2027 class, according to major recruiting services. He received his first NCAA Division I offer from Toledo in December 2024. Following additional offers from Butler and DePaul, Knueppel received his first power conference offer from Purdue in January 2026. He picked up an offer from Wisconsin in February, followed by offers from Duke and Texas A&M in April. Knueppel was ranked as the No. 122 recruit in his class by 247Sports before jumping to the No. 28 spot in the June 2026 rankings update. The increased recruiting attention was attributed to strong performances that offseason with Team Herro as well as a growth spurt which shot him up to 6 ft 10 in (2.08 m). Knueppel jumped from the No. 52 recruit to the No. 14 spot in the Rivals.com rankings in July, and was moved into the top 15 by 247Sports the following month after summer evaluations. He also became recognized as one of the best shooters in the country.

On June 29, 2026, Knueppel verbally committed to playing college basketball for the Duke Blue Devils, following in his older brother's footsteps. He also became the first member of Duke's 2027 recruiting class.

== Personal life ==
Knueppel is the second-oldest of five boys; his brothers' names are Kon, Kinston, Kash, and Kidman. When Kon was selected by the Charlotte Hornets in the 2025 NBA draft, the five brothers were interviewed live on the ESPN broadcast by Monica McNutt. Knueppel was born into a basketball family. His parents, Chari (née Nordgaard) and Kon Knueppel, played college basketball at Wisconsin–Green Bay and Wisconsin Lutheran College, respectively, each finishing their careers as their school's all-time leading scorers. His father and his uncles Klint, Klay, and Kole competed in the Gus Macker 3-on-3 and Hoop It Up tournaments as the "Flying Knueppel Brothers" in the 1990s and early 2000s. Kole went on to work as a college football referee in the Big Ten Conference.

On his mother's side, the Nordgaard family is a storied athletic family in Wisconsin that spans several generations. His great-grandfather was Arthur "Bud" Rose, the family patriarch who played football and basketball at NC State and married Charlotte Hill Rose, who competed in basketball, swimming, and archery at UNC Greensboro. Their daughter Eleanor, who excelled in intramural sports at Minnesota–Morris in the pre-Title IX era, married John Nordgaard, who played football and basketball at North Dakota State College of Science and Minnesota–Morris and signed with the Atlanta Falcons of the NFL before being drafted for military service. His father, Wally Nordgaard, played college football and basketball at Minnesota. Eleanor and Jeff had four children, all of whom excelled in sports. The oldest, Jeff, played college basketball at Wisconsin–Green Bay before playing in the NBA for the Milwaukee Bucks and later professionally in Europe. He married Alexis Proffitt, who had a standout college basketball career at Butler, and both of their sons played college sports. Jeff's siblings include Julie (who married basketball coach Tod Kowalczyk), Chari (Knueppel's mother), and Kami, who played volleyball at South Carolina and married former Wisconsin–Whitewater volleyball player Kevin Davis. Kami's son (and Knueppel's cousin), Zavier Zens, plays college basketball at Illinois.
