= Wisconsin Little Ten Conference =

Wisconsin high school athletic conference (1970-2017)

The Wisconsin Little Ten Conference is a former high school athletic conference with its membership based in southeastern Wisconsin. It existed from 1970 to 2017 and all member schools were affiliated with the Wisconsin Interscholastic Athletic Association.

== History ==
Location of Final Wisconsin Little Ten Conference Members

The Wisconsin Little Ten Conference was founded in 1970 after the breakup of the original Little Ten Conference. All six members of the Southern Little Ten (Beaver Dam, Hartford Union, Oconomowoc, Watertown, West Bend East and West Bend West) joined with Waupun (the largest school in the Northern Little Ten) to form its initial membership roster. Wisconsin Lutheran High School in Milwaukee joined the Wisconsin Little Ten in 1974 after leaving the Midwest Prep Conference, bringing membership to eight schools. They were the only private high school in the conference during its history and were members of the Wisconsin Independent Schools Athletic Association prior to its merger with the WIAA in 2000.

The Wisconsin Little Ten's membership roster was remarkably stable over the course of its history. Waupun, historically the smallest school in the conference, left to join the East Central Conference as a football-only member in 1995 and were accepted to full membership in the East Central Flyway Conference in 2004. Slinger became members of the Little Ten Conference in 2006 after they were displaced from the Parkland Conference after its ending. The conference was realigned out of existence in 2017, and all members were dispersed to existing conferences. Four schools (Hartford Union, Slinger, West Bend East and West Bend West) became members of the North Shore Conference, two schools (Beaver Dam and Watertown) joined the Badger Conference, Oconomowoc was accepted into the Classic 8 Conference and Wisconsin Lutheran entered the Woodland Conference.

== Conference membership history ==
=== Final members ===
School	Location	Affiliation	Mascot	Colors	Joined	Left	Conference Joined	Current Conference
Beaver Dam	Beaver Dam, WI	Public	Golden Beavers		1970	2017	Badger	
Hartford Union	Hartford, WI	Public	Orioles		1970	2017	North Shore	
Oconomowoc	Oconomowoc, WI	Public	Racoons		1970	2017	Classic 8	
Slinger	Slinger, Wisconsin	Public	Owls		2006	2017	North Shore	
Watertown	Watertown, WI	Public	Goslings		1970	2017	Badger	
West Bend East	West Bend, WI	Public	Suns		1970	2017	North Shore	Glacier Trails
West Bend West	West Bend, WI	Public	Spartans		1970	2017	North Shore	Glacier Trails
Wisconsin Lutheran	Milwaukee, WI	Private (Lutheran, WELS)	Vikings		1974	2017	Woodland	

=== Previous members ===
School	Location	Affiliation	Mascot	Colors	Joined	Left	Conference Joined	Current Conference
Waupun	Waupun, WI	Public	Warriors		1970	2004	East Central Flyway	Capitol

== List of state champions ==
=== Fall sports ===
Boys Cross Country
School	Year	Organization	Division
West Bend West	1993	WIAA	Division 1
Wisconsin Lutheran	2011	WIAA	Division 2
Wisconsin Lutheran	2013	WIAA	Division 2
Wisconsin Lutheran	2014	WIAA	Division 2

Football
School	Year	Organization	Division
Beaver Dam	1979	WIAA	Division 2
Wisconsin Lutheran	1998	WISAA	Division 1
Wisconsin Lutheran	2004	WIAA	Division 3
Wisconsin Lutheran	2005	WIAA	Division 3
Wisconsin Lutheran	2007	WIAA	Division 3
Wisconsin Lutheran	2014	WIAA	Division 3

Boys Golf
School	Year	Organization	Division
Wisconsin Lutheran	1989	WISAA	Single Division

Girls Volleyball
School	Year	Organization	Division
West Bend East	1983	WIAA	Class A
Waupun	1993	WIAA	Division 2
West Bend East	1993	WIAA	Division 1
Waupun	1995	WIAA	Division 2
West Bend East	1995	WIAA	Division 1
Wisconsin Lutheran	1995	WISAA	Division 1
Waupun	1996	WIAA	Division 2
Wisconsin Lutheran	1996	WISAA	Division 1
Waupun	1997	WIAA	Division 2
West Bend East	1997	WIAA	Division 1
Waupun	1999	WIAA	Division 2
West Bend East	1999	WIAA	Division 1
West Bend East	2000	WIAA	Division 1
Waupun	2001	WIAA	Division 2
Waupun	2002	WIAA	Division 2
Waupun	2003	WIAA	Division 2
Watertown	2007	WIAA	Division 1

=== Winter sports ===
Boys Basketball
School	Year	Organization	Division
Wisconsin Lutheran	2009	WIAA	Division 2
Wisconsin Lutheran	2014	WIAA	Division 2

Girls Basketball
School	Year	Organization	Division
Watertown	1977	WIAA	Class A
West Bend East	1984	WIAA	Class A
Hartford Union	1992	WIAA	Division 1
Wisconsin Lutheran	1994	WISAA	Division 1
Beaver Dam	2017	WIAA	Division 2

Boys Wrestling
School	Year	Organization	Division
Hartford Union	1990	WIAA	Class A

=== Spring sports ===
Baseball
School	Year	Organization	Division
Oconomowoc	1980	WIAA	Class A
Oconomowoc	1981	WIAA	Class A
Watertown	1999	WIAA	Division 1
Wisconsin Lutheran	2000	WISAA	Single Division

Softball
School	Year	Organization	Division
Hartford Union	1987	WIAA	Class A
Wisconsin Lutheran	1996	WISAA	Division 1
Wisconsin Lutheran	1997	WISAA	Division 1
Wisconsin Lutheran	1999	WISAA	Division 1
Wisconsin Lutheran	2000	WISAA	Division 1

Boys Track & Field
School	Year	Organization	Division
Wisconsin Lutheran	1987	WISAA	Class A
Wisconsin Lutheran	1993	WISAA	Division 1
Wisconsin Lutheran	1994	WISAA	Division 1
Wisconsin Lutheran	1997	WISAA	Division 1

Girls Track & Field
School	Year	Organization	Division
Wisconsin Lutheran	1998	WISAA	Division 1

=== Summer sports ===
Baseball
School	Year	Organization	Division
West Bend West	1972	WIAA	Single Division
West Bend West	1984	WIAA	Single Division
West Bend East	1993	WIAA	Single Division
West Bend East	1999	WIAA	Single Division
West Bend East	2002	WIAA	Single Division
West Bend West	2007	WIAA	Single Division
West Bend West	2017	WIAA	Single Division

== List of conference champions ==
=== Boys Basketball ===
School	Quantity	Years
Wisconsin Lutheran	15	1978, 1979, 1981, 1984, 2001, 2006, 2007, 2008, 2009, 2010, 2011, 2012, 2013, 2014, 2015
Watertown	13	1972, 1980, 1982, 1983, 1985, 1986, 1991, 1992, 1994, 1996, 1997, 2003, 2005
Beaver Dam	7	1971, 1972, 1976, 1977, 1993, 1998, 2017
West Bend East	7	1976, 1982, 1987, 1988, 1995, 2000, 2002
Oconomowoc	5	1978, 1989, 1990, 2004, 2016
West Bend West	5	1972, 1973, 1975, 1999, 2002
Waupun	2	1974, 1975
Hartford Union	1	1973
Slinger	0	

=== Girls Basketball ===
School	Quantity	Years
Watertown	13	1979, 1980, 1981, 1985, 1987, 1990, 1991, 1996, 1997, 2000, 2003, 2004, 2006
Beaver Dam	11	1977, 1996, 1997, 2010, 2011, 2012, 2013, 2014, 2015, 2016, 2017
Hartford Union	11	1976, 1984, 1985, 1986, 1988, 1989, 1992, 1996, 1999, 2001, 2002
Wisconsin Lutheran	6	1979, 1993, 1994, 2008, 2009, 2014
Oconomowoc	5	1978, 1995, 1998, 2007, 2011
West Bend East	4	1982, 1983, 1984, 2007
Waupun	1	1996
West Bend West	1	2005
Slinger	0	

=== Football ===
School	Quantity	Years
Wisconsin Lutheran	18	1975, 1993, 1995, 1997, 1998, 1999, 2000, 2002, 2003, 2004, 2005, 2006, 2008, 2009, 2011, 2012, 2014, 2016
Hartford Union	13	1970, 1971, 1972, 1973, 1976, 1991, 1992, 1994, 1998, 2002, 2006, 2007, 2010
Oconomowoc	12	1973, 1978, 1983, 1984, 1986, 1987, 1988, 2001, 2002, 2013, 2015, 2016
Beaver Dam	9	1971, 1973, 1974, 1977, 1979, 1980, 1981, 1982, 1983
Watertown	5	1973, 1985, 1990, 1995, 1996
West Bend East	1	1989
West Bend West	1	2006
Slinger	0	
Waupun	0	
