= Milwaukee Lutheran High School =

Milwaukee Lutheran Middle & High School

Location
- Milwaukee, Wisconsin; United States; 43°05′46.1″N 88°02′02.4″W

Information
- Type: Private Co-ed School
- Religious affiliation: Lutheran Church – Missouri Synod
- Established: 1903
- Oversight: Lutheran High School Association of Greater Milwaukee
- Principal: Dr. Wayne Jensen
- Grades: 6-12
- Enrollment: ~1,200
- Colors: Red, Light Grey, Maroon
- Athletics conference: Woodland Conference
- Mascot: Red Knight
- Accreditation: North Central Association
- Website: www.milwaukeelutheran.org

Milwaukee Lutheran Middle & High School is a school located in Milwaukee, in the U.S. state of Wisconsin. The school was originally known as Lutheran High School, established in 1903, making Milwaukee Lutheran one of the two oldest Lutheran high schools in the United States. In the 1950s, doctrinal differences between the two synods operating the school resulted in each forming its own school.

Milwaukee Lutheran is owned and operated by Lutheran Church – Missouri Synod (LCMS) congregations and the Lutheran High School Association of Greater Milwaukee (LHSAGM), and is accredited by the North Central Association of Colleges and Schools. Milwaukee Lutheran has twice been recognized as a National Exemplary School (Blue Ribbon School) by the U.S. Department of Education. In 1995, the LCMS honored Milwaukee Lutheran as a "Recognized School of Excellence".

== History ==
In 1903, a group of Lutheran pastors, teachers, and laymen from congregations affiliated with the Wisconsin and Missouri synods started a high school in an unused classroom of Immanuel Lutheran School in Milwaukee with 18 students.) In 1904, it relocated to the former site of the Wisconsin Synod's seminary at 13th and Vine streets. Enrollment increased to 340 in 1929 and led to construction of additional buildings at the site. The Great Depression caused enrollment to decline to 265 in 1938, but with the end of the depression, enrollment steadily increased to 848 in 1948. Plans were initiated to build a larger school at a new site, but doctrinal differences between the two synods resulted in the decision for each synod to build its own separate high school and dissolve the joint operation. The Missouri Synod congregations opened Milwaukee Lutheran in September 1955, marking the end of the joint operation of the school. The Wisconsin Synod congregations continued to use the old campus for their school, Wisconsin Lutheran High School, until their new building opened in September 1959.

Twenty-seven Missouri Synod congregations formed "The Lutheran High School Association of Greater Milwaukee" on January 23, 1952. Margaret Schnellbaecher donated approximately 14 acres (5.7 ha) of land at 97th Street and West Grantosa Drive for the new Milwaukee Lutheran High School, and the association obtained approximately 14 acres (5.7 ha) of adjoining land from the city to form a 28-acre (11 ha) campus. Plans for the new school were prepared by the architectural firm Grassold-Johnson and Associates. The cost was projected to be about $2 million, and pledges for that amount were raised by June 1953. Ground was broken on August 22, 1954, and construction of the main building was sufficiently complete to accept students on September 12, 1955, on which date 806 students and 27 faculty members entered the facility. By May 1956, the music rooms and the gymnasium with its swimming pool had been completed, and the formal dedication occurred during the senior graduation ceremonies on May 6.

Milwaukee Lutheran received accreditation from the North Central Association of Colleges and Schools in 1959. An additional six classrooms and other facilities were added in 1960. Enrollment increased to 1,250 students by 1963, which was over the facility's capacity. The Milwaukee Lutheran Fieldhouse opened on the campus in 1998.

In 2022 the Milwaukee Lutheran Virtual Campus was started to provide a Christian education to students who were seeking a virtual school option. Unlike many virtual programs, this one was synchronous and live with instructors. By 2025, Milwaukee Lutheran was serving over 1,200 students, including 850 in-person learners and 250 virtual campus learners.

In 2025, Milwaukee Lutheran announced the launch of a middle school, beginning with 6th grade in the 2026-27 school year. Along with this expansion, Milwaukee Lutheran refreshed its academic branding and website.

== Athletic conference affiliation history ==
- Wisconsin Prep Conference (1940–1952)
- Midwest Prep Conference (1952–1974)
- Metro Conference (1974–1997)
- North Shore Conference (1997–2017)
- Woodland Conference (2017–present)

== Notable alumni ==
- Fred Kessler, judge and former Wisconsin state legislator
- Donald Knuth - author of The Art of Computer Programming
- Brian Mueller, president and CEO of Grand Canyon University
- Don Pridemore, legislator and politician
- William Raabe, PhD, business professor and author. Endowed ALCM Raabe Prize for Sacred Music and MLHS Raabe Honors Academy.
- John Rhodes, assistant men's basketball coach at Duquesne University
- Nick Roach - NFL football player for the Oakland Raiders
- Tina Salaks, former ASPCA officer, star of Animal Planet's "Animal Precinct" show
- Martin J. Schreiber, Governor of Wisconsin, 1977–1979.
- Barbara Ulichny - Wisconsin State Senator
