= Kon Knueppel =

American basketball player (born 2005)

No. 7 – Charlotte Hornets
- Position: Small forward / shooting guard
- League: NBA

Personal information
- Born: August 3, 2005 (age 21) Milwaukee, Wisconsin, U.S.
- Listed height: 6 ft 6 in (1.98 m)
- Listed weight: 215 lb (98 kg)

Career information
- High school: Wisconsin Lutheran (Milwaukee, Wisconsin)
- College: Duke (2024–2025)
- NBA draft: 2025: 1st round, 4th overall pick
- Drafted by: Charlotte Hornets
- Playing career: 2025–present

Career history
- 2025–present: Charlotte Hornets

Career highlights
- NBA All-Rookie First Team (2026); Second-team All-ACC (2025); ACC All-Freshman Team (2025); ACC tournament MVP (2025); Wisconsin Mr. Basketball (2024)
- Stats at NBA.com
- Stats at Basketball Reference

Kon Knueppel (/kəˈnɪpəl/ kə-NIP-əl; born August 3, 2005) is an American professional basketball player for the Charlotte Hornets of the National Basketball Association (NBA). He played college basketball for the Duke Blue Devils and was drafted fourth overall in the 2025 NBA draft by the Hornets.

== Early life and high school career ==
Knueppel grew up in Milwaukee, Wisconsin, and attended Wisconsin Lutheran High School. He averaged 10.8 points, 4.7 rebounds and 2.2 assists per game during his freshman season with the Wisconsin Lutheran Vikings. Knueppel averaged 19.7 points, 9.2 rebounds and 3.8 assists per game as a junior. As a senior, he averaged 26.4 points, 8.8 rebounds and 5.1 assists per game during the regular season and was named Wisconsin Mr. Basketball. He helped Wisconsin Lutheran win the 2024 Boys Basketball Division 2 State Championship against Pewaukee and finish the season with a 30–0 record.

=== Recruiting ===
Knueppel was rated a five-star recruit by 247Sports and Rivals and a four-star recruit by ESPN and On3. He committed to playing college basketball for Duke over offers from Alabama, Virginia, Wisconsin, Notre Dame, Marquette and USC among others. Knueppel signed a National Letter of Intent to play for the Blue Devils on November 15, 2023, during the early signing period.

College recruiting
Name	Hometown	School	Height	Weight	Commit date
Kon Knueppel; SG / SF	Milwaukee, WI	Wisconsin Lutheran (WI)	6 ft 5 in (1.96 m)	205 lb (93 kg)	Sep 21, 2023
Kon Knueppel; SG / SF	Recruit ratings: Rivals: 247Sports: On3: ESPN: (89)				
Overall recruit ranking: Rivals: 9 247Sports: 18 On3: 18 ESPN: 19
Note: In many cases, Scout, Rivals, 247Sports, On3, and ESPN may conflict in their listings of height and weight.; In these cases, the average was taken. ESPN grades are on a 100-point scale.; Sources: "Duke 2024 Basketball Commitments". Rivals.; "2024 Duke Blue Devils Recruiting Class". ESPN.; "2024 Team Ranking". Rivals.

== College career ==
Knueppel enrolled at Duke University in June 2024 in order to take part in the Blue Devils' summer practices. He made his college basketball debut during Duke's season opener against Maine on November 4, 2024, and tallied 22 points with four rebounds in a 96–62 win. On November 11, 2024, Knueppel earned Atlantic Coast Conference (ACC) Rookie of the week honors, after averaging 18.5 points, three rebounds and two assists per game.

On December 21, 2024, Knueppel scored 18 points and grabbed 4 rebounds in a 82–56 win over Georgia Tech. On January 7, 2025, Knueppel recorded 17 points and 4 rebounds in a 76–47 victory against Pittsburgh. On January 14, 2025, Knueppel scored 25 points and dished out 3 assists in a 89–54 win over Miami. On January 25, 2025, Knueppel added 15 points and 8 rebounds in a 63–56 victory against Wake Forest. On January 27, 2025, Knueppel put up 19 points and 6 rebounds in a 74–64 win over NC State. On February 1, 2025, Knueppel scored 22 points in a 87–70 victory against arch-rival North Carolina. On February 17, 2025, Knueppel added 17 points and 7 rebounds in a 80–62 win over Virginia. On February 25, 2025, Knueppel posted 20 points and 5 rebounds in a 97–60 win against Miami.

On March 15, 2025, Knueppel was named ACC tournament MVP as he scored 18 points and grabbed 8 rebounds in Duke's 73–62 victory over Louisville in the ACC championship game.

== Professional career ==
=== Charlotte Hornets (2025–present) ===
==== All-Rookie honors and three-point scoring leader (2025–2026) ====
Knueppel was selected with the fourth overall pick by the Charlotte Hornets in the 2025 NBA draft. He led the Hornets to become the 2025 NBA Summer League Champions. For his efforts, he was awarded the Summer League Championship MVP, as he put up 21 points, five rebounds and two assists in an 83–78 win over the Sacramento Kings. Knueppel made his NBA regular season debut on October 22, recording 11 points and five rebounds in a 136–117 win over the Brooklyn Nets. Following a string of strong performances including a 30-point game against Miami Heat, Knueppel was nominated for the Eastern Conference Player of the Week on November 9. He continued his form with a near triple-double on the same day in a 121–111 loss against the Los Angeles Lakers, logging 19 points, 10 rebounds and nine assists. On November 14, Knueppel scored a then-career-high 32 points in a 147–134 overtime loss against his hometown team, the Milwaukee Bucks, including two late three-point buckets to tie the game and send it to overtime. Knueppel received his second nomination for Eastern Conference Player of the Week on November 23 after averaging over 26.5 points, 5.5 rebounds and three assists over four games that week. On November 19, he set a record as the fastest NBA player to make 50 three-point shots, doing so in his 15th game. On December 2, Knueppel was named Eastern Conference Rookie of the Month for November, ahead of teammate Ryan Kalkbrenner and Philadelphia 76ers' V. J. Edgecombe. Knueppel averaged over 18 points, five rebounds and three assists for the month. On December 22, he achieved his 100th career three-pointer in a game against the Cleveland Cavaliers. He did so in just his 29th career game, setting a record for the fastest to 100 career three-pointers made in NBA history and surpassing Lauri Markkanen's previous record by 12 games.

On January 29, 2026, Knueppel scored a career-high 34 points on eight three-pointers made in a 123–121 win over the Dallas Mavericks and their star rookie Cooper Flagg. His eight three-pointers made set a record for the most three-pointers made by a rookie in Hornets franchise history. On February 24, he became the fastest NBA player to make 200 career three point shots in his 58th game, surpassing Duncan Robinson's record of 69 games. On February 26, in a game against the Indiana Pacers, Knueppel made his 207th career three-pointer, surpassing Keegan Murray's previous record (206) for the most three-pointers made in a season by a rookie in NBA history. On April 2, Knueppel made his 261st career three-pointer in a 127–107 win over the Phoenix Suns, surpassing Kemba Walker’s previous record for the most three-pointers made in a season in Hornets franchise history. Knueppel finished the regular season with a league-leading 273 made three-pointers, becoming the first rookie to lead the league in three-pointers made in a season in NBA history. He and his teammate, LaMelo Ball, also became the first duo since Stephen Curry and Klay Thompson to each have 270+ three-pointers made in a season. After the regular season, Knueppel finished second in NBA Rookie of the Year voting behind Cooper Flagg and was selected to the NBA All-Rookie First Team.

== Career statistics ==
Legend
GP	Games played	GS	Games started	MPG	Minutes per game
FG%	Field goal percentage	3P%	3-point field goal percentage	FT%	Free throw percentage
RPG	Rebounds per game	APG	Assists per game	SPG	Steals per game
BPG	Blocks per game	PPG	Points per game	**Bold**	Career high

=== NBA ===
Year	Team	GP	GS	MPG	FG%	3P%	FT%	RPG	APG	SPG	BPG	PPG
2025–26	Charlotte	81	80	31.5	.475	.425	.863	5.3	3.4	.7	.2	18.5
Career		81	80	31.5	.475	.425	.863	5.3	3.4	.7	.2	18.5

=== College ===
Year	Team	GP	GS	MPG	FG%	3P%	FT%	RPG	APG	SPG	BPG	PPG
2024–25	Duke	39	39	30.5	.479	.406	.914	4.0	2.7	1.0	.2	14.4

== Personal life ==
Knueppel is a Christian. He went to grade school and attended church at St. John’s Lutheran of the Wisconsin Evangelical Lutheran Synod in Wauwatosa, Wisconsin.

Knueppel is the oldest of five boys, and his brothers' names—in order of birth—are Kager, Kinston, Kash and Kidman. The second oldest brother, Kager, committed to play college basketball for the Duke Blue Devils. His father, also named Kon, played college basketball at Wisconsin Lutheran College and was the school's all-time leading scorer until 2019. His father and his uncles Klint, Klay and Kole competed in the Gus Macker 3-on-3 Basketball Tournament as a team named the "Flying Knueppel Brothers", eschewing the more humorous name, "Free the Knueppel." Kole is now a college football referee in the Big Ten Conference. Knueppel's mother, Chari (née Nordgaard), played at Wisconsin-Green Bay and was the school's leading scorer. Knueppel's uncle, Jeff Nordgaard, also played at Wisconsin-Green Bay and played in the NBA for the Milwaukee Bucks, as well as professionally in Europe.

During the Hornets' first road trip to Milwaukee during Knueppel's rookie season, he and his family hosted the entire team for dinner at his childhood home.

== See also ==
- List of NBA annual 3-point scoring leaders
- List of NBA regular season records
- List of NBA career 3-point scoring leaders
