= Daniel E. LaBar =

American politician

Daniel E. LaBar (sometimes spelled Labar or La Bar) (August 21, 1857 – July 21, 1939) was a member of the Wisconsin State Assembly.

== Biography ==
LaBar was born on August 21, 1857, in Delavan (town), Wisconsin. He graduated from Wayland Academy in Beaver Dam, Wisconsin. He died in Delevan in 1939 as the result of a heart attack followed by pneumonia.

== Career ==
LaBar was a member of the Assembly during the 1929, 1931, 1933, and 1935 sessions. Previously, he had been a Delavan, Wisconsin, alderman (similar to city councilman) from 1901 to 1905, a member of the County Board of Walworth County, Wisconsin, from 1906 to 1907 and mayor of Delavan from 1908 to 1910 and again from 1912 to 1916. He retired in 1936.
