= Edgar E. Lien =

American politician

Edgar E. Lien was a member of the Wisconsin State Assembly.

== Biography ==
Lien was born on August 3, 1936, in Milwaukee, Wisconsin. He graduated from Lutheran High School in Milwaukee and Valparaiso University and would serve in the Wisconsin Army National Guard. Lien died of pancreatic cancer on October 30, 2000, in Madison, Wisconsin.

== Political career ==
Lien was elected to the Assembly in 1962. Additionally, he was City Attorney of Bloomer, Wisconsin. He was a Republican.
