= Lutheran High School (Milwaukee) =

Location
- 13th and Vine Streets (Note: The 1894 Sanborn Insurance Map for the area (Milwaukee 1894 Volume 2 (Map). 1:600. New York: Sanborn Map Co. 1894. pp. 167, 168.) shows the frame seminary building just south of Vine Street, which was the second street south of Lloyd Street. The 1910 Sanborn map (Milwaukee 1910 Volume 3 (Map). 1:600. New York: Sanborn Map Co. 1910. p. 245.) shows the new high school building as being located on 13th Street just south of Wine (not Vine) Street, which again is the second street south of Lloyd. Other maps from that era also show that street as Wine or Vine. In 1928-1929, the city of Milwaukee renamed dozens of streets and changed address numbers to provide consistency and eliminate duplicate and similar-sounding names. Wine/Vine Street was renamed Reservoir Avenue according to later maps. The fire station that the city built on the site after buying it from the high school conference in 1959 is situated at the corner of N. 13th Street and W. Reservoir Avenue. The current Vine Street is a block south of Reservoir Avenue and was named Sherman on the Sanborn and other early maps.); Milwaukee, Wisconsin; United States; 43°03′19″N 87°55′43″W

Information
- School type: Private
- Religious affiliation: Evangelical Lutheran Synodical Conference
- Established: 1903
- Status: Closed
- Closed: 1955
- Authority: Evangelical Lutheran High School Convention
- Grades: 9-12
- Campus size: 3 acres (1.2 ha)
- Athletics conference: Wisconsin Prep Conference (1940-1953); Midwest Prep Conference (1953-1955)
- Nickname: Knights

The Lutheran High School of Milwaukee was a Lutheran high school operated by congregations of the Missouri and Wisconsin synods in the Milwaukee, Wisconsin, area from 1903 to 1955. Started in an unused classroom of Immanuel Lutheran School with 18 students, it moved in 1904 to the former site of the Wisconsin Synod's seminary at 13th and Vine streets. Enrollment increased to 340 in 1929 and led to construction of additional buildings at the site. The Great Depression caused enrollment to decline to 265 in 1938, but with the end of the depression, enrollment steadily increased to 848 in 1948. Plans were initiated to build a larger school at a new site, but doctrinal differences between the two synods resulted in the decision for each synod to build its own separate high school and dissolve the joint operation. The Missouri Synod congregations opened Milwaukee Lutheran High School in September 1955, while the Wisconsin Synod congregations used the old campus for their school, Wisconsin Lutheran High School, until their new building opened in September 1959. The enrollment in the final year of joint operation, 1954–1955, was over 1,100. Both of the successor schools consider 1903 to be their founding date.

== History ==
=== Beginnings ===
In 1902, Pastor August Pieper of St. Marcus Lutheran Church in Milwaukee proposed establishing a high school for Lutherans at a pastoral conference of the Wisconsin Synod, but the immediate reaction was discouraging. However, two of the pastors in attendance became supporters and recruited two like-minded Lutheran businessmen to form the Evangelical Lutheran High School Association in July 1903 and solicit for additional members.

In September 1903, Milwaukee Evangelical Lutheran Akademie for girls was opened in an unused classroom of Immanuel Lutheran Church's grade school building on the southeast corner of North Avenue and Twelfth Street. The high school used volunteer instructors consisting of teachers from the local Lutheran grade schools, pastors, pastors' wives, and Pieper (who had become a professor at the Wisconsin Synod seminary), and was not officially under the control of the High School Association. The first class consisted of 18 girls from Milwaukee and the surrounding area. A separate evening school for boys, using a separate faculty and curriculum, was opened that same year.

The first year of the high school ended on Palm Sunday because that was when eighth grade pupils in the local Lutheran grade schools were confirmed, and the second year of the high school began immediately after Easter 1904; the start of the school year was changed to September in 1909. To accommodate the second class, a room across the street from Immanuel's school was rented. At this time the High School Association formally took over operation of the high school. Recognizing that more space would be needed, it rented the frame building at 13th and Vine streets that had formerly housed the Wisconsin Synod seminary. The fall 1904 semester opened in the new location with 48 students, of which 10 were male, thereby making the high school co-educational.

The old seminary building was quickly outgrown and the association decided to build a new school on the same 3-acre (1.2 ha) site, which they had by then purchased. The new brick building was dedicated in the autumn of 1908 and contained three regular classrooms and several other rooms, allowing for an enrollment of about 150. The cost of the land and the new building, along with a director's home on the same site, was about $40,000. The school faced financial difficulties during the next decade, and in September 1914, still owed $23,700 on the debt incurred to build the new school building.

=== Growth and Depression ===
In 1918, ownership of the school and its property, along with debt that in 1921 amounted to $12,000, passed from the association to the Evangelical Lutheran High School Conference. The conference consisted of a group of 18 congregations of the Evangelical Lutheran Synodical Conference, whereas the association had consisted of individual Lutherans. It was hoped that the direct congregational support would stabilize the financial situation.

In 1921, enrollment jumped from 128 to 170, severely overcrowding the school. In January 1922, The conference approved plans to build a large addition and borrowed $32,000 to start construction immediately while fundraising was conducted. Enrollment increased to 209 in September of that year, and the contractors was pressed to finish construction. The addition was dedicated on June 10, 1923 and cost $50,199.35. It contained three classrooms, offices, an assembly hall, and a new heating plant. In 1926–1927, a frame gymnasium measuring 70 feet (21 m) long and 50 feet (15 m) wide was also constructed.

From 1908 to 1920, the faculty consisted of three full-time permanent teachers plus several part-timers. A fourth full-time teacher was added in November 1920, and a fifth in October 1922. By the 1927–1928 school year, faculty staffing had increased to 12, of which eight were full time instructors. Enrollment had also increased to 327 in 1928.

The continual increase in enrollment again led to overcrowding. Several solutions were considered: transferring one class to the south side of Milwaukee, thereby establishing a second Lutheran high school; rebuilding the assembly hall; or finding classrooms elsewhere in the neighborhood. All three were rejected as unfeasible. In October 1927, Herman Feihube of Immanuel Lutheran Church offered to build a north wing to the existing facility provided that the congregations of the conference would liquidate the existing debt. By January 1928, the congregations had promised $23.000, and that spring, construction began. On September 30, 1928, the new wing was dedicated, providing two regular classrooms, a science room, and a chemistry/physics lab. The wing also contained the school's first cafeteria, lunchroom, and bookstore. By October 1928, the total debt had been reduced to $19,425.

Enrollment increased to 340 in September 1929, leading again to consideration of a second high school, but the Great Depression led to enrollment declines thereafter, reaching a low of 265 in 1938. Faculty salaries were reduced, and sometimes delayed. Nevertheless, the high school received state accreditation from the University of Wisconsin in 1937.

=== Post-Depression growth ===
The end of the Depression led to increasing enrollment: 305 in 1939, 359 in 1940, 408 in 1941, 509 in 1942, 635 in 1943, 713 in 1944, 803 in 1945, and 848 in 1946. To handle the increase, the gymnasium was converted into four classrooms, and physical training and some athletics were transferred to the Lutheran Center, which was a mile away. Then two temporary long barracks were built next to the existing buildings, providing six classrooms. The school schedule was rearranged to allow for two, and later, three, lunch periods. Two classrooms in the main building were used to provide a larger faculty room (the faculty having grown to 37 full- and part-time teachers), more office space and a library. Nevertheless, it was necessary run the school day in shifts starting at 7:00 am and ending at 5:30 pm to handle the numbers.

At the April 16, 1943, meeting of the Lutheran High School Conference, three options for handling the increased enrollment were discussed. The first was to remodel and expand on the current site. The second was to relocate and build an entire new school. The third was to acquire property and build the first phase of a new high school. The second option was adopted. In June 1946, the conference recommended the purchase of a 5 1/2-acre (2.2 ha) site on Story Parkway, but the purchase was not completed because the city's planned expressway system would make the site unusable for a high school. In November 1948, the conference authorized the board of directors to find a new site and proceed with the building program.

=== Division ===
About the same time that the need for a new high school had become a priority, doctrinal differences between the Missouri and Wisconsin synods were surfacing. These differences would eventually lead to the Wisconsin Synod to leave the Synodical Conference, but more immediately they made the pastors of the Wisconsin Synod congregations in the Lutheran High School Conference reluctant to support a building program for a joint high school. After much discussion, the conference decided on December 11, 1951, that the best solution would be to divide into two associations, one for each synod, that would each build a new school.

Twenty-seven Missouri Synod congregations formed "The Lutheran High School Association of Greater Milwaukee" on January 23, 1952. The association obtained approximately 28 acres (11 ha) of land at 97th Street and West Grantosa Drive for the new Milwaukee Lutheran High School. The cost was projected to be about $2 million, and pledges for that amount were raised by June 1953. Ground was broken on August 22, 1954, and construction of the main building was sufficiently complete to accept students on September 12, 1955, on which date 806 students and 27 faculty members entered the facility. By May 1956, the music rooms and the gymnasium with its swimming pool had been completed, and the formal dedication occurred during the senior graduation ceremonies on May 6.

The Wisconsin Synod congregations formed "The Wisconsin Lutheran High School Convention" also in 1952. The convention conducted a study that found that 60% of Wisconsin Synod members lived north of the Menomonee Valley and 40% lived south of it. This meant that either one high school in the middle of the city or both north and south high schools would be needed. Accepting a donation of acreage north of Capitol Drive at about 100th Street would have required the latter option, so the offer was rejected and the convention looked for land in the middle of the city. Eventually the convention obtained 13 acres (5.3 ha) on Glenview Drive near Blue Mound Road. The Wisconsin Lutheran High School facility, including equipment, cost $2.25 million and was dedicated on September 21, 1959. Until then the convention rented the old Lutheran High School facility after the departure of the Missouri Synod contingent.

The old high school was subsequently sold to the city of Milwaukee, who built a fire station there, and the proceeds were divided equally between the two groups. Enrollment during the final school year (1954-1955) of the jointly-operated Lutheran High School was over 1,100.

== Athletics ==
Although students of Lutheran High School had played in the Lutheran Young Men's Baseball League starting in 1910, the team was not sponsored by the school. In 1920–1923, alumni formed a basketball team that played in the Lutheran League, leading to the school formally sponsoring a boys' basketball team in 1924–1925, and both boys' and girls' teams starting in the fall of 1925. In 1940, Lutheran was a founding member of the Wisconsin Prep Conference. That conference was renamed the Midwest Prep Conference in 1952 when two Illinois-based schools joined as members.

Besides basketball, the school offered football from 1929 to 1938, initiating it again in 1945. Baseball was added in 1945. A track team had also been fielded by 1955.

== Notable alumni ==
- Harvey Kuenn, former player and manager, Major League Baseball
- Edgar E. Lien, Wisconsin State Assemblyman
