= Wayland Academy (Wisconsin) =

Coordinates: 43°27′25.0″N 88°49′39.4″W

- Beaver Dam, Wisconsin; United States

Information
- Type: Independent, coeducational boarding/day school
- Motto: Knowledge and Character
- Established: 1855
- Head of School: Jason Warnick
- Faculty: 29 teachers
- Enrollment: 200 students (72% boarding, 28% day)
- Average class size: 13
- Student to teacher ratio: 7:1
- Campus: 55 acres (220,000 m^{2})
- Colors: Red and White
- Athletics: 21 interscholastic sports teams
- Athletics conference: Trailways East, Trailways Small (Football), Capitol, Flyway
- Mascot: Big Red
- Accreditation: ISACS, NCA CASI
- Yearbook: Pillars
- Matriculation Rate: 100% of Wayland Academy seniors are accepted to four-year universities
- Website: wayland.org

Wayland Academy is a selective private, coeducational college preparatory boarding high school located in Beaver Dam, Wisconsin, United States. The student population at the beginning of the 2024–25 school year was 200. Nearly three-quarters of the students board at the school.

== History ==
Wayland Academy was chartered by the legislature of Wisconsin in 1855 as Wayland University, by a group that included S. L. Rose (Beaver Dam's representative to the Wisconsin State Assembly) and other local dignitaries.

Founded as a Baptist academy, it was named for Francis Wayland. The cornerstone of Wayland Hall was laid in 1855, marking the beginning of a new institution aimed at increasing the number of Midwestern students prepared for studying at Baptist seminaries. During the 1860s, it became co-educational.

In fall of 1868, after the end of the American Civil War, Wayland was briefly taken over as an adjunct to the Chicago University, but regained its independence in 1875. During the Great Depression the administration chose to end its historical Baptist affiliation. During the 1960s, it became known as Wayland Junior College. After including a middle school in the 1980s, Wayland became the four-year, college preparatory, boarding/day high school that it is today, serving grades 9–12. It celebrated its sesquicentennial in 2005.

In the summer of 1944 during World War II, Camp Beaver Dam, a POW camp, was constructed on the grounds of what is now the Wayland Academy field house. The POW camp held 300 German prisoners of war in a tent city encampment.

== Campus ==
Wayland Academy's 55-acre (220,000 m^{2}) campus is located near downtown Beaver Dam. It consists of north and south halves divided by Hwy. 33. North Campus, the school's original land, is home to most of the campus buildings. It has separate buildings for different academic faculties, dormitory space, administration, and student life. South Campus, a former fairground, consists of athletic fields and the school's field house.

=== Academic facilities ===
The Academic Building and Swan Library are two of the newest buildings on campus, completed in 1989. The Academic building houses the departments of mathematics, English, history, and modern and classical languages. Swan Library contains a student computer lab in addition to the 21,000 volume collection, including roughly 60 periodicals, and having first issue copies of several major magazines such as National Geographic.

In recent years Kimberly Chapel has served primarily as home to the music department and as a meeting place for the student body. Built in 1958, the chapel is used for weekly assemblies and chapel services, as well as the annual Festival of Lessons and Carols, modeled after the original service at King's College in Cambridge, England. The chapel contains practice rooms and music studios on the lower level, while the chapel proper, with a Steinway Model B piano and a three-manual Moeller pipe organ, often functions as a music performance space.

Discovery Hall was dedicated in 1971 and is home to the science department. In addition to laboratories and classrooms, it contains a lecture hall and an observatory.

=== Residence halls and student life facilities ===
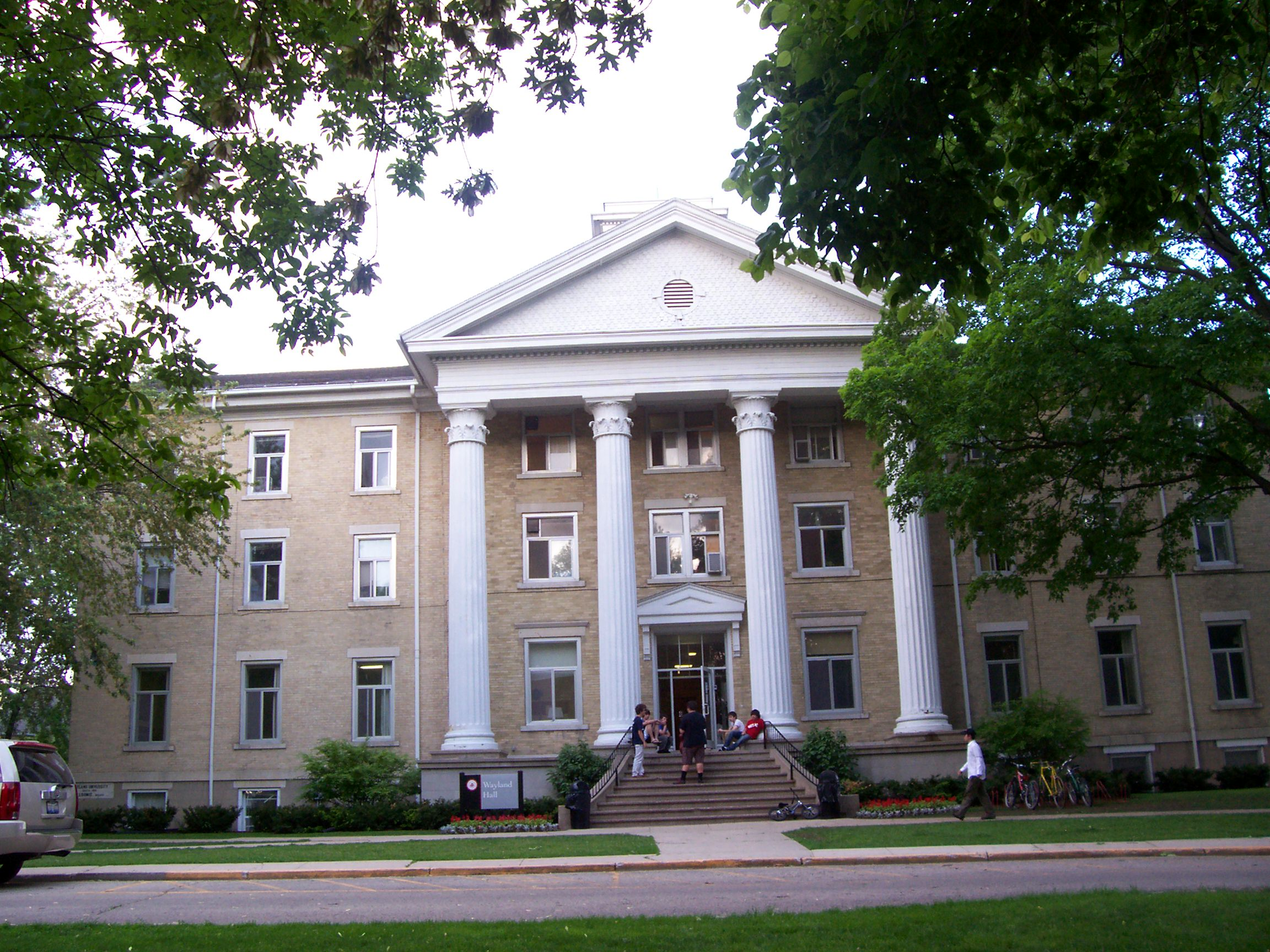
Students on the steps of Wayland Hall

The oldest building on campus is Wayland Hall. Originally constructed in 1855, it was for a time the sole building serving the school, and housed classrooms, bedrooms, a chapel, and a kitchen. It has been remodeled several times, and now serves as a dormitory for first-year and sophomore boys. The building was renovated in 2009, creating a modernized dorm with more comfortable living spaces for its residents. This building remains the school's most recognizable structure due to its four large Corinthian pillars, each of which represents a fundamental element in the Wayland community: Scholarship, Faith, Health, and Service.

Wayland Hall is the first building along the campus's semicircular drive; the second is the Lindsay Gymnasium complex. The original gymnasium dates from 1899 and has since been converted to a student union, dance hall, and art studio. The Sol Wolfe 1934 Memorial Pool and Lindsay Gym are adjacent to the original gym building.

Warren Cottage was originally constructed as a girls' residence hall in 1888. It has received several additions and renovations. It served as a dormitory for first-year and sophomore girls until 2022. Its lower level contains Pickard Dining Hall, a day students' lounge, and the bookstore and post office.

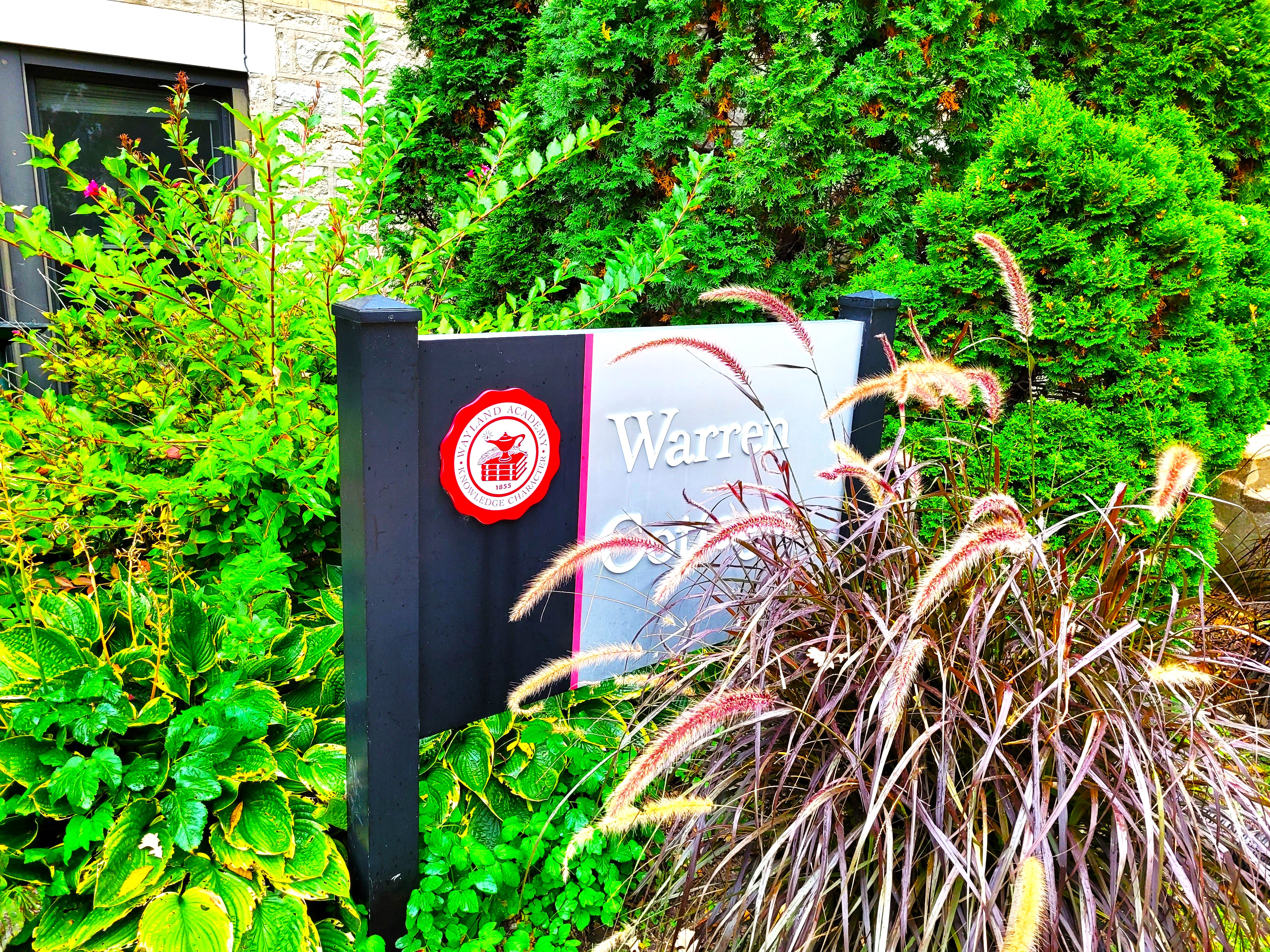
WAYLAND ACADEMY, BEAVER DAM WISCONSIN 11

The twin dormitories, Glen Dye and Ella Dye, opened in the 1960s and house junior and senior students. The men live in Ella Dye and the women in Glen Dye. With the opening of Burnham Hall in 2022, Glen Dye became the home of first-year and sophomore girls. Student rooms are arranged in suite fashion, with two rooms connected by a private bathroom. Both dorms recently underwent extensive interior remodeling and furniture replacement.

Burnham Hall, a residence hall for upper class girls, is the newest building on campus completed in 2022.

Completed in 1901, Roundy Hall was originally a music building and chapel built partially from funds donated by the Roundy family of Roundy's Foods. It now houses administrative offices, including the president's office, the Office of Admissions, the CFO, and the Vice-President of Development.

Other buildings on North Campus include the Head of School's House and Schoen House, the student health center.

The primary building on the 26-acre (110,000 m^{2}) South Campus is the field house, built in 1967. Adjacent to it are the school's eleven tennis courts and athletic fields. An additional field, Brown Field, is located on North Campus and is used for football and field hockey.

== Images ==
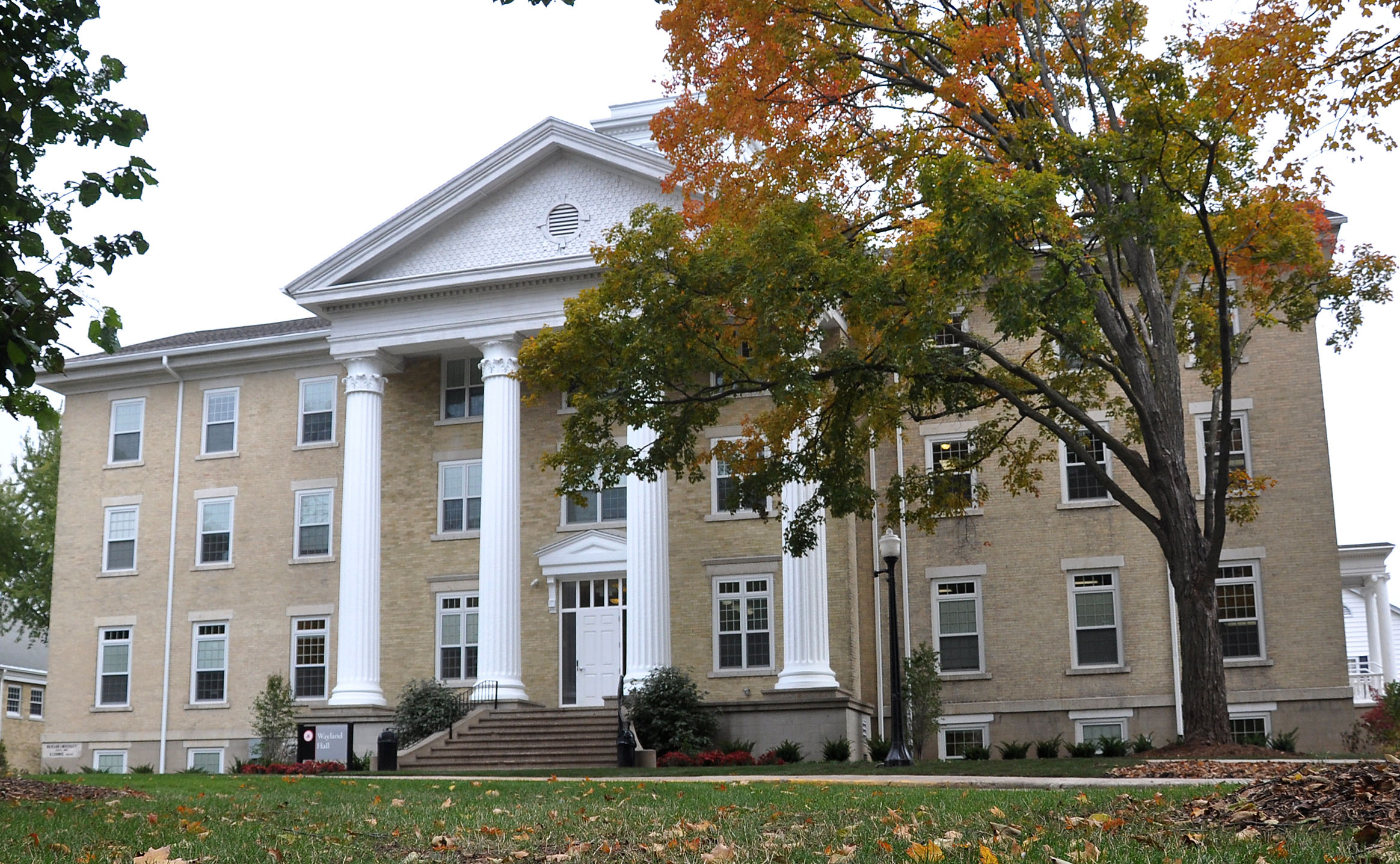
Wayland Hall

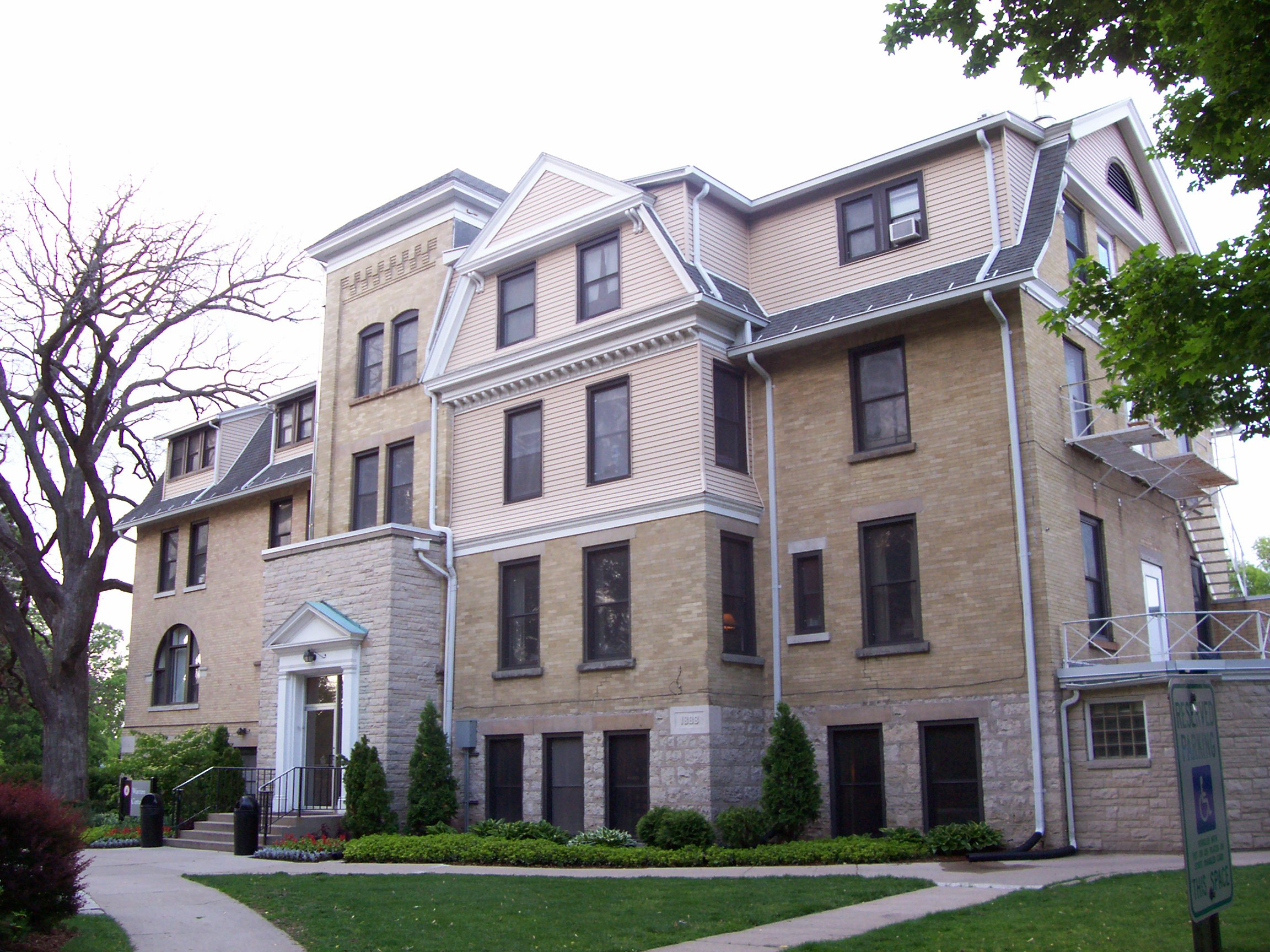
Warren Cottage

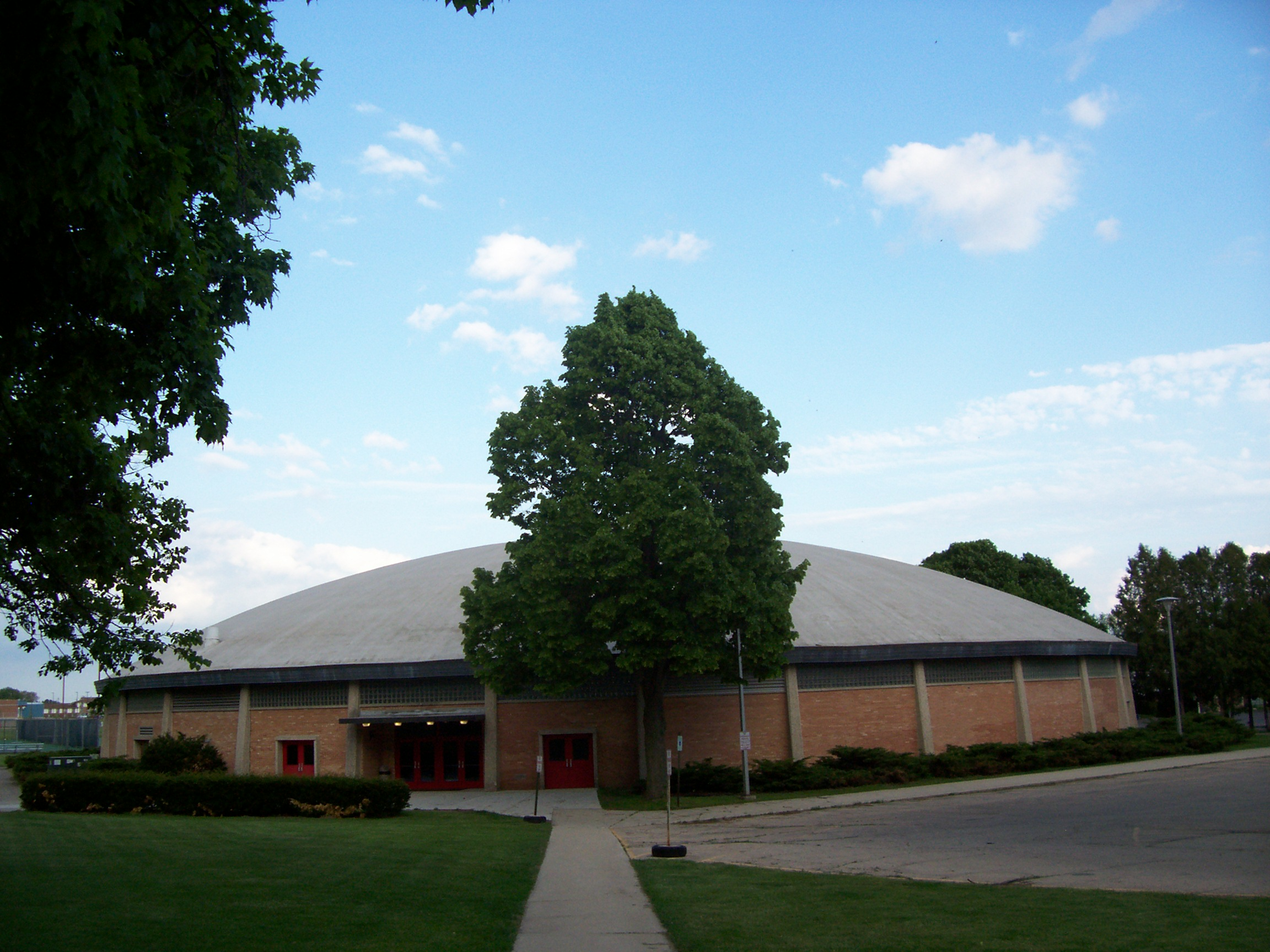
Field House

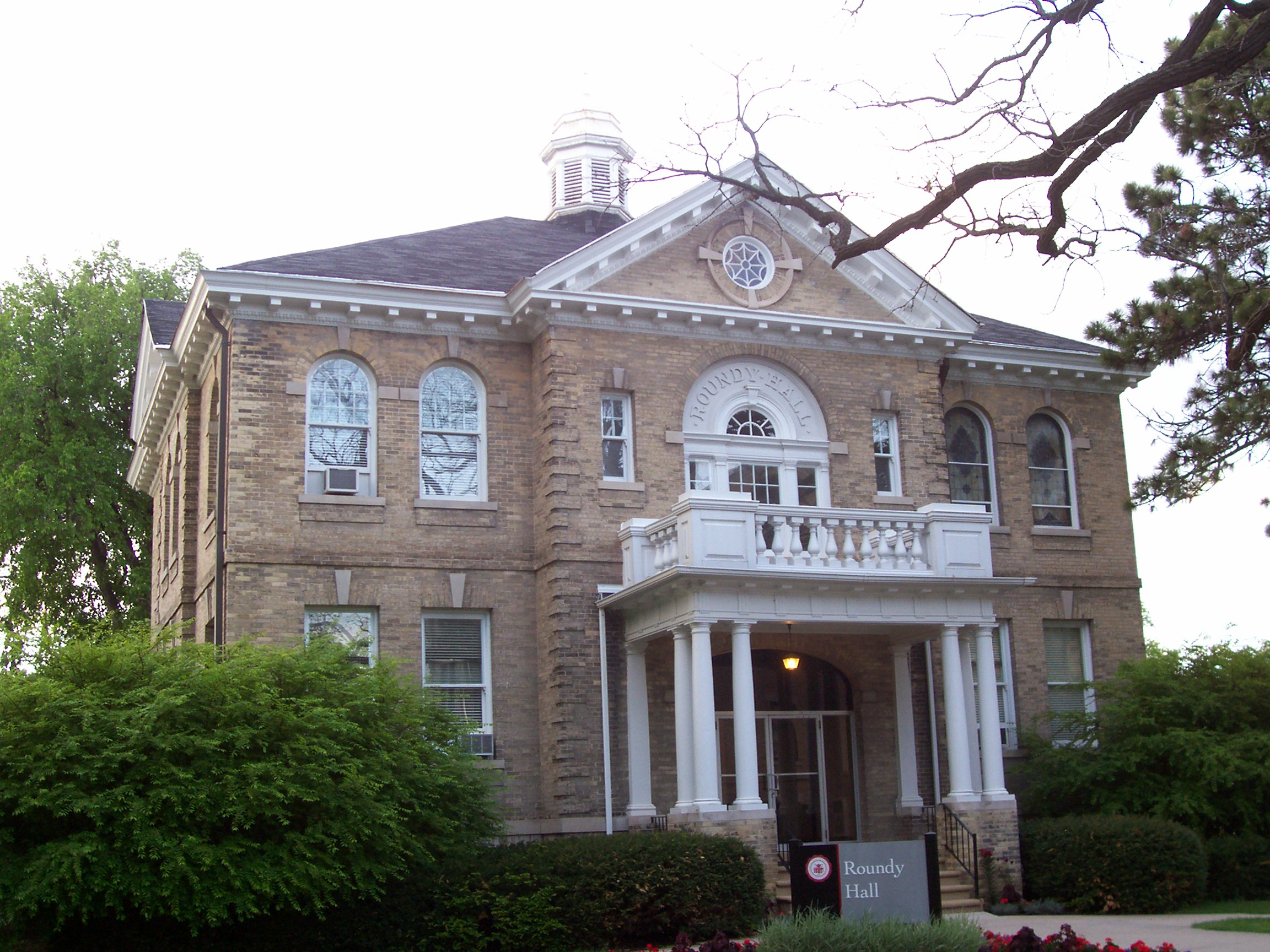
Roundy Hall

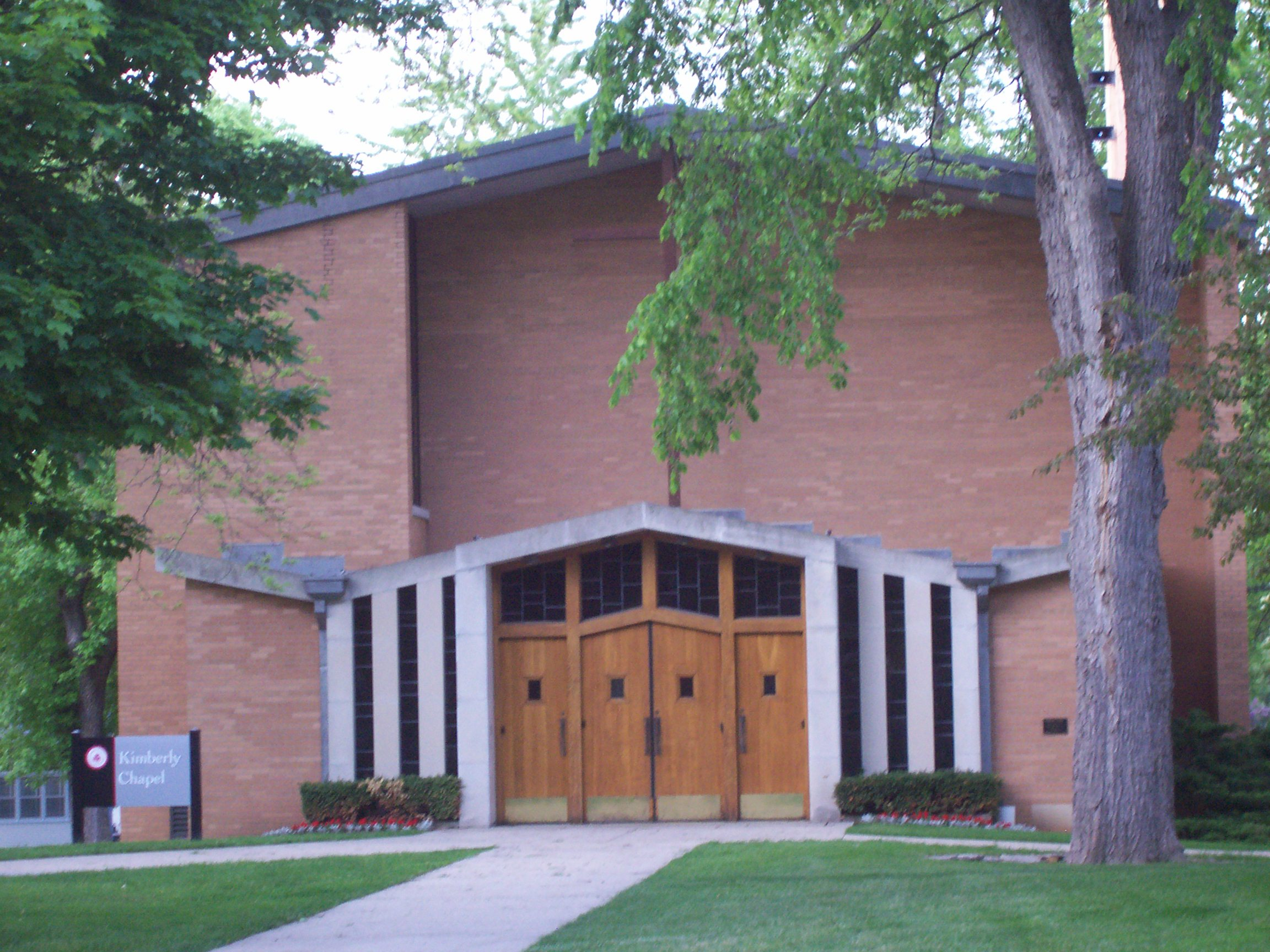
Kimberly Chapel

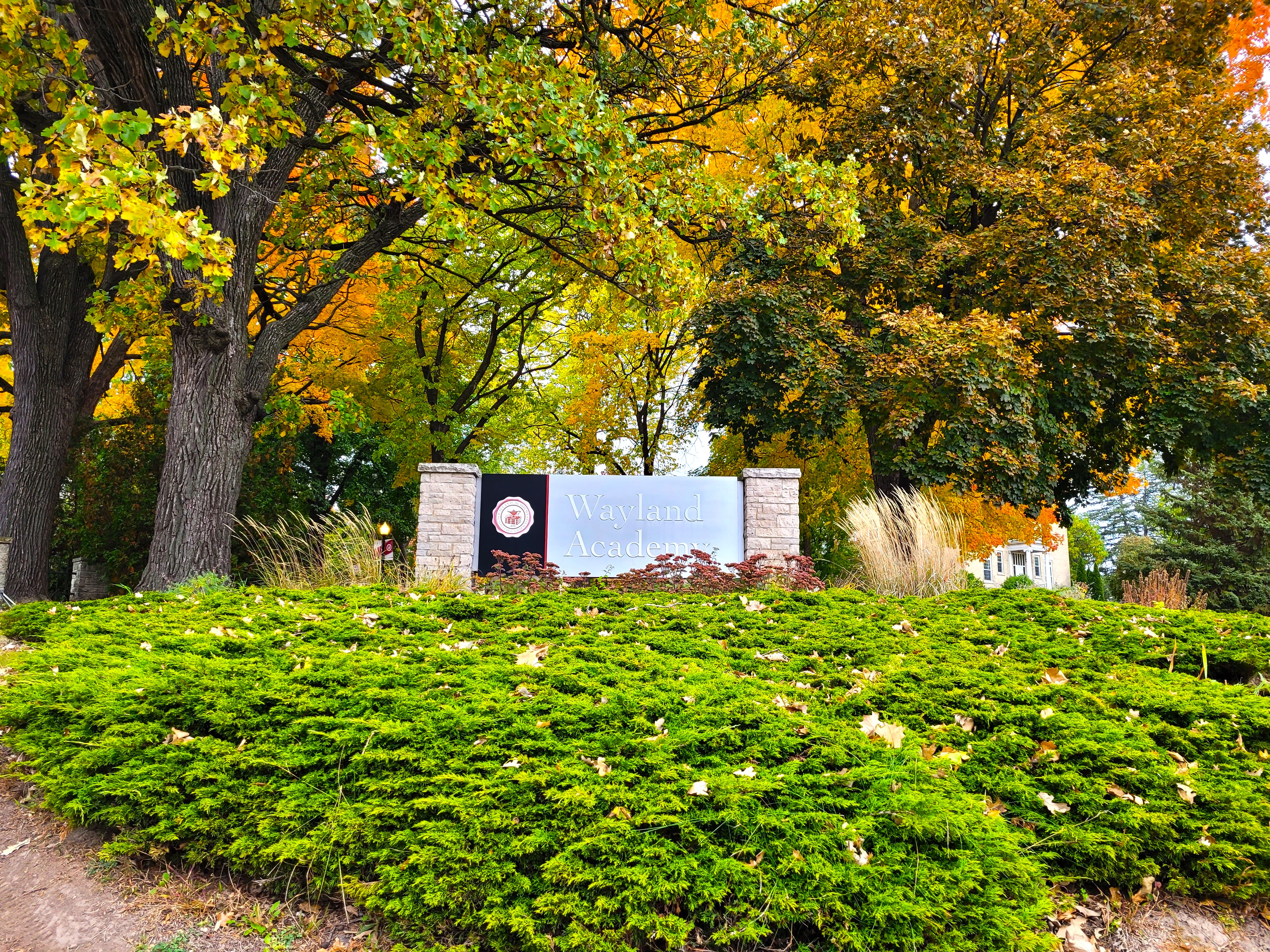

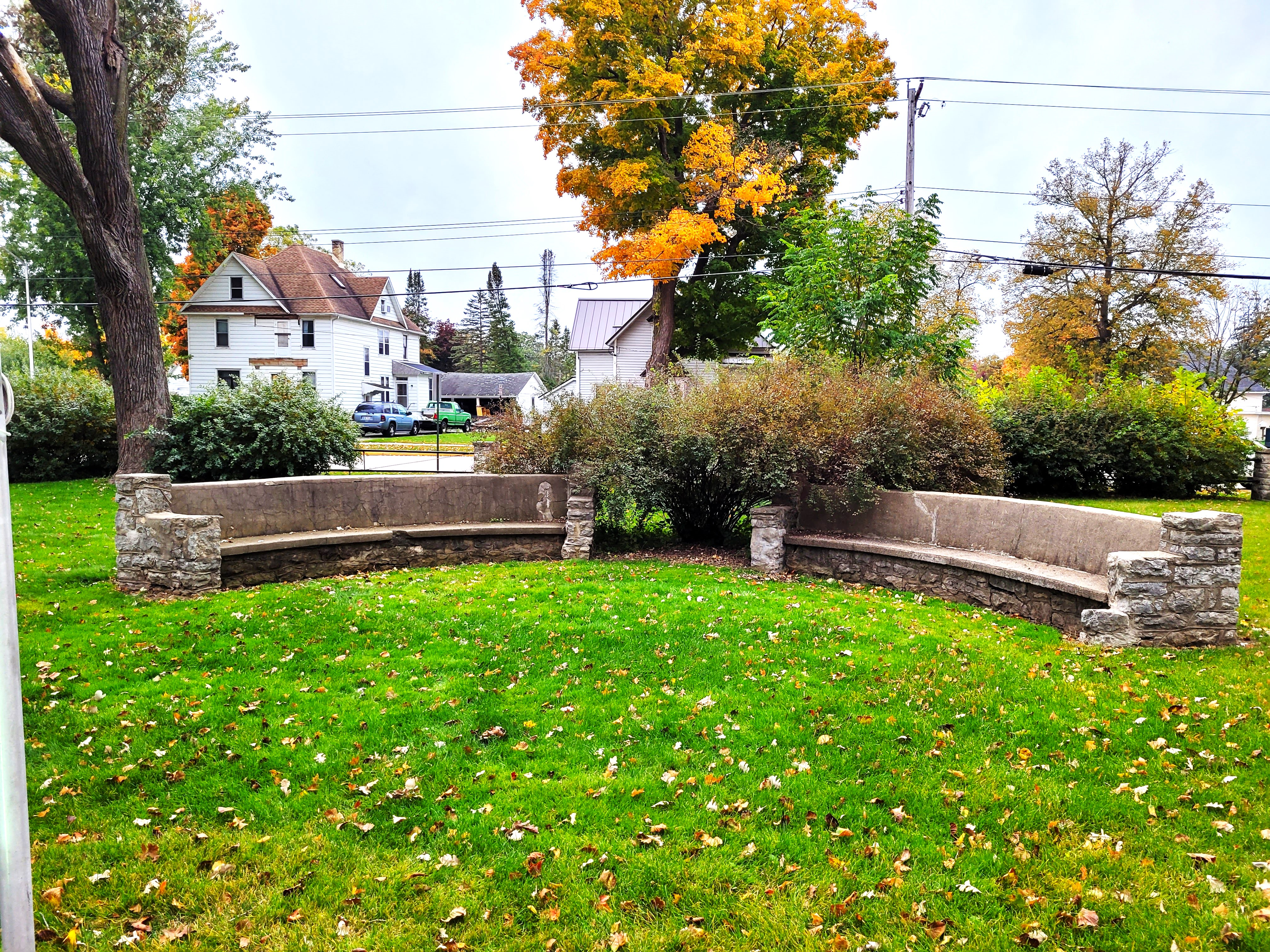

== Academics ==
Wayland's academic program focuses on preparing its students for undergraduate colleges and universities upon graduation. The class schedule consists of eight 45-minute periods whose order rotates daily. Classes are offered on three levels: college preparatory, honors, and advanced placement (AP). Graduation requirements include four years of English, and three years each of mathematics, social science/history, natural sciences, and languages. Languages offered include Spanish and German. Additionally, all students must have at least one year of foreign language instruction to graduate. Students must also complete the equivalent of one year's study of fine arts through music or studio art courses or lessons. The school offers 15 classes at the advanced placement level, and approximately 80% of its faculty have attained advanced degrees in their fields.

In 2015 the school joined the Hybrid Learning Consortium. It creates a globalized learning community offering a diverse variety of online courses to students around the world.

== Student life ==
Roughly 15% of Wayland's student body are students are racial minorities, and roughly 20% of Wayland students are international students.

Wayland's dress code includes dress clothes during the school day and on formal occasions. It was provides its boarding students with 19 meals weekly and traditionally holds formal or family-style meals every few weeks. Students eat at least one meal a week with their faculty mentor, a faculty member who serves as an academic and all-purpose adviser to help students with concerns ranging from homework to social issues.

Extracurricular activities are offered. Organizations include concert band, pep band, Thespian Society, student literary magazine, student government, and more.

=== Traditions ===
- The Victory Bell is a large bell located near the middle of campus. It is rung following athletic victories, the last class period for seniors before graduation, and any other significant cause for celebration.

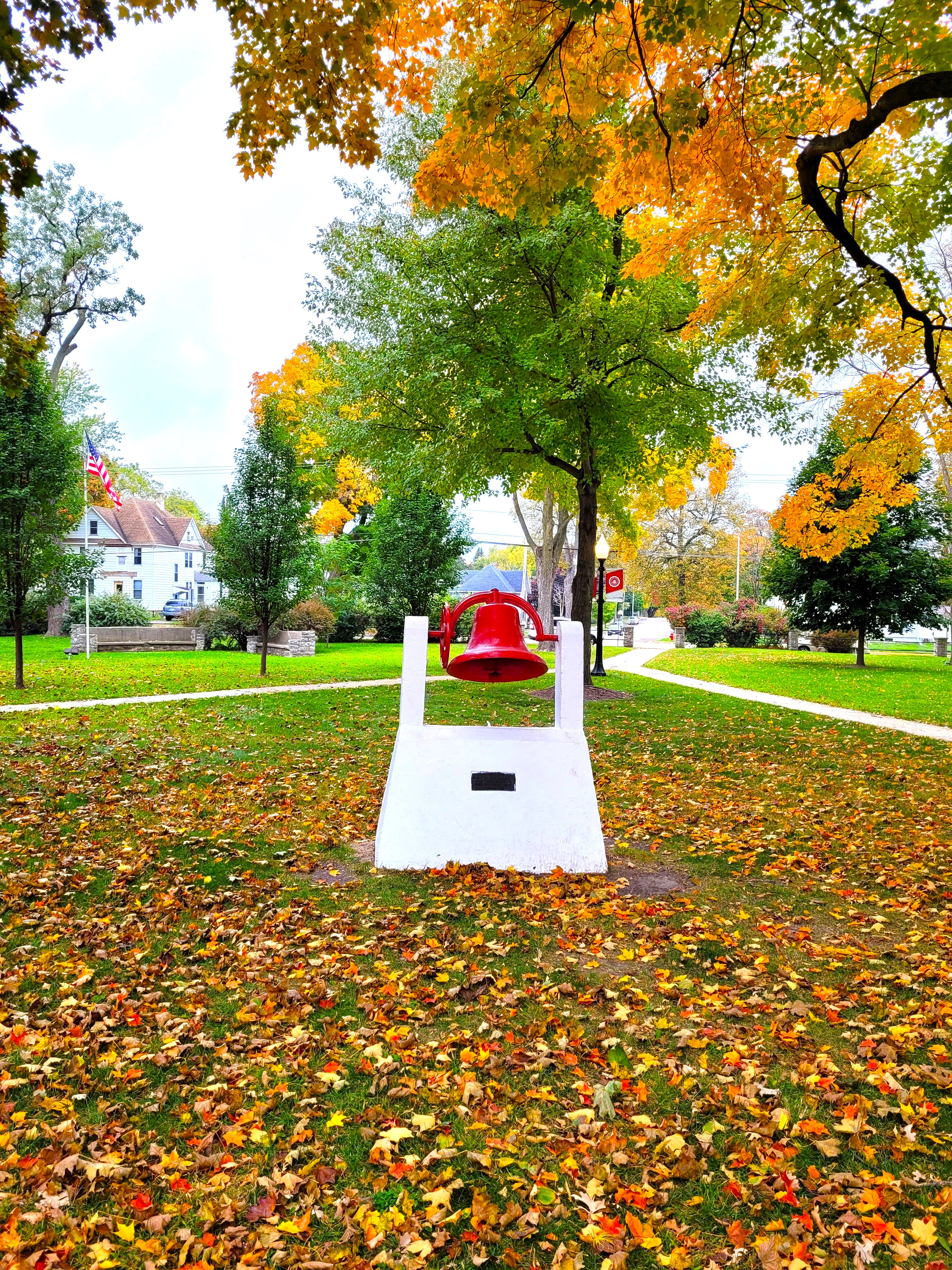
WAYLAND ACADEMY, BEAVER DAM WISCONSIN 19

- The Axe Hunt is an annual event held in late spring, where students from the graduating class hide a wooden axe somewhere on the Wayland campus. The junior students follow clues hidden throughout the city of Beaver Dam to find the axe before a set time. If the juniors find the axe, they receive a week of relaxed dress code.
- Each year the school year has begun with orientation, a weekend of difficult team-work based games and activities. The games are run by returning faculty and students. This event dates back more than fifty years.
- Every year ends with a Senior Chapel, when Senior students sing some, give inspirational speeches, and reflect on their past time at Wayland to the underclassmen.

== Athletics ==
In lieu of physical education courses, all Wayland students participate in extracurricular athletic activities in each season of the year. In addition to offering an alternative activities program, the following team sports are offered:

Fall:

- Football (M)
- Soccer (M)
- Tennis (W)
- Volleyball (W)
- Cross country (M, W)

Winter:

- Basketball (M, W)
- Swimming (M, W)

Spring:

- Baseball (M)
- Golf (M, W)
- Soccer (W)
- Softball (W)
- Tennis (M)
- Track (M, W)

=== Athletic conference affiliation history ===
- Wisconsin Prep Conference (1940-1952)
- Midwest Prep Conference (1952-1964, 1965-1983)
- Midwest Classic Conference (1983-1994)
- Indian Trails Conference (1994-1996)
- Midwest Classic Conference (1994-2014)
- Trailways Conference (2014–present)

== Notable alumni ==
=== Government ===
- Cyrus Amir-Mokri 1982, Assistant Secretary of the Treasury for Financial Institutions
- Claire B. Bird 1886, Wisconsin State Senator
- Michael E. Burke 1884, congressman Dictionary of Wisconsin History
- Jesse Clason 1881, Wisconsin State Representative and physician
- Robert Goetsch 1951, Wisconsin State Representative
- Daniel E. LaBar 1879, Wisconsin State Representative
- George F. Merrill 1867, Wisconsin State Senator
- Charles Pettibone 1859, Wisconsin State Senator
- Ernest B. Price 1908, American diplomat and academic
- George Edwin Taylor 1879, first African American to run for the United States Presidency
- John Mellen Thurston 1867, former U.S. Senator from Nebraska

=== Professional sports ===
- Ric Flair 1968, professional wrestler
- Emerson "Pink" Hawley 1891, professional baseball
- Addie Joss 1891, Baseball Hall of Fame member
- Tom Nissalke 1951, professional basketball coach
- Jimmy Chin 1992, professional climber and mountaineer
- Ned Merriam 1905, member of the U.S. Track and Field Team at the 1908 Summer Olympics (London)

=== Business ===
- Ray Patterson 1940, former General Manager of the Milwaukee Bucks and Houston Rockets
- Frederick D. Underwood 1868, businessman

=== Sciences, media and the arts ===
- Jensen Buchanan 1980, former soap opera star of Another World and General Hospital
- Donald Downs 1967, professor of political science and law at the University of Wisconsin–Madison
- Zona Gale 1891, author and playwright, recipient of the Pulitzer Prize
