= Midwest Prep Conference =

Wisconsin high school athletic conference (1940-1983)

The Midwest Prep Conference is a former high school athletic conference in competition from 1940 to 1983. Consisting entirely of private schools, most were located in Wisconsin and had membership in the Wisconsin Independent Schools Athletic Association.

== History ==
=== 1940–1952 ===
Location of original Wisconsin Prep Conference members

The Midwest Prep Conference began play in 1940 as the Wisconsin Prep Conference with five private high schools in southeastern Wisconsin. Three were located in the Milwaukee area (Lutheran High, Milwaukee Country Day, and Milwaukee University), one in Watertown (Northwestern Prep) and one in Beaver Dam (Wayland Academy). Northwestern Military & Naval Academy in Lake Geneva had a brief stint in the conference from 1945 to 1949, and their entry coincided with the addition of football as a sponsored sport. They were replaced by Racine Lutheran High School in 1950.

=== 1952–1964 ===
Location of Midwest Prep Conference members (1955–1964)

In 1952, the Wisconsin Prep Conference added two schools to bring the membership roster to eight. Both schools were located in Illinois (Lake Forest Academy and North Shore Country Day School in Winnetka). With the addition of Illinois-based schools to the loop came a new name: the Midwest Prep Conference. North Shore Country Day School's tenure in the conference would be brief, as they left in 1954. The next year, Lutheran High School in Milwaukee was split up by the two ecclesiastical organizations running the school. Milwaukee Lutheran High School was opened by the Lutheran Church – Missouri Synod and Wisconsin Lutheran High School was established by the Wisconsin Evangelical Lutheran Synod, both in 1955.

=== 1964-1970 ===
The year 1964 saw numerous changes to Midwest Prep Conference membership with a net loss of two members. Milwaukee Country Day School and Milwaukee University School (along with the all-girls Milwaukee-Downer Seminary) merged to form the University School of Milwaukee. The new school took over both MCDS’'s campus in Whitefish Bay and MUS's River Hills campus, along with both predecessor schools' conference membership. The Midwest Prep also lost Lake Forest Academy and Wayland Academy, becoming a Wisconsin-only conference in the process. The entry of Concordia College Prep in Milwaukee to the conference brought its membership roster to six members. St. John's Military Academy in Delafield applied for membership along with Concordia but was rejected because of scheduling issues. Fox Valley Lutheran High School in Appleton joined the Midwest Prep Conference in 1965 accompanied with Wayland Academy's return to the circuit, bringing the total number of members back up to eight schools. In 1968, seven of the eight member schools of the Midwest Prep Conference joined the Wisconsin Independent Schools Athletic Association, an organization for interscholastic athletics composed entirely of parochial and private schools. Northwestern Prep was the only holdout, not joining WISAA until 1974.

=== 1970–1983 ===
Location of final Midwest Prep Conference members

In 1970, Martin Luther High School in Greendale joined the Midwest Prep Conference, replacing Concordia Prep, which had left the conference to compete as an independent before closing its doors the next year. Fox Valley Lutheran left the Midwest Prep Conference in 1971 to join the Fox Valley Christian Conference, looking to cut down on long travel distances. St. Mary's High School in Burlington, which had been left without conference affiliation when the Southeastern Badger Conference disbanded, replaced Fox Valley Lutheran. The last changes to conference membership occurred in 1974, when Milwaukee Lutheran joined the Metro Conference and Wisconsin Lutheran left for the Wisconsin Little Ten Conference. St. John's Military Academy in Delafield came over from the Classic Conference to replace the two exiting schools, ten years after its initial attempt to gain conference membership. The conference featured the same seven members for the remainder of its existence, with the exception of St. Lawrence Seminary in Mount Calvary joining as an associate member for football in 1981. In 1983 the Midwest Prep Conference joined with nine out of the eleven schools from the Classic Conference (Central Wisconsin Christian, Kettle Moraine Lutheran, Notre Dame, Sheboygan Christian, Sheboygan Lutheran, Shoreland Lutheran, St. Lawrence Seminary, and The Prairie School) and Winnebago Lutheran Academy (which was a member of the Classic Conference in all sports other than it's standing as an Independent in football) to form the Midwest Classic Conference.

== Conference membership history ==
=== Final members ===
School	Location	Affiliation	Mascot	Colors	Joined	Left	Conference Joined	Current Conference
Martin Luther	Greendale, WI	Private (LCMS)	Spartans		1970	1983	Midwest Classic	Metro Classic
Northwestern Prep	Watertown, WI	Private (WELS)	Hornets		1940	1983	Midwest Classic	Closed in 1995 (merged with Martin Luther Prep)
Racine Lutheran	Racine, WI	Private (LCMS)	Crusaders		1950	1983	Midwest Classic	Metro Classic
St. John's Military Academy	Delafield, WI	Private (Nonsectarian), Military	Lancers		1974	1983	Midwest Classic	
St. Mary’s	Burlington, WI	Private (Catholic)	Hilltoppers		1971	1983	Midwest Classic	
University School of Milwaukee	River Hills, WI	Private (Nonsectarian)	Wildcats		1964	1983	Midwest Classic	
Wayland Academy	Beaver Dam, WI	Private (historically Baptist)	Big Red		1940, 1965	1964, 1983	Independent, Midwest Classic	Trailways

=== Previous members ===
School	Location	Affiliation	Mascot	Colors	Joined	Left	Conference Joined	Current Conference
Concordia Prep	Milwaukee, WI	Private (LCMS)	Falcons		1964	1970	Independent	Closed in 1971
Fox Valley Lutheran	Appleton, WI	Private (WELS)	Foxes		1965	1971	Fox Valley Christian	Bay (2025)
Lake Forest Academy	Lake Forest, IL	Private (Nonsectarian)	Caxys		1952	1964	Private School League (IHSA)	Independent School League (IHSA)
Lutheran High	Milwaukee, WI	Private (LCMS & WELS)	Knights		1940	1955	Closed (split into Milwaukee Lutheran and Wisconsin Lutheran)	
Milwaukee Country Day	Whitefish Bay, WI	Private (Nonsectarian)	Cougars		1940	1964	Closed (merged into University School of Milwaukee)	
Milwaukee Lutheran	Milwaukee, WI	Private (LCMS)	Red Knights		1955	1974	Metro	Woodland
Milwaukee University	River Hills, WI	Private (Nonsectarian)	Lancers		1940	1964	Closed (merged into University School of Milwaukee)	
North Shore Country Day	Winnetka, IL	Private (Nonsectarian)	Raiders		1952	1954	Private School League (IHSA)	Independent School League (IHSA)
Northwestern Military & Naval Academy	Lake Geneva, WI	Private (Nonsectarian), Military	Falcons		1945	1949	Independent	Closed in 1995 (merged with St. John's Military Academy)
Wisconsin Lutheran	Milwaukee, WI	Private (WELS)	Vikings		1955	1974	Wisconsin Little Ten	Woodland

=== Football-only members ===
School	Location	Affiliation	Mascot	Colors	Seasons	Primary Conference
St. Lawrence Seminary	Mount Calvary, WI	Private (Catholic)	Hilltoppers		1981-1982	Classic

== List of state champions ==
=== Fall sports ===
Boys Cross Country
School	Year	Organization	Division
University School	1975	WISAA	Class C
University School	1976	WISAA	Class C
University School	1977	WISAA	Class C
University School	1982	WISAA	Class C

Football
School	Year	Organization	Division
St. Mary’s	1976	WISAA	Class B
St. Mary’s	1977	WISAA	Class B
St. Mary’s	1978	WISAA	Class B
Northwestern Prep	1980	WISAA	Class B
St. Mary’s	1981	WISAA	Class B

Boys Soccer
School	Year	Organization
University School	1975	WISAA

Girls Tennis
School	Year	Organization
University School	1976	WISAA
University School	1977	WISAA
University School	1978	WISAA
University School	1982	WISAA

=== Winter sports ===
Boys Basketball
School	Year	Organization	Division
Racine Lutheran	1975	WISAA	Class B

Girls Basketball
School	Year	Organization	Division
Northwestern Prep	1979	WISAA	Class B

=== Spring sports ===
Boys Golf
School	Year	Organization
Milwaukee Lutheran	1969	WISAA

Boys Tennis
School	Year	Organization
University School	1969	WISAA
University School	1971	WISAA
University School	1972	WISAA
University School	1973	WISAA
University School	1974	WISAA
University School	1975	WISAA
University School	1976	WISAA
University School	1978	WISAA
University School	1979	WISAA
University School	1980	WISAA

Boys Track & Field
School	Year	Organization	Division
Wayland Academy	1969	WISAA	Class C
University School	1970	WISAA	Class C
University School	1971	WISAA	Class C
University School	1972	WISAA	Class C
University School	1975	WISAA	Class C
University School	1976	WISAA	Class C
St. John’s Military Academy	1977	WISAA	Class C
University School	1978	WISAA	Class C
University School	1979	WISAA	Class C
Racine Lutheran	1980	WISAA	Class C
Racine Lutheran	1981	WISAA	Class C
Racine Lutheran	1982	WISAA	Class C
Wayland Academy	1983	WISAA	Class C

Girls Track & Field
School	Year	Organization
Wisconsin Lutheran	1972	WISAA
Wisconsin Lutheran	1973	WISAA

== List of conference champions ==
=== Boys Basketball ===
School	Quantity	Years
Milwaukee University	8	1947, 1948, 1950, 1951, 1958, 1959, 1960, 1961
Racine Lutheran	8	1951, 1953, 1954, 1956, 1957, 1972, 1982, 1983
Lutheran High	6	1947, 1948, 1949, 1951, 1952, 1955
Milwaukee Lutheran	6	1962, 1963, 1964, 1967, 1970, 1972
Wisconsin Lutheran	6	1964, 1965, 1966, 1968, 1971, 1973
St. John’s Military Academy	5	1976, 1977, 1978, 1979, 1980
Wayland Academy	5	1942, 1947, 1957, 1969, 1970
Lake Forest Academy	3	1955, 1957, 1958
Martin Luther	2	1974, 1975
Northwestern Prep	2	1941, 1981
University School	2	1974, 1975
Milwaukee Country Day	1	1946
St. Mary’s	1	1976
Concordia Prep	0	
Fox Valley Lutheran	0	
North Shore Country Day	0	
Northwestern Military & Naval Academy	0	

=== Girls Basketball ===
School	Quantity	Years
Northwestern Prep	6	1978, 1979, 1980, 1981, 1982, 1983
Racine Lutheran	2	1980, 1981
St. Mary’s	1	1983
Martin Luther	0	
University School	0	
Wayland Academy	0	

=== Football ===
School	Quantity	Years
Milwaukee Country Day	15	1945, 1946, 1947, 1948, 1949, 1950, 1951, 1952, 1954, 1955, 1958, 1959, 1960, 1961, 1963
St. Mary’s	5	1975, 1976, 1977, 1978, 1981
University School	5	1964, 1965, 1970, 1974, 1978
Milwaukee Lutheran	4	1962, 1966, 1967, 1969
Wayland Academy	4	1945, 1946, 1954, 1956
Martin Luther	3	1972, 1973, 1980
Milwaukee University	3	1957, 1960, 1961
Wisconsin Lutheran	3	1968, 1971, 1972
St. John’s Military Academy	2	1978, 1982
Lake Forest Academy	1	1953
Lutheran High	1	1948
Concordia Prep	0	
Fox Valley Lutheran	0	
North Shore Country Day	0	
Northwestern Military & Naval Academy	0	
Northwestern Prep	0	
Racine Lutheran	0	
St. Lawrence Seminary	0	
