= Kevin Zeitler =

American football player (born 1990)

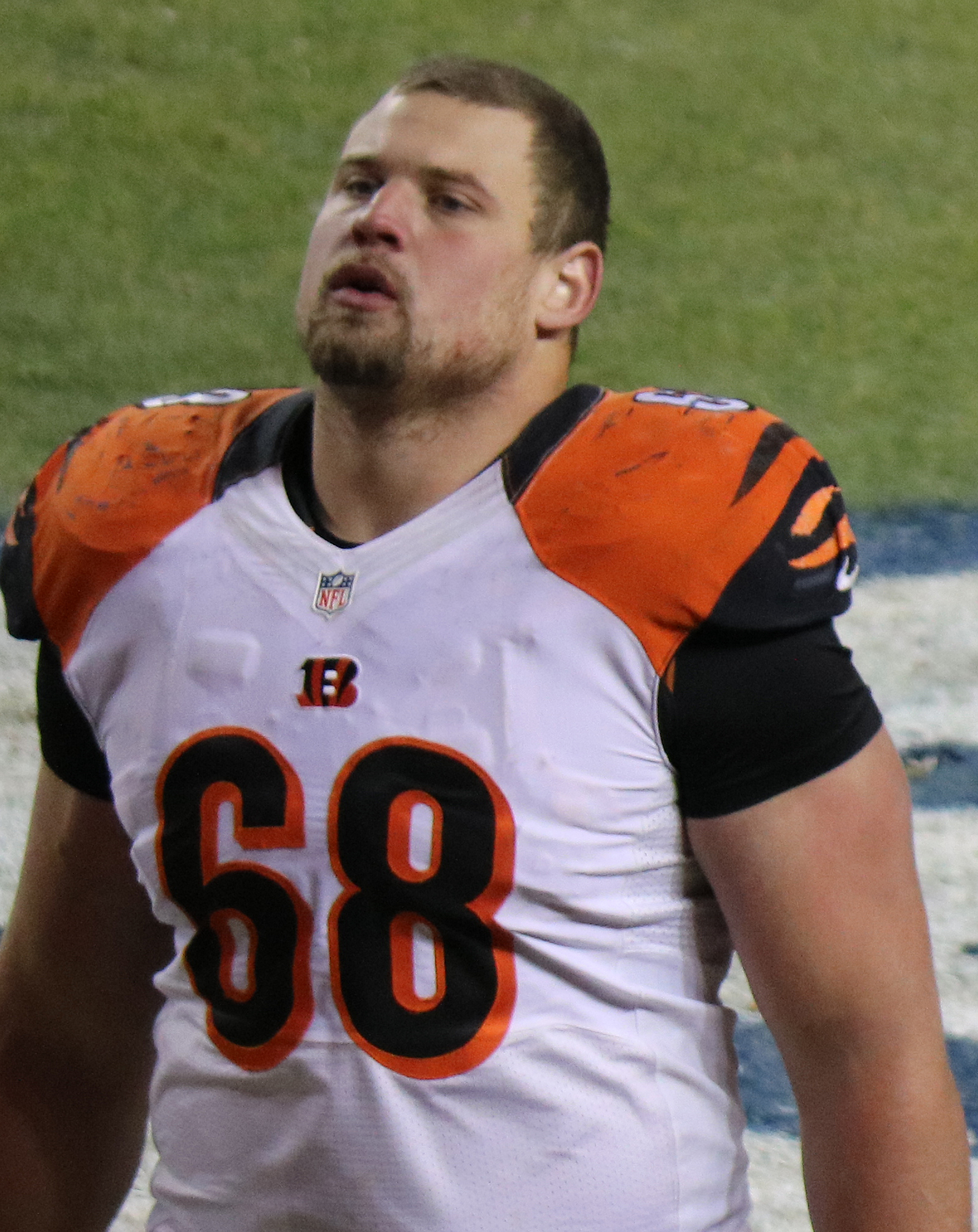
- Zeitler with the Cincinnati Bengals in 2015

No. 70 – Green Bay Packers
- Position: Guard
- Roster status: Active

Personal information
- Born: March 8, 1990 (age 36); Waukesha, Wisconsin, U.S.
- Listed height: 6 ft 4 in (1.93 m)
- Listed weight: 314 lb (142 kg)

Career information
- High school: Wisconsin Lutheran (Milwaukee, Wisconsin)
- College: Wisconsin (2008–2011)
- NFL draft: 2012: 1st round, 27th overall pick

Career history
- Cincinnati Bengals (2012–2016); Cleveland Browns (2017–2018); New York Giants (2019–2020); Baltimore Ravens (2021–2023); Detroit Lions (2024); Tennessee Titans (2025); Green Bay Packers (2026–present)

Awards and highlights
- Pro Bowl (2023); PFWA All-Rookie Team (2012); Consensus All-American (2011); First-team All-Big Ten (2011)

Career NFL statistics as of Week 10, 2026
- Games played: 218
- Games started: 213
- Stats at Pro Football Reference

Kevin Zeitler (/ˈzaɪtlər/ ZYTE-lər; born March 8, 1990) is an American professional football guard for the Green Bay Packers of the National Football League (NFL). He played college football for the Wisconsin Badgers, and earned consensus All-American honors. He was selected by the Cincinnati Bengals in the first round of the 2012 NFL draft and he has also played for the Cleveland Browns, New York Giants, Baltimore Ravens, Detroit Lions and Tennessee Titans.

== Early life ==
Zeitler was born in Waukesha, Wisconsin. He attended Wisconsin Lutheran High School in Milwaukee, Wisconsin, and played for Wisconsin Lutheran Vikings high school football team. A three-year letterwinner in football, Zeitler was honored first-team all-conference, first-team all region and second-team all-area as a junior. In his senior year, he gathered first-team all-conference, conference lineman of the year, first-team all region, and first-team all-area honors.

Regarded as a three-star recruit by Rivals.com, Zeitler was ranked the No. 39 offensive guard prospect in his class. Coincidentally, the No. 1 offensive guard in this class was Trevor Robinson, who would later play alongside Zeitler for the Cincinnati Bengals. Having numerous offers, Zeitler narrowed his decision down to Wisconsin and Michigan, before eventually picking the Badgers.

== College career ==
Zeitler attended the University of Wisconsin-Madison, and played for the Wisconsin Badgers football team from 2008 to 2011. He was recognized as a consensus first-team All-American, having been named to the first-teams of the American Football Coaches Association (AFCA), the Associated Press and Pro Football Weekly as a senior in 2011. Zeitler joined teammates Montee Ball and Peter Konz as AFCA All-Americans.

== Professional career ==
=== Pre-draft ===
Even though "not a nifty or nimble lineman", Zeitler was described as "a solid prospect with the ability to be used in a power running offense". Projected to be a second round selection, Zeitler was ranked No. 4 among guards available in the 2012 NFL draft by Sports Illustrated.

Pre-draft measurables
Height	Weight	Arm length	Hand span	Wingspan	40-yard dash	10-yard split	20-yard split	20-yard shuttle	Three-cone drill	Vertical jump	Broad jump	Bench press
6 ft 3 7/8 in (1.93 m)	314 lb (142 kg)	32 3/4 in (0.83 m)	10 1/4 in (0.26 m)	6 ft 8 1/2 in (2.04 m)	5.39 s	1.81 s	3.09 s	4.61 s	7.77 s	29 in (0.74 m)	8 ft 5 in (2.57 m)	32 reps
All values from NFL Combine

=== Cincinnati Bengals ===
Zeitler expected to be a second-rounder, having scheduled a draft-party for Day 2 of the Draft, before being surprised by the Cincinnati Bengals' late first-round selection. Zeitler was the eighth UW offensive lineman taken in the first round of an NFL draft since 1976, after Dennis Lick, Ray Snell, Paul Gruber, Aaron Gibson, Chris McIntosh, Joe Thomas, and Gabe Carimi.

In his rookie season, Zeitler started all 16 games at right guard for the Bengals. He gave up only four sacks all season, and graded highest among Bengals linemen. He was named to the PFWA All-Rookie Team.

In his five seasons with the Bengals, Zeitler started 71 of 72 games played at right guard.

=== Cleveland Browns ===
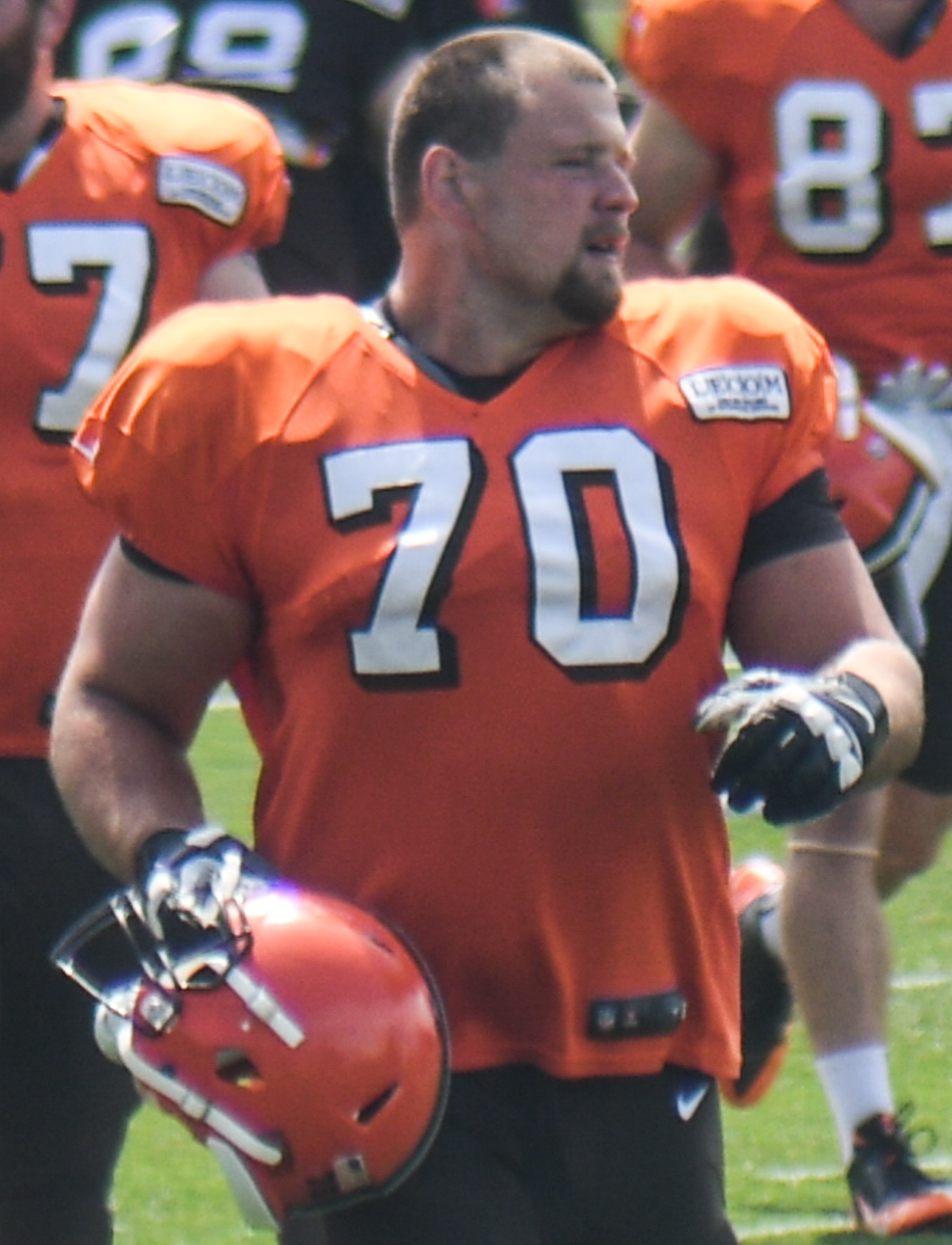
Zeitler with the Browns in 2017

On March 9, 2017, Zeitler signed a five-year, $60 million contract with the Cleveland Browns, making him the highest paid guard in the NFL. He started all 32 games and played every offensive snap during his two seasons with the Browns.

=== New York Giants ===
On March 13, 2019, the Browns traded Zeitler and Jabrill Peppers to the New York Giants, along with their first and third-round (originally acquired from the New England Patriots) picks in the 2019 NFL draft, in exchange for Odell Beckham Jr. and Olivier Vernon. He appeared in and started 31 games during the 2019 and 2020 seasons.

On March 10, 2021, the Giants released Zeitler.

=== Baltimore Ravens ===
Zeitler signed a three-year $22.5 million contract with the Baltimore Ravens on March 18, 2021. In the 2021 season, he started in all 17 games.

In the 2022 season, Zeitler appeared in and started 15 games.

In the 2023 season, Zeitler appeared in and started 15 games. He had a fumble recovery in Week 1 against the Texans. On January 30, 2024, Zeitler was named to the Pro Bowl for the first time in his career as an alternate, replacing Joe Thuney of the Kansas City Chiefs.

=== Detroit Lions ===
On March 19, 2024, Zeitler signed with the Detroit Lions. During the 2024 season, he appeared in and started 16 games at right guard, and made two fumble recoveries.

=== Tennessee Titans ===
On March 13, 2025, Zeitler signed with the Tennessee Titans on a one-year, $9 million contract. He was named the starting right guard, starting 16 games in 2025.

=== Green Bay Packers ===
On September 30, 2026, Zeitler signed a one-year deal with the Green Bay Packers.

=== NFL career statistics ===
Year	Team	GP	GS
2012	CIN	16	16
2013	CIN	12	11
2014	CIN	12	12
2015	CIN	16	16
2016	CIN	16	16
2017	CLE	16	16
2018	CLE	16	16
2019	NYG	15	15
2020	NYG	16	16
2021	BAL	17	17
2022	BAL	15	15
2023	BAL	15	15
2024	DET	16	16
2025	TEN	16	16
2026	GNB	4	0
Career		218	213
