= Wisconsin Lutheran High School =

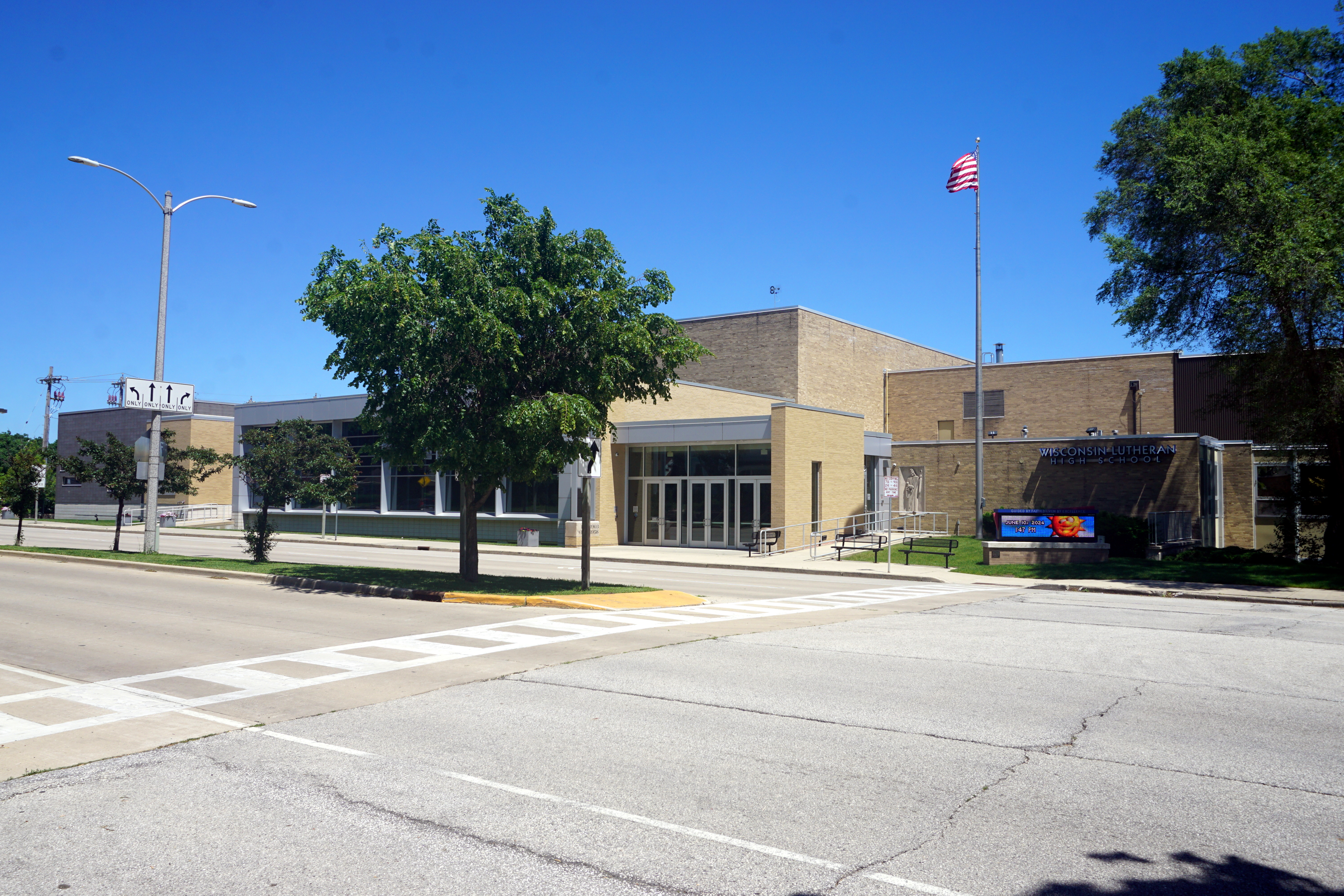

Location
- 330 N. Glenview Ave. Milwaukee, Wisconsin 53213-3379; United States; 43°02′04.0″N 88°00′55.3″W

Information
- Type: Private, college preparatory
- Religious affiliation: Lutheran
- Denomination: Wisconsin Evangelical Lutheran Synod
- Established: 1903
- President: Kenneth Fisher
- Principal: Landon Zacharyasz
- Faculty: 77
- Grades: 9–12
- Gender: Co-educational
- Age: 14 to 18
- Enrollment: 924
- Campus type: Suburban
- Colors: Royal Blue, White, and Red
- Song: Lutheran High School (Minnesota Rouser)
- Athletics conference: Woodland Conference-West Division
- Mascot: Viking
- Nickname: Vikings
- Newspaper: Pilot
- Yearbook: Compass
- Tuition: International students: $47,100 (2025-26)
- Website: www.wlhs.org

Wisconsin Lutheran High School, commonly referred to as WLHS or Wisco, is a private preparatory religious high school in Milwaukee, Wisconsin, United States. WLHS was formed when the Lutheran High School in Milwaukee, founded in 1903, split in the 1950s over doctrinal differences. Both resulting schools (WLHS and Milwaukee Lutheran High School) use the 1903 founding date and are thus the oldest Lutheran high schools in the United States. WLHS is owned and operated by a group of Wisconsin Evangelical Lutheran Synod (WELS) congregations in the Milwaukee area.

== History ==
In 1903, a group of Lutheran pastors, teachers, and laymen from congregations affiliated with the Wisconsin and Missouri synods started a high school in an unused classroom of Immanuel Lutheran School in Milwaukee with 18 students.) In 1904, it relocated to the former site of the Wisconsin Synod's seminary at 13th and Vine streets. Enrollment increased to 340 in 1929 and led to construction of additional buildings at the site. The Great Depression caused enrollment to decline to 265 in 1938, but with the end of the depression, enrollment steadily increased to 848 in 1948. Plans were initiated to build a larger school at a new site, but doctrinal differences between the two synods resulted in the decision for each synod to build its own separate high school and dissolve the joint operation. The Missouri Synod congregations opened Milwaukee Lutheran High School in September 1955, marking the end of the joint operation of the school. The Wisconsin Synod congregations continued to use the old campus for their school until their new building opened in September 1959.

The Wisconsin Synod congregations formed "The Wisconsin Lutheran High School Convention" in 1952. The convention conducted a study that found that 60% of Wisconsin Synod members lived north of the Menomonee Valley and 40% lived south of it. This meant that either one high school in the middle of the city or both north and south high schools would be needed. Accepting a donation of acreage north of Capitol Drive at about 100th Street would have required the latter option, so the offer was rejected and the convention looked for land in the middle of the city.

Land in Wauwatosa on 76th Street just north of Wisconsin Avenue was purchased, but the city of Wauwatosa subsequently changed the zoning and would not issue the permit for construction even though the convention already held one. Legal challenges going all the way to the U.S. Supreme Court ended with Wauwatosa's position being upheld. A local developer was interested in the 76th Street property for an upscale subdivision. He also owned 13 acres (5.3 ha) on Glenview Drive near Blue Mound Road that he intended to use for apartments. After negotiations, the convention and the developer swapped properties. The Wisconsin Lutheran High School facility, including equipment, cost $2.25 million and was dedicated on September 21, 1959. Until then the convention rented the old Lutheran High School facility after the departure of the Missouri Synod contingent. The old high school was subsequently sold to the city of Milwaukee, who built a fire station there, and the proceeds were divided equally between the two groups.

In 1964, the student body raised $40,000 to install a new Schlicker organ in the school's auditorium. That same year, 13 classrooms were added at a cost of $250,000 to be able to handle the school's originally planned capacity of 1,000 students. The Wisconsin Synod's Milwaukee Lutheran Teachers College used a portion of the building for about ten years. Planning for another addition to handle increased enrollment began in the early 1970s and the $1.5 million cost was paid off by 1989. Another wing housing 12 math and science classrooms, a greenhouse, office areas, a fitness center, and a multi-purpose room was dedicated on April 4, 1998. The $3 million project included remodeling and renovation of the existing building.

== Curriculum ==
Wisconsin Lutheran High School offers more than 145 courses. The curriculum includes Advanced Placement courses, dual enrollment college credit courses, and Project Lead the Way (a high-level engineering curriculum). Additionally, WLHS has a youth apprenticeship program to give work experiences to students interested in such areas as a possible future career. There is also a Student Success Center for students needing academic support.

WLHS has attained accreditation at the exemplary level through Wisconsin Evangelical Lutheran Synod School Accreditation (WELSSA), the Wisconsin Religious and Independent School Association (WRISA), and the National Council for Private School Accreditation (NCPSA).

== Student life ==
WLHS offers 60+ sports, clubs, and organizations for student involvement. Students report that their favorite school events include sports, Veterans Day, mission trips, Our Hands for His Service (a year-long service project), Mr. Wisco, dress-up days, the spring musical production, and pep rallies.

Students are required to attend a chapel service for 20 minutes each day. The school offers an assembly once each quarter to address relevant topics within the student body, such as mental health, social media, relationships, and more. At school dances, students are permitted only to bring a date of the opposite gender. WLHS does not allow pregnant students to appear in any "school-related activities where the general public is present". While pregnant students are permitted to participate in their senior graduation service, the administration reserves the right to restrict participation if the student "exhibits an unrepentant or rebellious attitude at some time during the pregnancy or if the student's physical well-being may be at risk", according to the handbook. Restrictions for male students who caused pregnancy are not stated in the handbook.

== PAVE ==
Wisconsin Lutheran High School is a PAVE school. PAVE is an independent, non-profit foundation funded through corporate, foundation and individual support. It aims to give low-income families in Milwaukee options when selecting schools for their children.

== Athletics ==
Students have the opportunity to compete in 18 varsity sports teams as part of the Wisconsin Interscholastic Athletic Association (WIAA) Woodland West Conference. As of 2024, the school holds 39 state champion titles.

WLHS won Division III State Football Championships in 1998, 2004, 2005, 2007, and 2014. It was runner up in 1993, 1999, 2003, and 2011.

The school won Division II State Basketball Championships in 2009, 2014, and 2024. The team was moved to Division 1 in the 2024-25 school year and went on to win the WIAA Division 1 State Basketball Championship. This was the first time in state history that a team won State titles back to back years in two different divisions.

The WLHS boys cross country team has won the Division 2 State Championship three times: in 2011, 2013, and 2014. The girls cross country team won the state championship in 1999.

The girls track and field team took home state champion titles in 1973, 1998, and 2019. The boys track and field team holds 4 state titles: 1987, 1993, 1994, and 1997.

The high school's cheerleading program has won nine state championships (1996, 1997, 2001, 2002, 2004, 2006, 2008, 2009, 2010, 2012, and 2015) and made it to finals at the National High School Cheerleading Competition in Orlando, Florida, in 2009. They reached sixth place at the competition. WLHS was also a national finalist in 2011 and 2015.

WLHS holds additional state champion titles in baseball, golf, wrestling, softball, volleyball, and girls basketball.

=== Conference affiliation history ===
- Midwest Prep Conference (1955-1974)
- Wisconsin Little Ten Conference (1974-2017)
- Woodland Conference (2017–present)

== Extracurricular activities ==
- 18 Varsity sports teams
- Student Council
- National Honor Society
- Future Business Leaders of America
- Global Leadership Team
- American mentors to international students
- Viking Christian Leaders Academy
- Wisco Witnesses in the World
- Mission trips
- Kindness Crew
- Mental health groups (including Hope Squad)
- Culture Club
- Language Learners Club
- Sign Language Club
- Art Club
- Forensics
- Drama Club
- Fall drama production
- One-act competition
- International Thespian Society Troupe 11892
- Spring musical production
- Instrumental and vocal ensembles
- Jubilation Handbell Choir
- Page Turners Book Club
- Compass (yearbook)
- Pilot (school newspaper)
- Tech Team
- Esports
- Canoe Club
- Rock Climbing Club
- Ski & Snowboarding Club
- Trap Shooting Club
- Fashion Club
- Food Club
- Aquaponics
- FTC Robotics Team 265
- Chess Club

== Notable alumni ==
- David Craig, politician, class of 1997
- Chris Garrett, National Football League (NFL) linebacker, Los Angeles Rams, class of 2017
- Kon Knueppel, college basketball player for Duke Blue Devils and National Basketball Association (NBA) Guard, Charlotte Hornets , class of 2024
- Greg Mahlberg, professional baseball player, class of 1969
- Sam Mayer, racing driver
- Joan Prince, humanitarian, former Ambassador to the General Assembly of the United Nations, former Senior Advisor to the United States Department of State, class of 1971
- Mark Wilson, five-time winner on the PGA Tour, class of 1993
- Kevin Zeitler, National Football League (NFL) offensive guard, Green Bay Packers, class of 2008
