= Ernest B. Price =

American diplomat, linguist, academic, and businessman

Dr. Ernest B. Price
- Born: October 13, 1890; Henzada, Burma
- Died: October 20, 1973 (aged 83); Los Gatos, California, USA
- Education: Wayland Academy, University of Rochester, Johns Hopkins University
- Occupations: Diplomat, linguist, university professor, business executive

Ernest Batson Price (October 13, 1890 – October 20, 1973) was an American diplomat, university professor, military officer, and businessman. He spent over twenty years in China and witnessed first-hand warlord power struggles, the growth of Japanese militarism, America's post-war diplomacy, China's civil war, and the profound social change that followed. As a result of this first-hand experience, Price was one of America's foremost authorities on Chinese language, culture, and politics from the early nineteen twenties through the mid nineteen fifties.

== Early life ==
Price was the son of Baptist missionaries serving in Henzada, Burma. He was born on October 13, 1890, the youngest of four children. After his father died in 1899, he was sent to school at Wayland Academy in Beaver Dam, Wisconsin. After high school, he taught in a small, rural school in a German-speaking community in North Dakota. While there, he learned to speak, read and write German. His fluent German helped him get into college, and later qualified him to compete for an appointment in the United States Foreign Service. He attended college at University of Rochester in Rochester, New York, graduating in 1913.

== Foreign service ==
After graduation, Price was accepted into the special China branch of the Foreign Service, and posted to China. Upon arrival, he began intensive study of Mandarin, China's official language, with a traditional Chinese scholar. In less than two years he was fluent in Mandarin, and was posted to Tientsin as vice consul.

He had met Florence Mary Bentley when he was studying at Rochester. Since state-side leave was not authorized for junior diplomats, he arranged an administrative trip to Yokohama, Japan, in 1915. Florence joined him there, and they were married. The Prices spent the next 15 years in China where all five of their children were born.

In China, personal friendships were critical, and Price had many influential friends throughout China. He eventually got to know numerous warlords, and dealt with them on a personal basis as he tried to expand American trade without taking sides in China's internal power struggles. The personal relationships that Price built with powerful Chinese leaders provided an important counterbalance to Imperial Japan's growing military presence in China and the influence of Comintern agents like Mikhail Borodin.

In Canton, Price met Doctor Sun Yat-sen, who later became the first President of the Republic of China. They became good friends and often discussed politics over the bridge table. Their friendship continued even after Price was reassigned to Fuzhou where he served as United States consul. Sun Yat-sen personally invited both Price and his wife to his inauguration ceremony staged by the Nationalist government. The United States did not recognize the Nationalist government, choosing instead to retain official ties with the rival government in Peking. Therefore, Price could not attend a Nationalist-sponsored ceremony. Mrs. Price, however, was not a Government official so she did attend, and her detailed report of the event was passed to the United States Department of State in a formal dispatch.

In 1920, when he was Assistant Chinese Secretary in the American Legation in Peking, Price was assigned to escort an American trading company's caravan of Model-T Fords from the Chinese border, across the Gobi Desert to Urga, Mongolia (now Ulaanbaatar). While he was responsible for negotiating passage for the American businessmen though the territory of various Chinese warlords, Price was also charged with a secret mission of contacting the United States consul in Irkutsk, Russia. Due to the chaos in Siberia caused by the Bolshevik revolution and the subsequent civil war in Russia, the American consul had not been heard from in many months. Price was successful in both tasks, and returned to China in the company of Roy Chapman Andrews, the well known archeologist and adventurer who is often cited as the inspiration for Indiana Jones. Andrews recounted the journey in this book Across Mongolian Plain. Here is how Andrews recalled one of their travel adventures:

Price and I drove back to Panj-kiang to obtain extra food and water ... We had gone only five miles when we discovered that there was no more oil for our motor ... Just then the car swung over the summit of a raise, and we saw the white tents and grazing camels of an enormous caravan. Of course, Mongols would have mutton fat and why not use that for oil! The caravan leader assured us that he had fat in plenty and in ten minutes a great pot of it was warming over the fire. We poured it into the motor and proceeded merrily on our way.

Andrews also incorporated the true story of Price's hunt for a man-eating tiger in the mountains of southern China into his adventure novel Quest of the Snow Leopard.

In 1928, Price was sent to re-open the United States consulate in Nanjing. On 1 June 1929, Price and his wife attended the state burial ceremony for Sun Yat-sen at the Sun Yat-sen Mausoleum near Nanjing. They were special guests of the Chinese government along with John Van Antwerp MacMurray, the United States Minister to China.

Price continued to serve in diplomatic posts throughout China until late 1929 when he left the Foreign Service to become President of China Airways (now China National Aviation Corporation, parent company of Air China), a post he held for two years before returning to the United States to pursue a doctoral degree.

== Academic career ==
Before beginning his doctoral studies at Johns Hopkins University, Price worked as a Special Assistant to the President of the University of Oregon. While there, he began a lifelong friendship with a young law professor named Wayne Morse whom Oregonians later elected to four terms in the United States Senate.

Johns Hopkins awarded Price a PhD in political science in 1933, and published his book, The Russo-Japanese Treaties of 1907-1916 Concerning Manchuria and Mongolia that same year. The book chronicled the remorseless efforts of Japan and Russia to carve up northeast Asia. In 1935, Price visited Manchukuo, Japan's puppet state in Northeast China, and met with the last Manchu emperor, Pu Yi. His book along with a number of academic articles published in the mid-nineteen thirties when he was a fellow at the Brookings Institution highlighted the threat of Japanese imperialism in Manchuria and China. Price warned that Japan's aggressive policies could lead to a serious international conflict. His writing helped initiate the public debate over the "China question" in the years leading up to World War II. His warnings proved to be both prophetic and timely.

In 1936, Doctor Price became director of International House at the University of Chicago. Price spoke three European languages and at least three varieties of Chinese, so he was well suited to host the many distinguished foreign visitors who passed through International House. He also taught Chinese studies in the university's political science department.

== World War II ==
During the early days of World War II, Price was associated with the Office of Strategic Services (forerunner of the Central Intelligence Agency). Price's analysis of the war in China and related United States policy options were passed to President Franklin D. Roosevelt either through Major General William Donovan, head of the Office of Strategic Services, or in some cases, directly to the President. In 1944, he was released for duty with the United States Marine Corps, and commissioned as a Captain to begin planning for an allied invasion of Japanese occupied China. However, he also maintained ties with the Office of Strategic Services until it was disbanded in 1945.

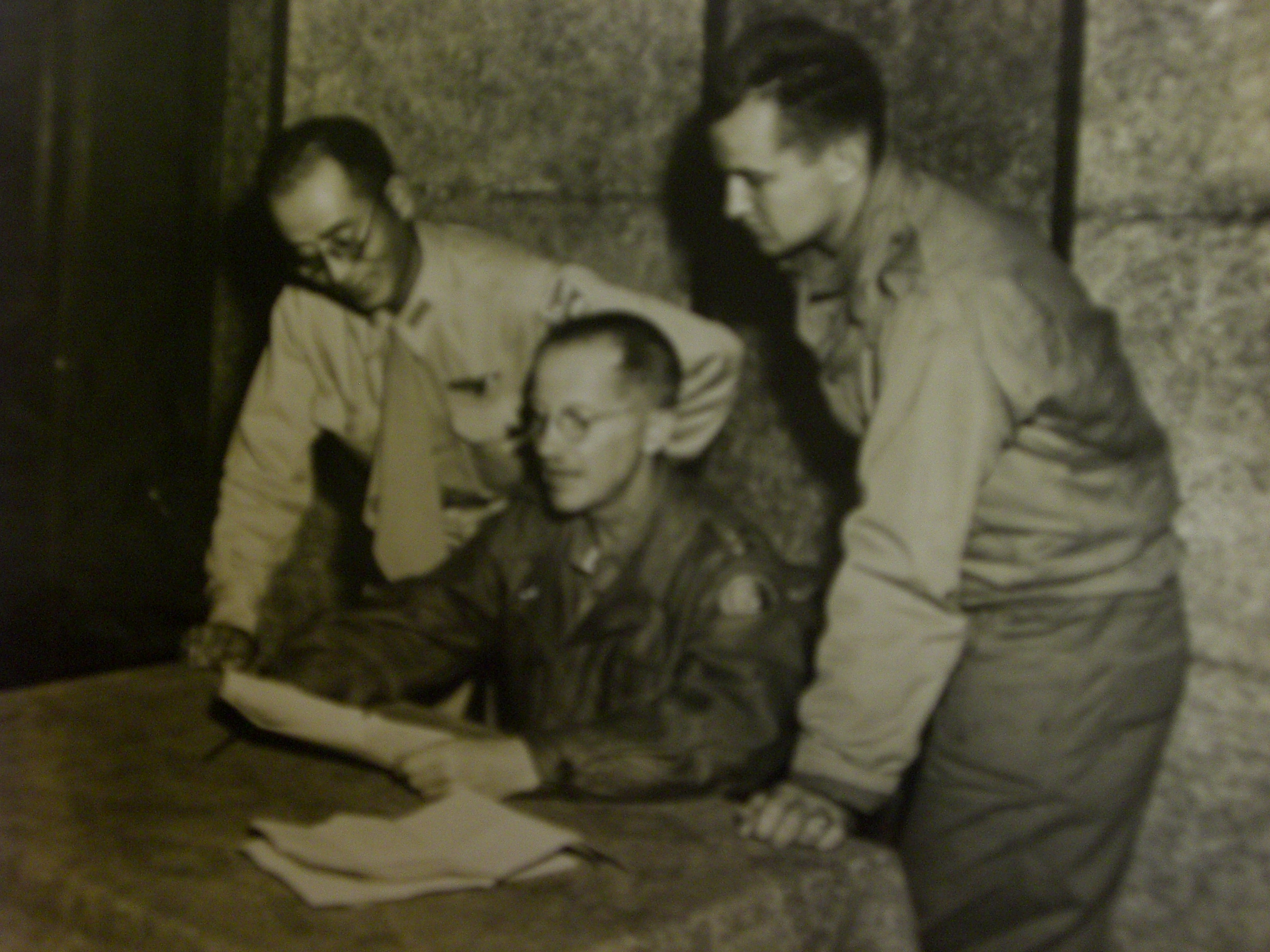
Price announcing Japanese surrender in China

After the atomic bomb was dropped on Japan in August 1945, Price was immediately dispatched to China, and landed with the first wave of American occupation troops. He was assigned as the civil affairs liaison officer on the personal staff of Major General Lemuel C. Shepherd, Jr., commander of the 6th Marine Division. Price was present for the formal surrender of Japanese forces in China on October 25, 1945, and made the first Chinese-language radio announcement of the surrender. In February 1946, he received a Bronze Star medal for his "sound advice based on a thorough understanding of the Chinese people and of the civil affairs associated with the occupation of an area in which political and civil government problems were most complex."

Following the war, Price remained in China to support the United States ambassador, General Patrick Hurley, and later General George C. Marshall as they tried to negotiate a coalition government that would prevent a bloody civil war between Chiang Kai-shek's Nationalist forces and Mao Zedong's communists. Both negotiation efforts ultimately failed; however, General Marshall awarded Price a second Bronze Star for his support. The award cited his "keen sense of judgment particularly with regard to the diplomatic behavior demanded while acting in the capacity of liaison officer between high ranking Chinese officials and United States forces."

== Post-war career ==
Price returned to the United States and was released from active duty in April 1946. However, he remained an officer in the Marine Corps reserve until 1954, ending his military career as a reserve Major.

Shortly after leaving active duty, Doctor Price accepted a position with Standard Vacuum Oil Company (now part of ExxonMobil). It was the company's intent to expand their oil exploration work into China when the political situation there stabilized. Price became the company's agent in Hong Kong and then Shanghai. He continued working there until the communist revolution forced the company to withdraw from mainland China. Price stayed with the company until he finally retired in 1960. He died on October 20, 1973, in Los Gatos, California.

== Achievements ==
Doctor Price's diplomatic dispatches, journals, correspondence, speeches, lecture material, and other papers are now in the Hoover Institute archives at Stanford University. A detailed catalog of the archived materials has been compiled by the Institute staff and is available on-line through the California Digital Library. His book, The Russo-Japanese Treaties of 1907-1916 Concerning Manchuria and Mongolia is still available in the reference section of many public policy libraries including the National Defense University library at Fort McNair in Washington, D.C.
