= Michigan Lutheran Seminary =

Private college preparatory school in Saginaw, Michigan, United States

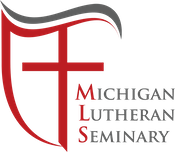

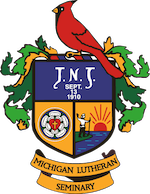

Location
- 2777 Hardin Street; Saginaw, Saginaw County, Michigan 48602; United States; 43°25′43″N 83°58′41″W

Information
- Type: Private, preparatory, day & boarding
- Religious affiliation: Wisconsin Evangelical Lutheran Synod
- Established: September 13, 1910
- CEEB code: 233300
- NCES School ID: 00643303
- President: Rev. Mark Luetzow
- Dean: Rev. Troy Schreiner
- Teaching staff: 25.8 (2017-18)
- Grades: 9 to 12
- Gender: Coeducational
- Enrollment: 188 (2024-25)
- Student to teacher ratio: 7.7 (2017-18)
- Campus type: Urban
- Colors: Red and white
- Athletics conference: Tri-Valley Conference West
- Sports: Boys: Cross Country, Football, Basketball, Wrestling, Track & Field, Baseball Girls: Cross Country, Volleyball, Basketball, Poms, Wrestling, Track & Field, Softball
- Mascot: Conrad the Cardinal
- Newspaper: The Red 'n' White
- Yearbook: The Cardinal
- School hymn: God's Word Is Our Great Heritage
- Website: mlsem.org

Michigan Lutheran Seminary (MLS) is a coeducational, private preparatory school for boarding and day students in grades 9 through 12. Located in Saginaw, Michigan, the school encourages students to become pastors and teachers in the Wisconsin Evangelical Lutheran Synod, continuing their education at Martin Luther College in New Ulm, Minnesota.

Founded as a preparatory school in 1910, MLS is operated by the Wisconsin Synod. In 2017, the school enrolled 199 students. The school's curriculum focuses on theology, foreign languages, and the liberal arts. MLS sponsors 12 interscholastic athletic teams and provides ministry experiences domestically and abroad.

== History ==
The Saginaw seminary with students and faculty

=== Origins as a pastoral seminary ===
Michigan Lutheran Seminary began in 1885 as a seminary to train pastors for the Evangelical Lutheran Synod of Michigan. The school opened in Manchester, Michigan, with one professor and six students. Two years later, MLS moved to Saginaw, Michigan, onto a site donated by a local pastor.

In 1892, the Evangelical Lutheran Synod of Michigan joined the Synodical Conference and federated with Lutheran synods in Minnesota and Wisconsin. The three confederated synods agreed to convert MLS from a seminary to a preparatory school. Disagreement over this decision led the Michigan Synod to withdraw from the confederation, and MLS continued as a seminary until declining enrollments led to its closure in 1907.

Soon, the Michigan Synod again federated with the Minnesota and Wisconsin Synods and negotiated the school's reopening in Saginaw.

=== Preparatory school ===
On September 13, 1910, Michigan Lutheran Seminary opened as a preparatory school to train pastors and teachers for the Wisconsin Evangelical Lutheran Synod. Rev. Otto J.R. Hoenecke was installed as the new school's first president. An athletic program was formed when the MLS baseball team began competition in 1911. The preparatory school graduated its first class in 1914.

The school saw growth in enrollment, campus expansion, and construction through the 1920s. The MLS basketball team won district championships in 1928 and 1929 and reached Michigan state finals in 1938.

=== Development ===
Following a decline in enrollment during the 1930s, growth and rapid development of Michigan Lutheran Seminary began again in the 1940s. As student enrollment outgrew facilities, the Wisconsin Synod authorized new construction. Under school president Rev. Conrad Frey, MLS completed a combined classroom building and gymnasium in 1951, a dining hall in 1954, and a library and student union in 1964.

In 1966, Rev. Martin Toepel replaced Frey as president and oversaw the replacement of all student housing, dedicating a 346-person residence hall in 1976. His successor, Rev. John Lawrenz, relocated the dining hall and converted existing space into a chapel in 1980. The addition of a new gymnasium and a remodeling of the campus was completed in 1985. Additional land for athletic programs was purchased and developed throughout the 1970s and 1980s.

MLS began offering ministry experiences for students in the 1970s and 1980s. The Taste of Ministry program first provided students exposure to teaching careers in Lutheran schools. In 1988, MLS began a similar program for students interested in careers as pastors. In the early 1980s, MLS initiated international exchange programs with schools and churches in West Germany and Mexico, later developing a program titled Project Titus. Project Titus makes domestic and foreign mission work available to students.

=== Recent years ===
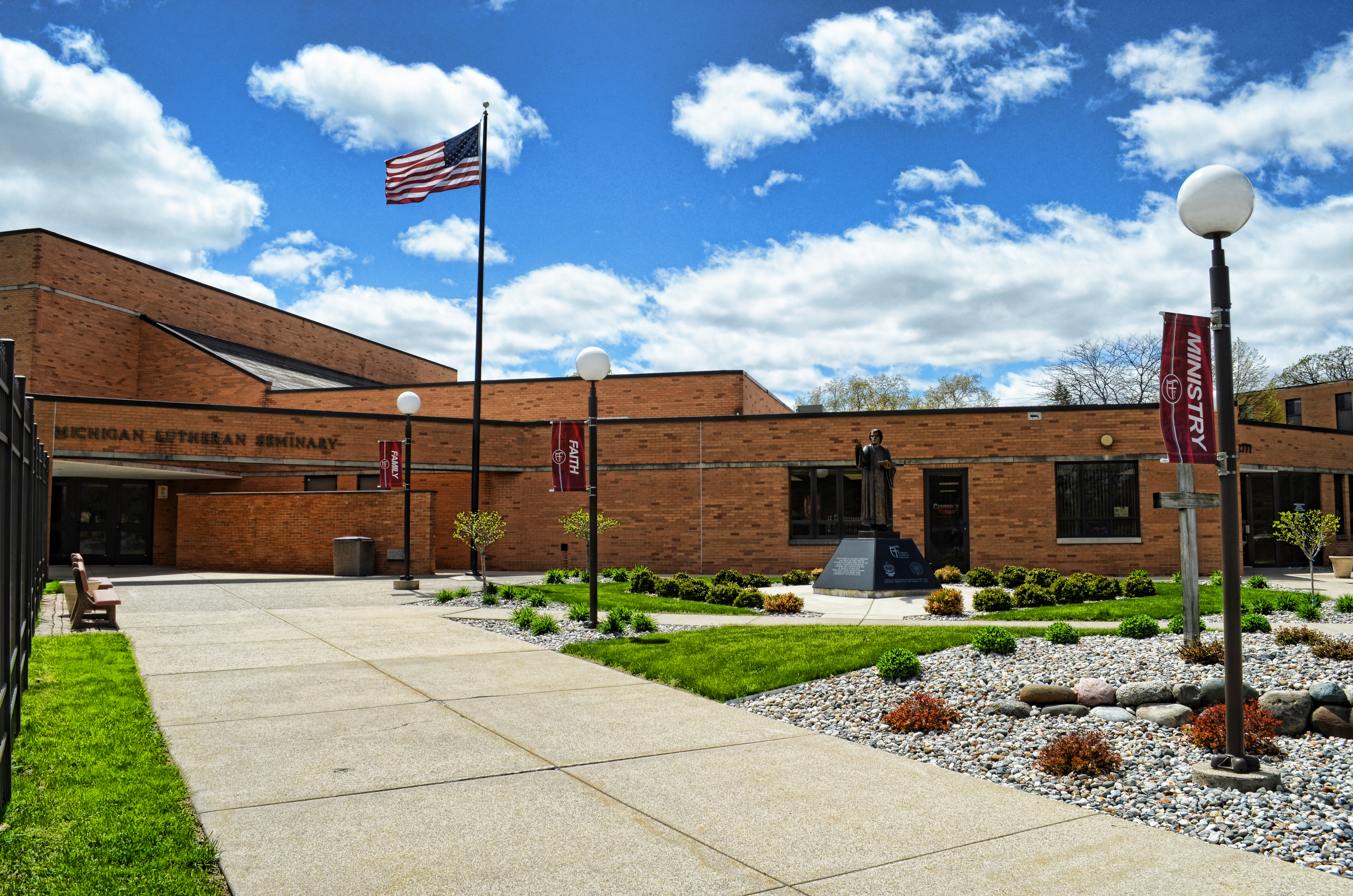
The main entrance at Michigan Lutheran Seminary

Michigan Lutheran Seminary reached its largest enrollment in the 2001–2001 school year with 381 students. Financial crises in the United States and within the church contributed to a decline in enrollment and reduced faculty in the early 2000s. In 2007, Wisconsin Synod leadership proposed eliminating MLS from the synod's budget. The proposal was rejected by the 2007 synod convention, reasoning "...it is not prudent to downsize proven programs in vital areas of our work, like the production of pastors..."

In 2010, MLS renovated its 440-seat chapel and auditorium as part of its 100th-anniversary celebrations. All student housing was renovated in 2014. In 2016, a bronze statue of Martin Luther was installed at the school's entrance in anticipation of the 500th anniversary of the Lutheran Reformation. Since 2017, MLS has extended its Project Titus program to opportunities in Saginaw.

== Academics ==
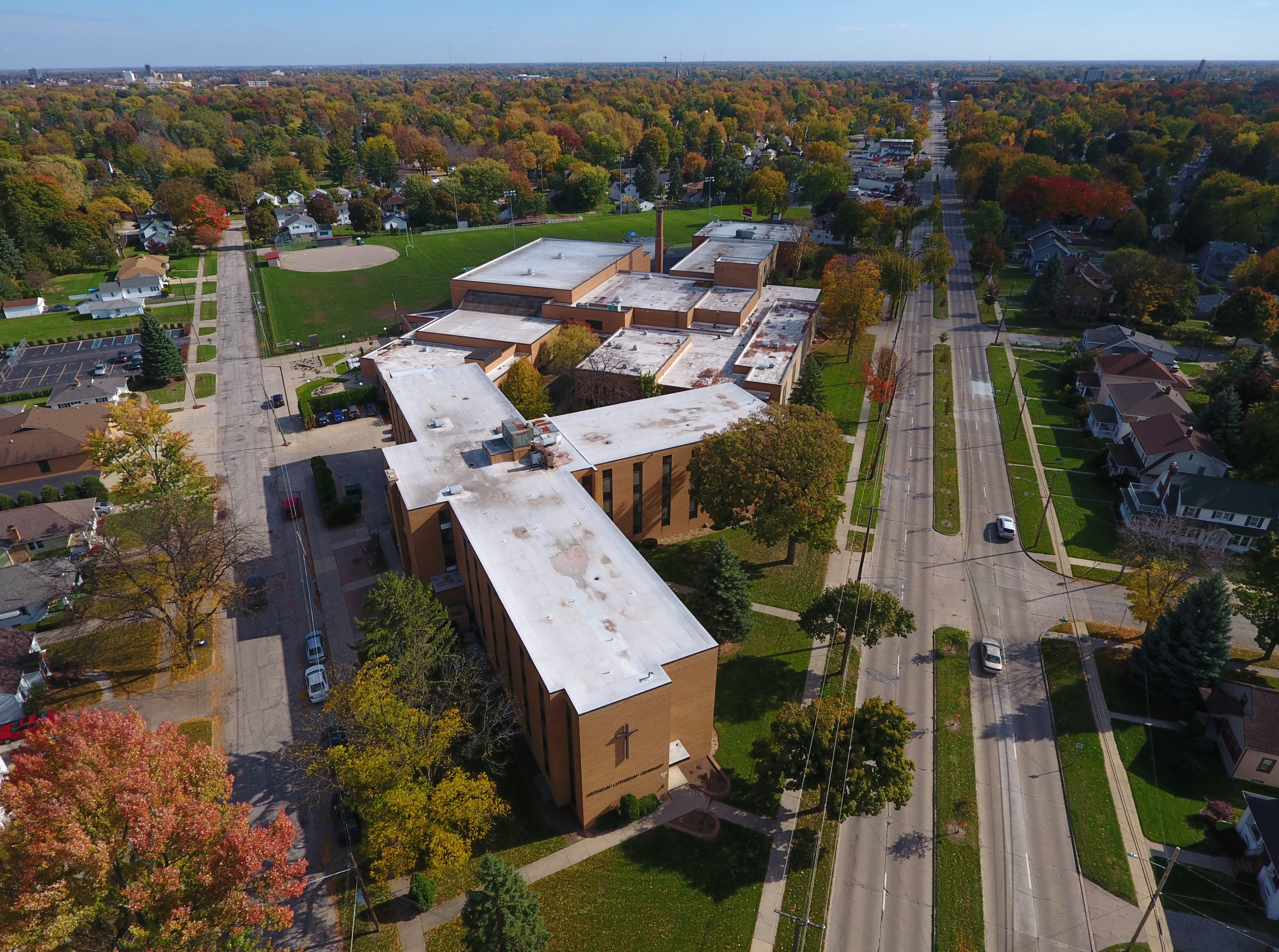
Michigan Lutheran Seminary from the northwest

=== Enrollment ===
As of 2017, Michigan Lutheran Seminary had an enrollment of 199 students and 25.8 classroom teachers (FTE), for a student-teacher ratio of 7.7. The student body is majority White, as well as Asian, Hispanic, and African-American minorities. Students come from nine states and four foreign countries (China, South Korea, Germany, and Grenada). 58% of students live on campus in student housing, while 42% are commuting day students. 53% of students receive financial assistance.

=== Programs ===
MLS aims to encourage and prepare all students for service as pastors and teachers in the Wisconsin Evangelical Lutheran Synod. The academic program at MLS prepares students to enroll at Martin Luther College in New Ulm, Minnesota. The curriculum emphasizes theology, foreign languages (Latin, German, and Spanish), and the liberal arts. Together, graduates of Michigan Lutheran Seminary and Luther Preparatory School in Watertown, Wisconsin, make up 35% of Martin Luther College undergraduate students.

== Student life ==
=== Campus ===
Michigan Lutheran Seminary is located in a residential neighborhood on the west side of Saginaw, Michigan. The school's campus includes a gymnasium, a chapel/auditorium, classrooms, a dining hall, athletic fields, and student housing. Additional athletic fields are located 1.2 miles northwest of the main campus. 58% of students board at MLS.

=== Co-curricular activities ===
==== Athletics ====
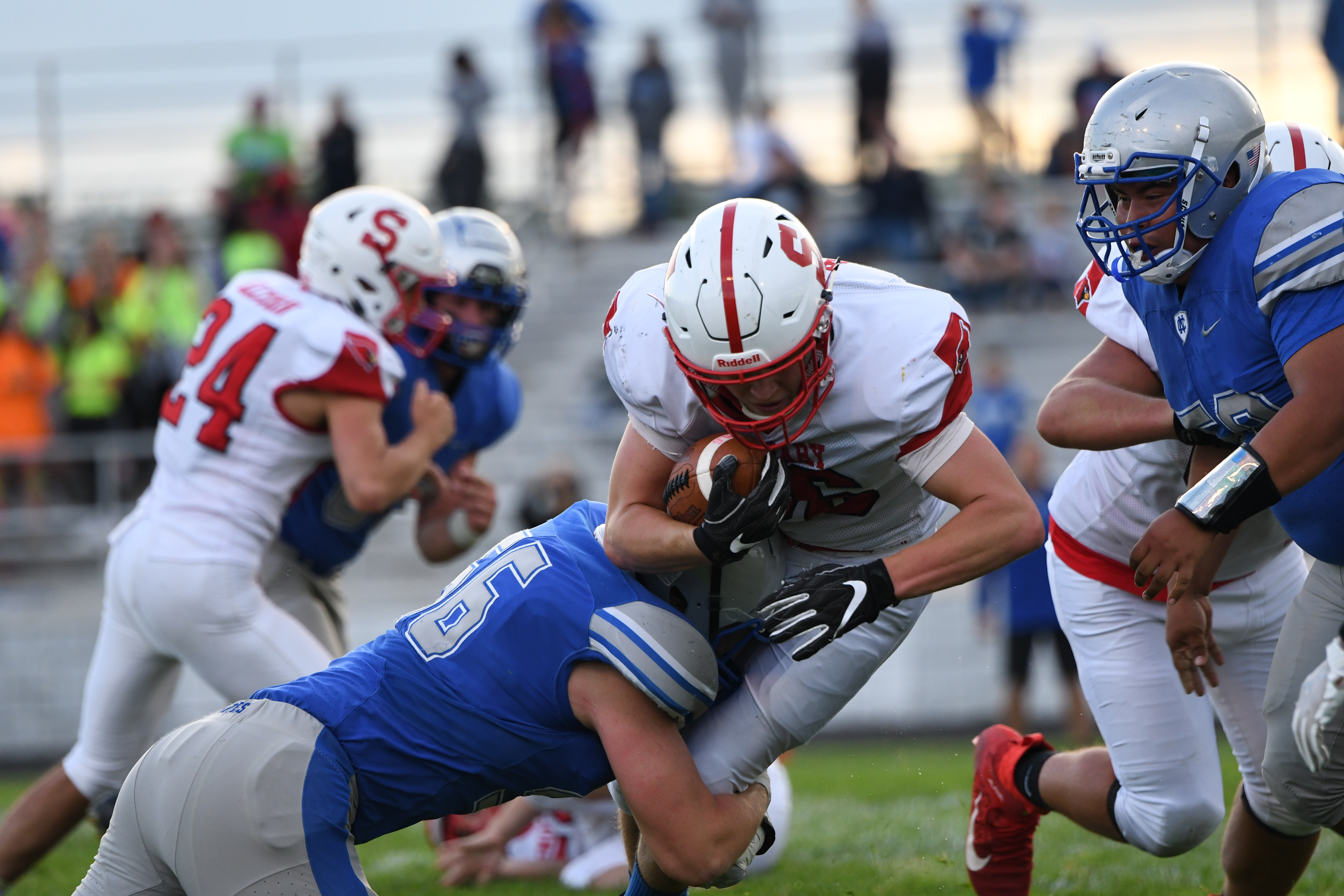
MLS Cardinals football in 2019

MLS offers intramural and interscholastic athletic programs throughout the school year. The school's 12 interscholastic programs include football, cross country, basketball, hockey (co-op), wrestling, baseball, and track and field for boys; volleyball, cross country, basketball, softball, and track and field for girls. MLS is a member of the Tri-Valley Conference (TVC), competing in the TVC West Division, and holds membership in the Michigan High School Athletic Association. The school's nickname is the Cardinals, and its colors are red and white.

==== Performing arts ====
The MLS Concert Choir is a select choir for juniors and seniors that performs sacred music within Michigan and around the United States. The Shadows is a group of student singers that tours Lutheran grade schools and promotes the purpose of MLS.

The Court Street Players is a theater group that encourages interest and involvement in the theater arts. The group performs musicals, plays, and children's theater productions.

==== Activities ====
Activities include student government, a student-run newspaper Red 'n' White, and work on the MLS yearbook The Cardinal. The MLS Student Council is an elected body that plans various events for the school.

Chapel services are held twice daily during the school week.

==== Ministry experiences ====
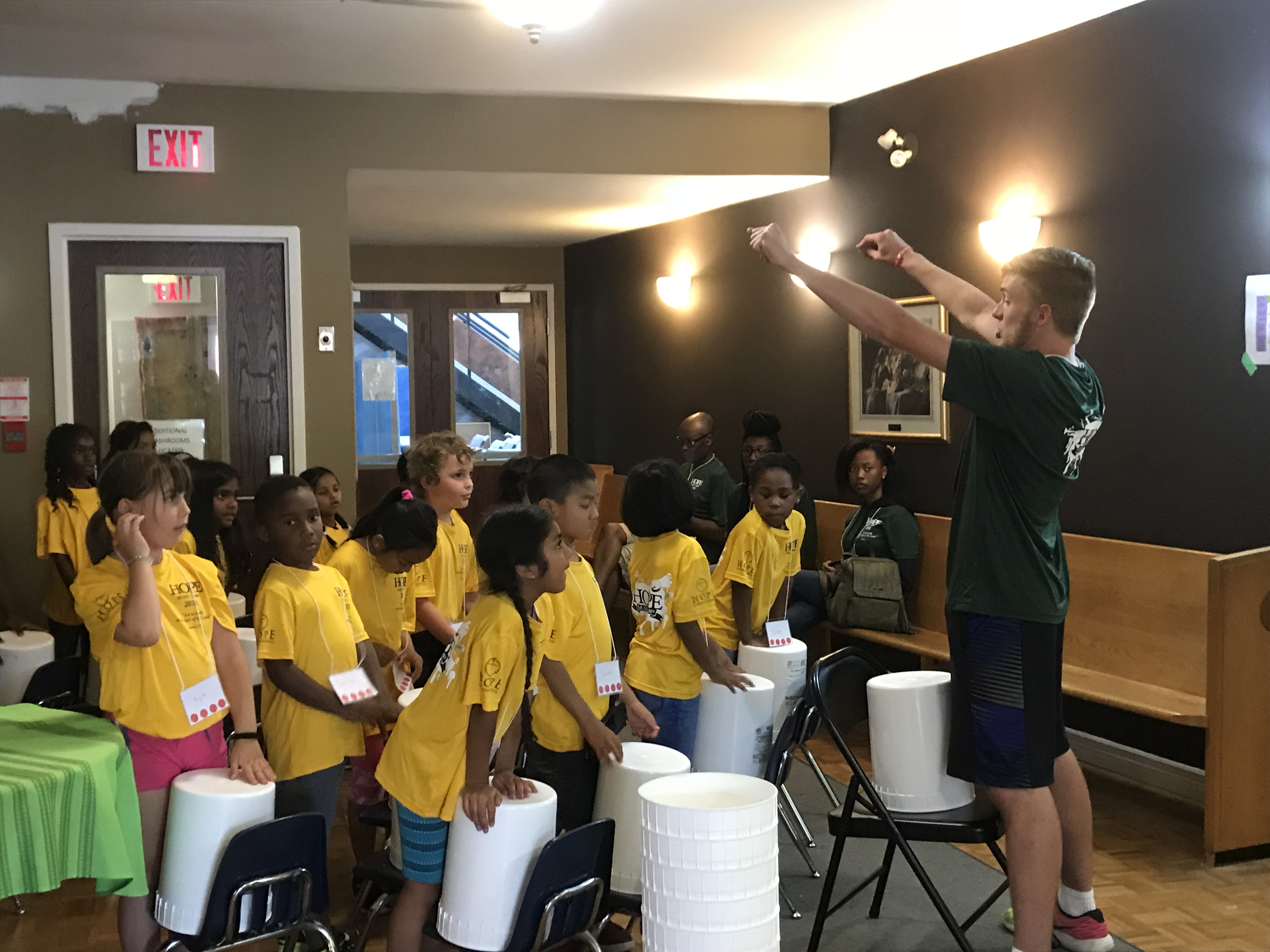
A Project Titus participant in Toronto, Ontario

Since 1981, Michigan Lutheran Seminary has offered ministry experiences through the Project Titus program. Students travel to locations in the United States and abroad to participate in cross-cultural outreach, serve congregations, and learn more about the careers of pastors and teachers. Project Titus has offered opportunities to serve locally in Saginaw since 2017.

In support of the school's purpose, area pastors lead morning chapel services, missionaries address the student body, and Martin Luther College representatives meet with students during the year. Juniors tour Wisconsin Lutheran Seminary and Martin Luther College annually. Seniors participate in the Taste of Ministry program, allowing them to shadow pastors and teachers of the Wisconsin Evangelical Lutheran Synod.

== Seal ==
Seal of Michigan Lutheran Seminary

The MLS school seal depicts a cardinal, the school's mascot. Below the cardinal there are three letters: I.N.I. and September 13, 1910—the date the school became part of the Wisconsin Evangelical Lutheran Synod. I.N.I. stands for "In Nomine Iesu" in Latin (In the name of Jesus). Below that on the lefthand side is Luther's Seal; on the righthand side is a picture from the State Flag of Michigan.

== List of presidents ==
Presidents	Years served
Revs. A. Lange, Huber, O. Hoyer, Linsemann, and Beer	1885–1907
Rev. Otto J.R. Hoenecke	1910–1950
Rev. Conrad I. Frey	1950–1966
Rev. Martin Toepel	1966–1978
Rev. Dr. John C. Lawrenz	1978–1993
Dr. William E. Zeiger (Acting)	1993–1994
Rev. Paul T. Prange	1994–2009
Dr. William E. Zeiger (Acting)	2009–2010
Rev. Aaron C. Frey	2010
Dr. William E. Zeiger (Acting)	2010–2012
Rev. Joel V. Petermann	2012–2018
Rev. Mark T. Luetzow	2018–present
