= Martin Luther College =

Private liberal arts college in New Ulm, Minnesota, United States

- Motto: Via Veritas Vita (Latin)
- Motto in English: The Way, the Truth, the Life
- Type: Private college
- Established: 1995
- Religious affiliation: Lutheran (Wisconsin Evangelical Lutheran Synod)
- Chairman: Rev. Michael Woldt
- President: Rev. Richard Gurgel
- Provost: Jeffery Wiechman
- Faculty: 87
- Students: 860 (fall 2019)
- Undergraduates: 731 (fall 2019)
- Postgraduates: 129 (fall 2019)
- Location: New Ulm, Minnesota, United States; 44°18′19″N 94°28′20″W
- Campus: 88 acres (36 ha); Small town
- Colors: Red, black & white
- Nickname: Knights
- Sporting affiliations: NCAA Division III – UMAC
- Website: mlc-wels.edu

Martin Luther College (MLC) is a private Christian college in New Ulm, Minnesota, United States. It is operated by the Wisconsin Evangelical Lutheran Synod (WELS). Martin Luther College was established in 1995, when Northwestern College of Watertown, Wisconsin, combined with Dr. Martin Luther College of New Ulm on the latter's campus.

MLC offers several undergraduate and graduate degree programs, all of which train students for service in the WELS. Men who graduate from the college's pre-seminary program may enroll at Wisconsin Lutheran Seminary. Men and women who graduate from its education programs may be assigned by the WELS as teachers and staff ministers to synod churches, schools, and missions. In 2019, MLC enrolled 731 undergraduate students and 129 graduate students.

Situated on a bluff above the Minnesota River, MLC's 88-acre (36 ha) campus is a neighbor to Hermann Heights Monument and is home to the 38,000-square-foot (3,500 m^{2}) Chapel of the Christ. The college's Gothic Revival-inspired Old Main building was added to the National Register of Historic Places in 1979 for having state-level significance in the themes of architecture, education, and religion.

Martin Luther College's 16 varsity sports teams compete at the NCAA Division III level and are known as the Knights. The college is a member of the Upper Midwest Athletic Conference.

== History ==
- Old Main, Dr. Martin Luther College
- U.S. National Register of Historic Places
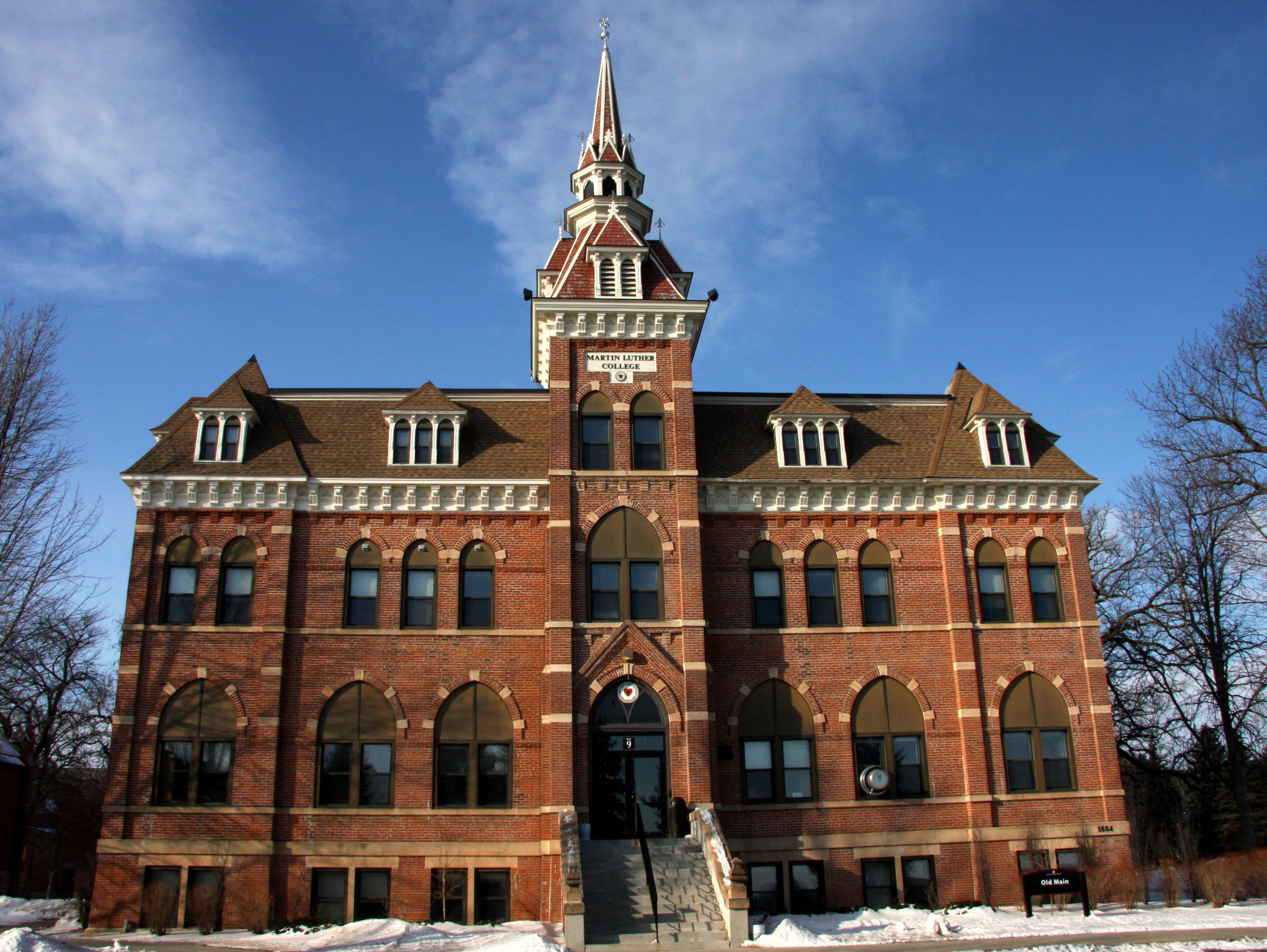
- Old Main in winter
- Location: College Heights, New Ulm, Minnesota
- Coordinates: 44°18′20.7″N 94°28′16.2″W
- NRHP reference No.: 79001208
- Added to NRHP: 31 December 1979

Martin Luther College was established in 1995 when Northwestern College (NWC), in Watertown, Wisconsin, combined with Dr. Martin Luther College (DMLC), in New Ulm, Minnesota, at the New Ulm campus.

=== Northwestern College ===
Northwestern College was established in 1865 to train pastors for the Wisconsin Synod.

After the Wisconsin Synod was founded in 1850, the church body had received its pastors from mission societies in Germany. But as the synod developed a more confessional stance, a desire to train its own pastors grew. Furthermore, it was becoming more challenging to provide the church body with enough pastors. In 1863, the Wisconsin Synod passed a resolution to establish a college and seminary in Watertown for the training of its own ministers in America.

==== Beginnings ====
Northwestern College began operation in 1865, when the first building was dedicated. The square-shaped building, topped by a small, square cupola, was affectionately called the Kaffeemuehle, or coffee grinder, by Northwestern's early, mostly German-speaking students. The building housed the college, its preparatory department, and a seminary.

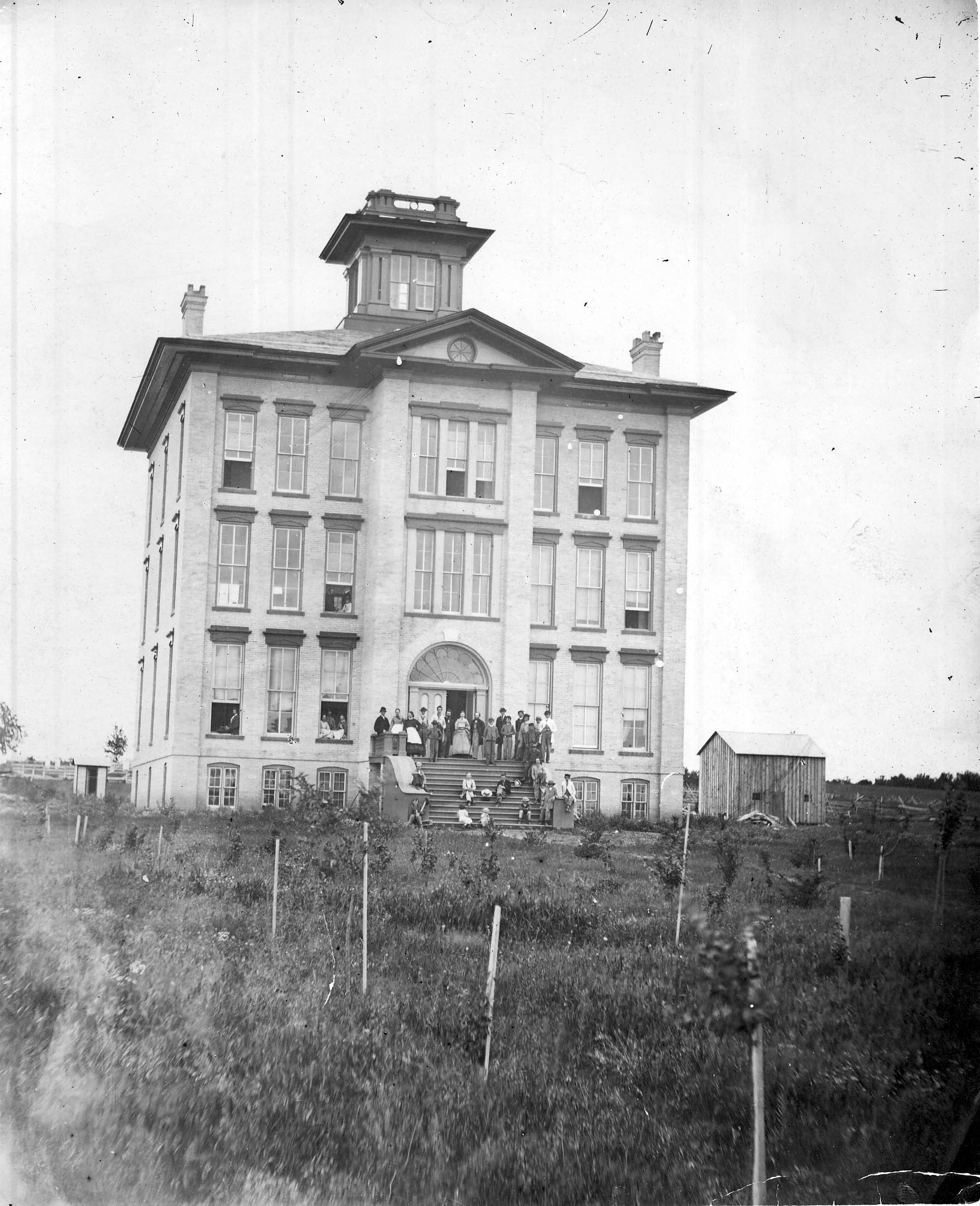
The Kaffeemuehle at Northwestern College in 1866

Financial hardship marked the earliest years of Northwestern due to a lack of interest from Wisconsin Synod congregations, yet in 1868 the college built a new dormitory and added 30 acres (12 ha) to its property.

The Wisconsin Synod also solidified its confessional stance during this time and entered into fellowship with the Missouri Synod. The seminary then combined with the Missouri Synod seminary in St. Louis. The college provided pre-seminary training for both synods.

Professor August Ernst was installed as a professor in 1869 and became college president. He redesigned the college's institutional structure to match the German Gymnasium system. The college and preparatory departments included seven class levels, each designated by a Latin name. The Latin names are still in use at Luther Preparatory School.

The teaching department left in 1892 for New Ulm when the Wisconsin, Minnesota, and Michigan synods federated, leaving the pre-seminary department in Watertown.

On the night of July 30, 1894, the Kaffeemuehle was struck by lightning and set ablaze. The building was destroyed, and the college constructed the Recitation Building in its place by 1895.

In 1909, the Northwestern Club of Milwaukee, an alumni group, gave its alma mater a gymnasium. At the gymnasium's dedication in 1912, St. Matthew's congregation of Milwaukee presented a statue representing a "Sprinter on His Marks", commonly called the Sprinter, and President William Taft sent a congratulatory telegram.

==== Later years ====
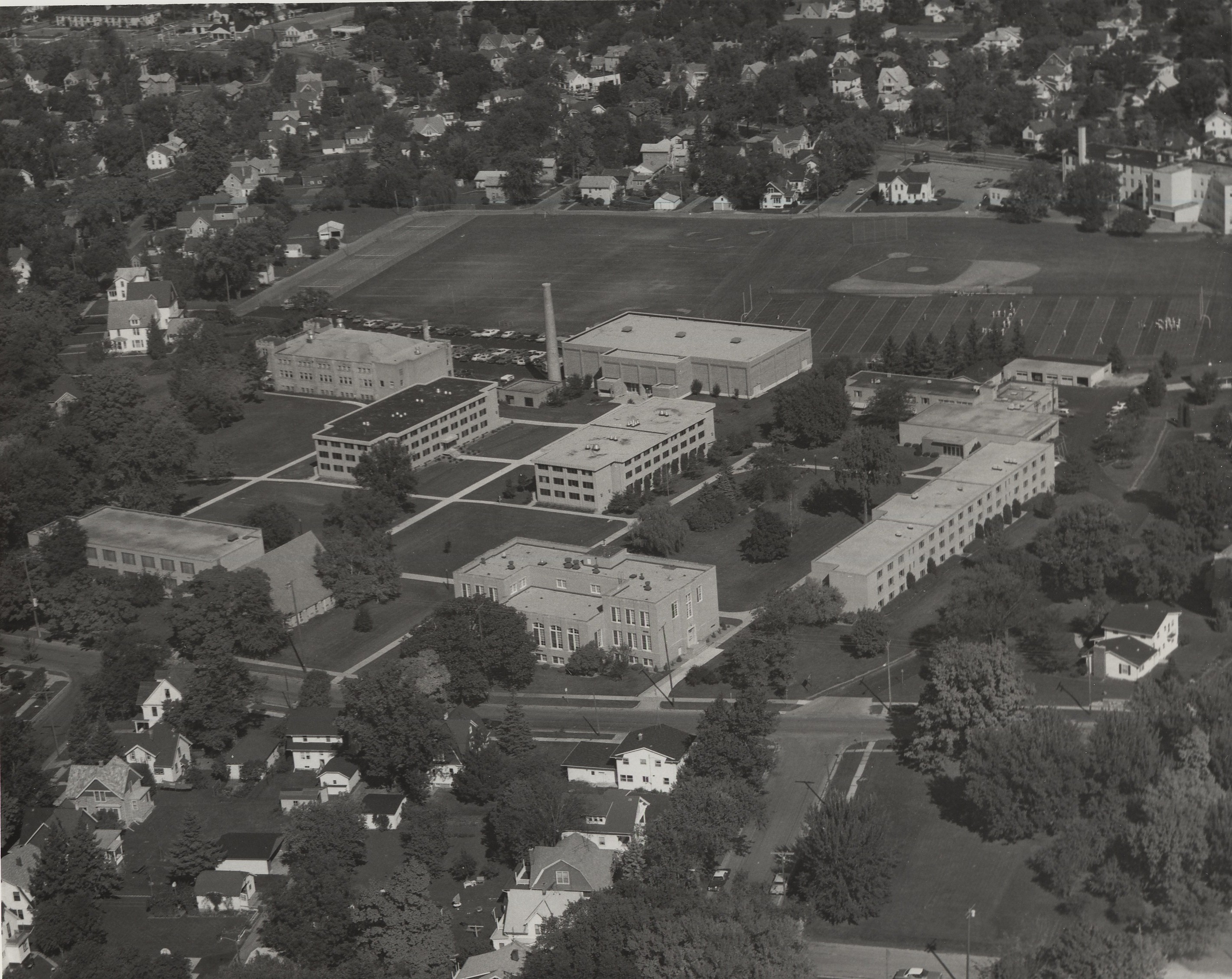
The campus of Northwestern College in 1975, following major campus expansion

Through a special offering collected at WELS congregations, many improvements and building projects were completed at the campuses of Northwestern College and Dr. Martin Luther College, beginning in the 1950s. Meta Kilgas Michelson of Manitowoc, Wisconsin, bequeathed the funds to build a campus chapel at NWC, which was dedicated in 1956.

By 1974, the preparatory department began to operate apart from the college as Northwestern Preparatory School, today's Luther Preparatory School, but continued to share a campus with Northwestern College. Luther Preparatory School has remained on this campus since then.

=== Dr. Martin Luther College ===
Dr. Martin Luther College was established in 1884 to train pastors and teachers for the Minnesota Synod, one of the church bodies incorporated into the present-day WELS in 1917.

The Minnesota Synod, founded in 1860, suffered from doctrinal disunity and a shortage of workers in its early years. The synod sought to resolve these issues by establishing its own theological school in Minnesota.

==== Early years ====
The Minnesota Synod received several bids from communities to be the new school's location. New Ulm was chosen due to its favorable site, the persuasion of Reverend C. J. Albrecht, and the large support from both Albrecht's congregation in New Ulm and members of the New Ulm community. Albrecht later became DLMC's first president.

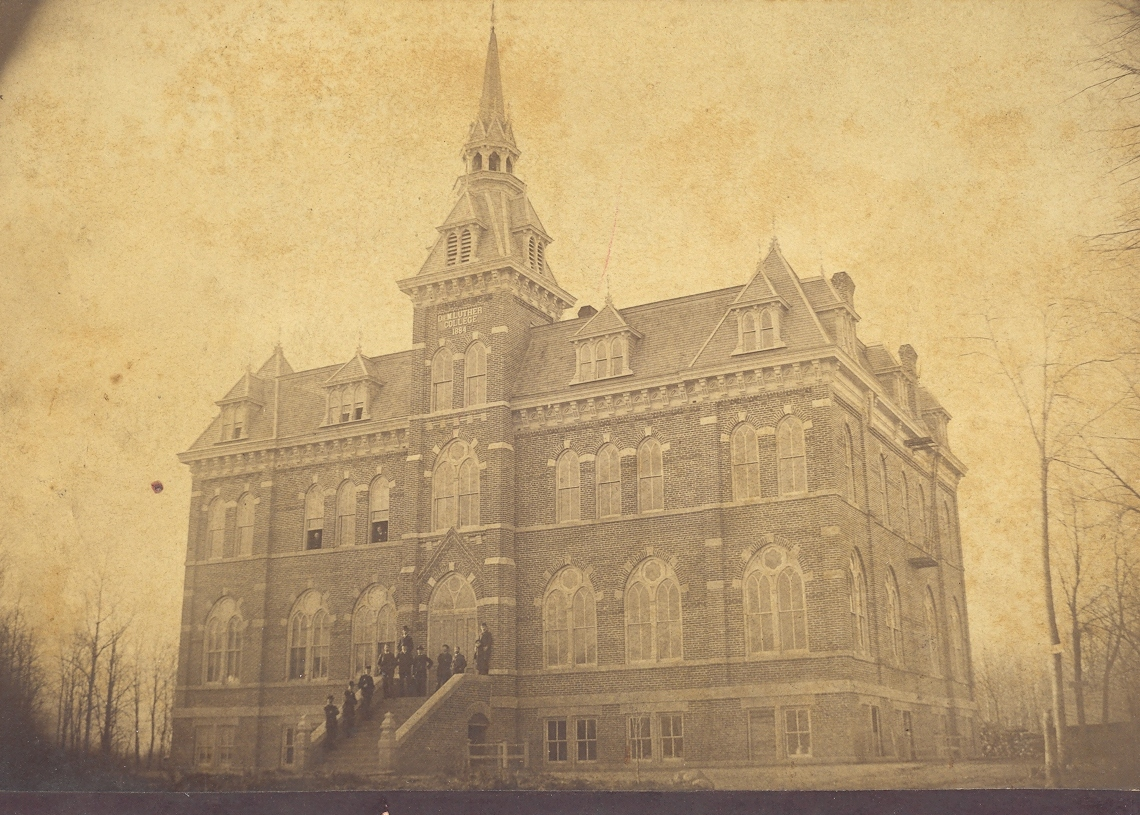
Old Main in the 1880s

Dr. Martin Luther College began operation in 1884. In its early years, preparatory, college, and seminary departments were all kept on the same campus. The school's direction changed in 1892, when the Wisconsin, Minnesota, and Michigan synods federated. The synods resolved to exclusively train their pastors at Northwestern College and their teachers at DMLC, beginning in the 1893–94 school year.

DMLC began admitting women in 1896. In the late 19th and early 20th centuries, some Wisconsin and Missouri Synod leaders had misgivings about employing women to teach in their schools. But by 1938, coeducation was also offered by the Missouri Synod's Concordia Teachers College, and by 1984 the graduating class of DMLC was 74% female.

In 1908, Fritz Reuter became DMLC's chair of music. He had initiated a strong music tradition at the college by the time of his death in 1924. While at DMLC he established singing classes and organized male and mixed choruses. Reuter also composed and arranged many hymns, several of which are used today in Christian Worship: A Lutheran Hymnal, commissioned by the WELS.

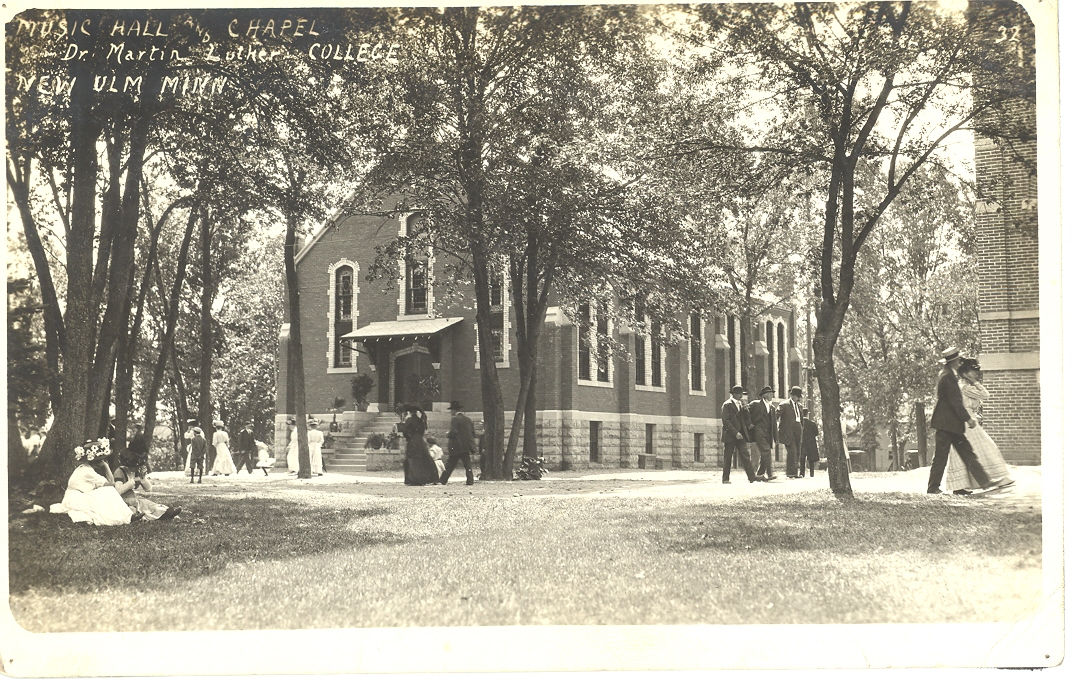
The Aula served as the college's first chapel.

Under the presidency of Adolph Ackerman, the college began to expand its facilities. After receiving land donations from the New Ulm Commercial Club and public works improvements from the city of New Ulm, the college constructed a chapel/auditorium and a dormitory, Summit Hall, in 1911.

During World War I, New Ulm hosted several rallies led by speakers who opposed American involvement in the war. Speakers included local politicians, businessmen, and leaders, including Ackerman. Amid the anti-German feelings of the time, and by recommendation of the Minnesota Commission of Public Safety, New Ulm's mayor and city attorney were both removed from office. The commission also threatened to close the college. Soon after, the DMLC Board of Control asked Ackerman to resign.

As the student body of the college continued to grow, construction began on a new classroom building, now called the Wittenberg Collegiate Center. It was dedicated on October 14, 1928.

==== Expansion and growth ====
After recovering from low enrollments and financial hardships in the 1930s, DMLC began to expand its facilities and programs considerably in the 1950s and 1960s. Fundraising efforts across the WELS supported the construction of buildings on not only the DMLC campus but also the Northwestern College campus. At DMLC, these buildings were constructed as the college experienced rapidly increasing enrollment. During these years the college added new positions and developed new courses, including a secondary education program. DMLC's preparatory department also separated from the college during this time, becoming Dr. Martin Luther High School in 1962. The high school changed its name to Martin Luther Academy (MLA) in 1967.

DMLC continued to grow in the 1970s. Another dormitory was dedicated in 1970 and a library building was dedicated in 1971. DMLC reinstated its football team in 1971. A rivalry with Northwestern College began when DMLC's football team began competitive play in 1972. Enrollment at the New Ulm campus continued to grow, so in 1979 Martin Luther Academy moved to the former campus of Campion High School in Prairie du Chien, Wisconsin, and became Martin Luther Preparatory School.

The staff ministry program began at DMLC in 1993.

=== Martin Luther College ===
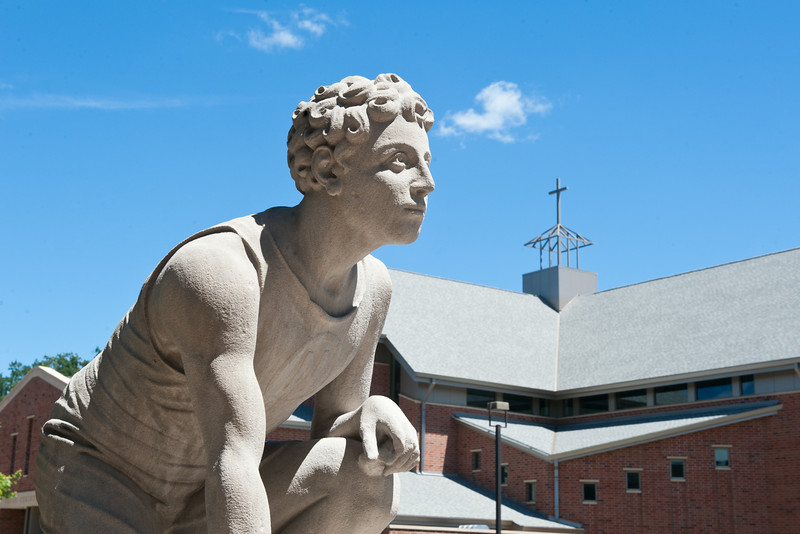
The Sprinter moved with Northwestern College in 1995.

After a thorough study of its worker training schools, the WELS voted at its convention in 1993 to merge its pastor and teacher training colleges on the campus of Dr. Martin Luther College in New Ulm. The merger was completed In 1995, with the merged institution taking the name Martin Luther College starting with the 1995–96 school year.

In 1995, a group of students moved the Sprinter statue from NWC's Watertown, Wisconsin, campus to New Ulm after the college administration decided to leave it in Watertown. The same year, the Northwestern College Board of Control donated a statue of Martin Luther to the New Ulm campus. Theodore Olsen became president of the college in 1995.

Martin Luther College began offering a graduate degree program in 2005. Mark Zarling was installed as president in 2007.

==== Recent history ====
In 2009, Martin Luther College dedicated a new soccer field. The Chapel of the Christ was dedicated in 2010 to commemorate the 150th anniversary of the WELS.

The college conducted a capital campaign in conjunction with its silver anniversary in 2020. The campaign goals included heightened recruitment efforts, increased financial aid for students, and expansion of campus facilities.

== Academics ==
As of 2019, Martin Luther College had 731 undergraduate students and 129 graduate students and employed 87 full-time and adjunct faculty. MLC offers a Bachelor of Arts degree through its pre-seminary program and a Bachelor of Science degree through its education and staff ministry programs. Through its Graduate Studies program, the college grants Master of Science degrees in Education, Educational Administration, and Theological Studies. All programs of study at Martin Luther College train students for service in the Wisconsin Evangelical Lutheran Synod.

=== Pre-seminary program ===
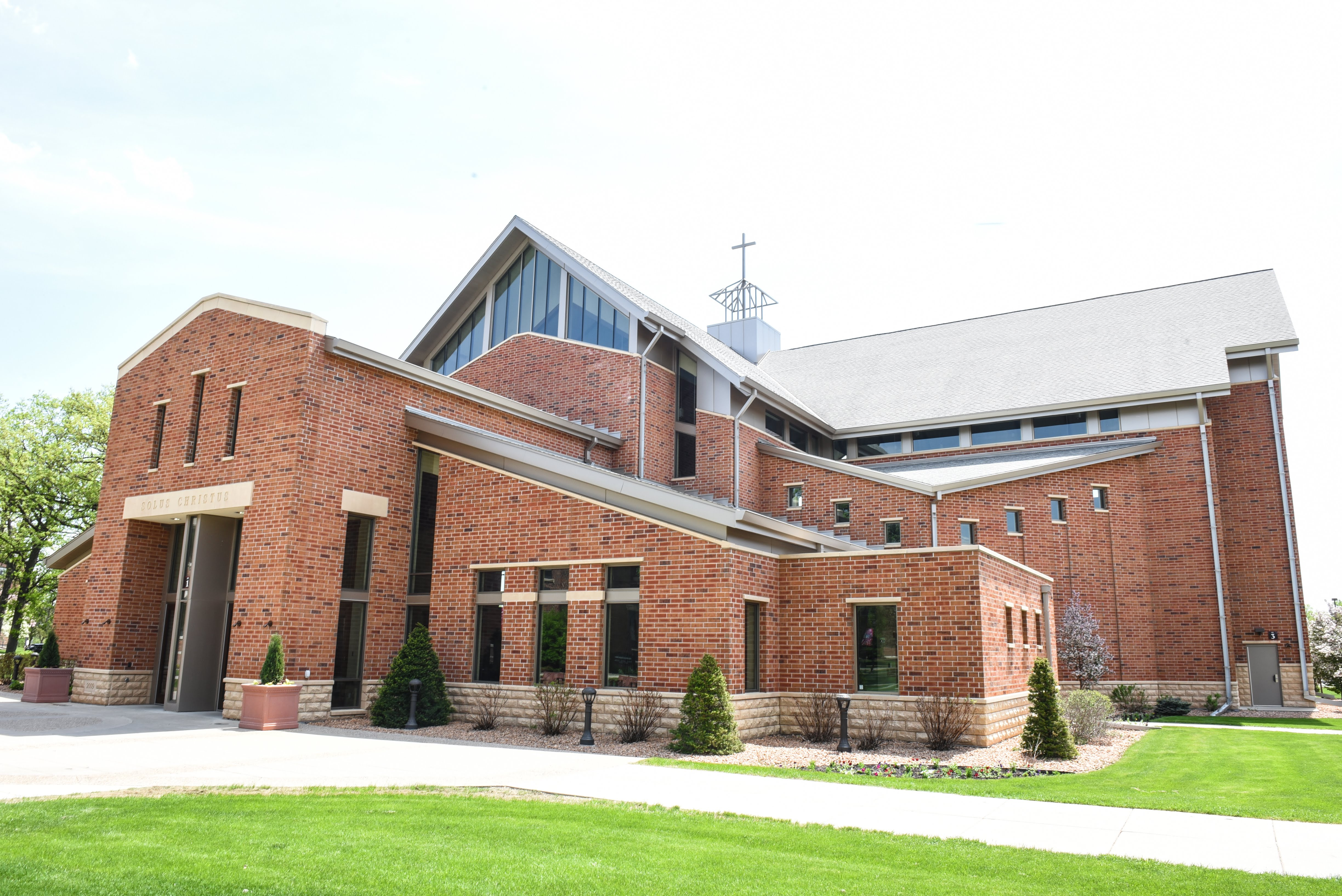
The Chapel of the Christ

Martin Luther College's pre-seminary program prepares students for enrollment at Wisconsin Lutheran Seminary. Beyond its general education requirements and theology courses, the pre-seminary program stresses foreign languages. To graduate, students must complete courses in Hebrew and Greek, the original languages of the Bible, and select studies in a non-biblical foreign language. Language courses at MLC include Spanish, Latin, German, and Mandarin Chinese. In addition, the curriculum has a selective liberal arts emphasis, with special attention to literature and history.

After completing the pre-seminary program, students earn a Bachelor of Arts degree. In accordance with WELS beliefs about the roles of men and women in the church, only men may continue their education at Wisconsin Lutheran Seminary in Mequon, Wisconsin.

=== Education program ===
The college's education program prepares students for service as teachers in the schools and congregations of the WELS. MLC offers a Bachelor of Science degree to students with majors in early childhood education, elementary education, secondary education and special education. Students may also choose to complete a double major. The education curriculum at MLC includes music courses so that graduates may serve as organists and choir directors in WELS congregations. In addition to general education and professional education courses, students complete five field experiences and two student teaching experiences in classroom settings.

After completing all graduation and Minnesota licensure requirements, students may be eligible for assignment by the WELS as teachers to synod congregations and schools.

In June 2026, the Minnesota Professional Educator Licensing and Standards Board (PELSB) voted to discontinue Minnesota teaching licensure eligibility for new MLC students who start pursuing an education degree in fall 2026 or later. While MLC's programs are still accredited by the Higher Learning Commission, new students will not automatically be eligible for a Tier 3 Minnesota teaching license upon graduation and may have to complete PELSB's portfolio process in order to become licensed teachers. Student enrolled prior to 2026 are not affected by this licensing eligibility change.

=== Staff ministry program ===
MLC's staff ministry program prepares students to become staff ministers for congregations in the WELS. Students in the program complete general education courses, professional courses, and practical experiences to equip them for service as staff ministers. The staff ministry program leads to a Bachelor of Science degree with a major in practical theology. Students may also choose a second major in education or parish music.

After completing all requirements, students may be assigned by the WELS to various positions in synod congregations, such as Minister of Family and Youth, Minister of Discipleship, and Minister of Christian Education.

== Campus ==
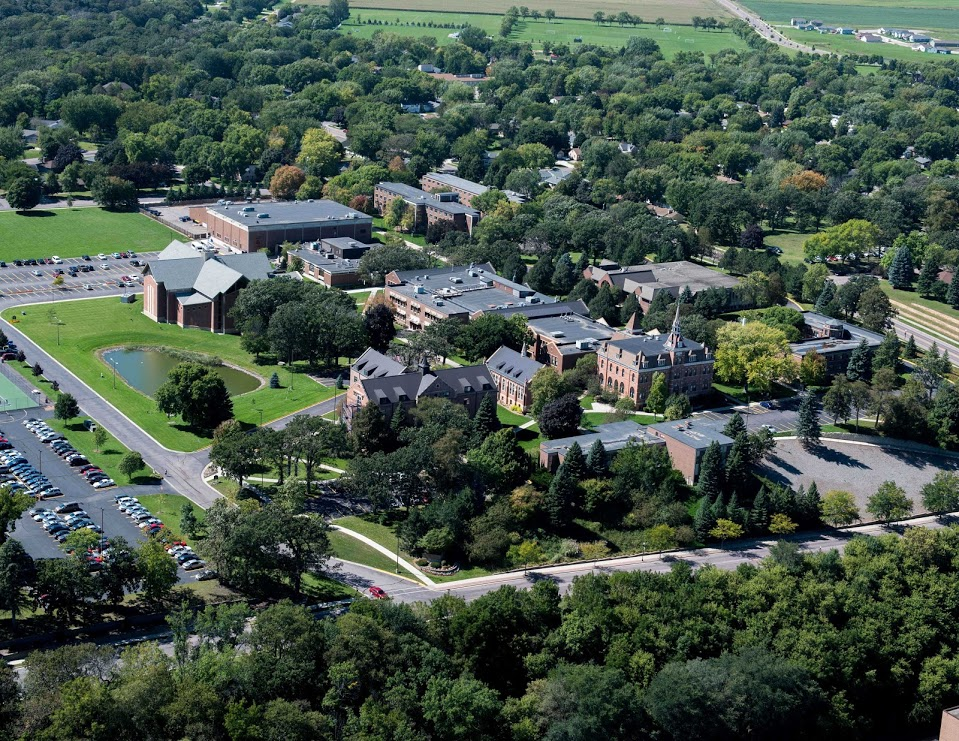
Martin Luther College in 2010

Martin Luther College is in New Ulm, Minnesota, on a wooded bluff overlooking the Minnesota River Valley. The college's 96 acres (39 ha) include its main campus, an athletic complex, and a forested property used as a natural outdoor laboratory.

The 50-acre (20 ha) main campus is at New Ulm's highest point, between Hermann Heights Monument and Flandrau State Park. Most of MLC's academic and administrative operations are within the college's Old Main, dedicated in 1884, the Wittenberg Collegiate Center, dedicated in 1928, and the Link, connecting Old Main to the Wittenberg Collegiate Center, dedicated in 1995. The Old Main was added to the National Register of Historic Places in 1979, after being nominated as a leading example of Gothic Revival architecture in Minnesota and a distinctive symbol of local religious education. The main campus also includes the Luther Student Center, Music Hall, Music Center, the 1200-seat Chapel of the Christ, a 900-seat auditorium (within the Wittenberg Collegiate Center), a gymnasium, a library, four residence halls, and several faculty homes. The college's library cooperates with the Traverse des Sioux Library System.

Martin Luther College has 17 pipe organs, including the 57-rank Schantz organ in its chapel and a 42-rank Casavant organ in its auditorium.

Along with its buildings, the main campus also has tennis courts, a football field, a softball diamond, and various athletic practice fields. Additionally, the college owns a 38-acre (15 ha) athletic complex a few blocks from the main campus. It is composed of soccer fields, a baseball diamond, and other practice facilities. The complex was dedicated in 2009 and was funded by both the college and the city of New Ulm.

== Student life ==
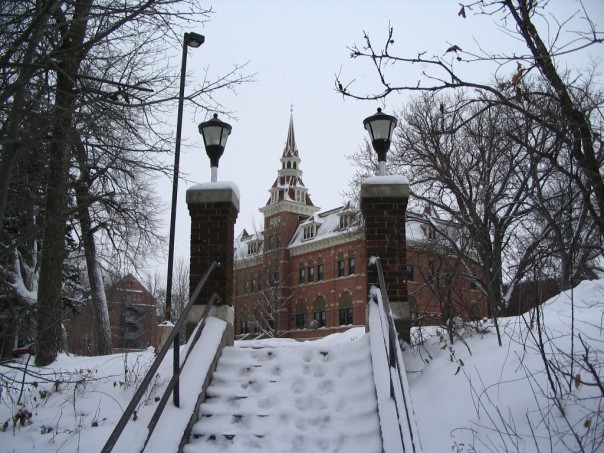
Old Main from the north

=== Student body ===
As of 2018, Martin Luther College enrolled 764 undergraduate and 128 graduate students. The undergraduate student body included students from 33 states and nine countries and was 48% female. 564 undergraduates were enrolled in MLC's education programs and 200 in its pre-seminary program. 35% of undergraduate students were alumni of the college's two preparatory schools, Luther Preparatory School in Watertown, Wisconsin, and Michigan Lutheran Seminary in Saginaw, Michigan.

=== Residential life ===
Martin Luther College generally requires its undergraduate students to live on campus. This is justified by the administration as an effort to give students a measure of community at MLC and to develop fellowship and connections beneficial to service in the WELS. As a result, 98% of undergraduates live on campus in one of four residence halls. Centennial Hall is reserved for freshmen and sophomore women, Concord Hall for freshmen and sophomore men, Augustana Hall for junior and senior women, and Summit Hall for junior and senior men. The oldest residence is Summit Hall, built in 1911.

The Luther Student Center contains the college's student union, cafeteria, fitness center, locker rooms, and gymnasium. All facilities are available to students from morning until midnight throughout the school year. MLC students have free access to the nearby New Ulm Recreation Center.

Morning and evening worship services are conducted daily during the school week in the Chapel of the Christ.

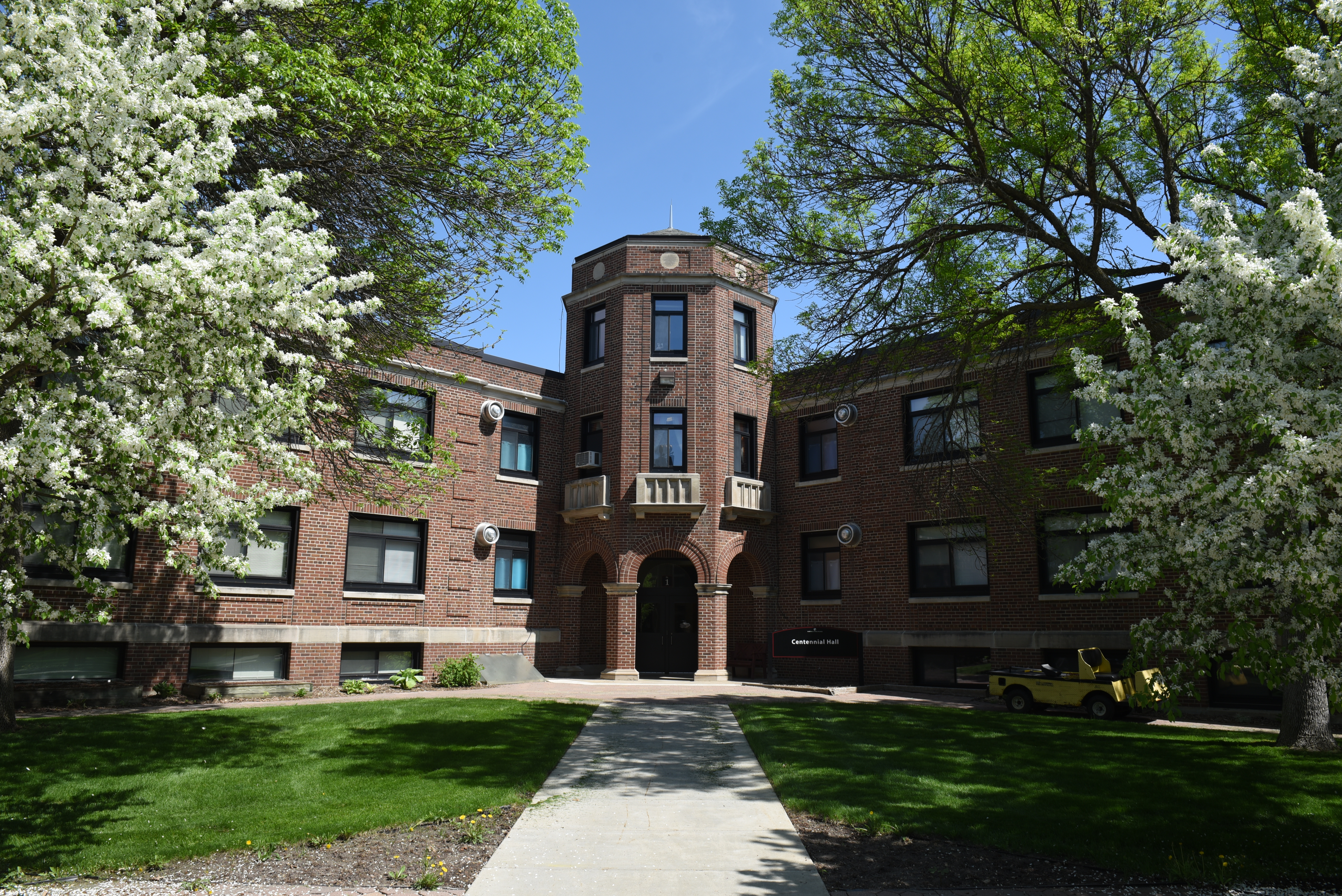
Centennial Hall

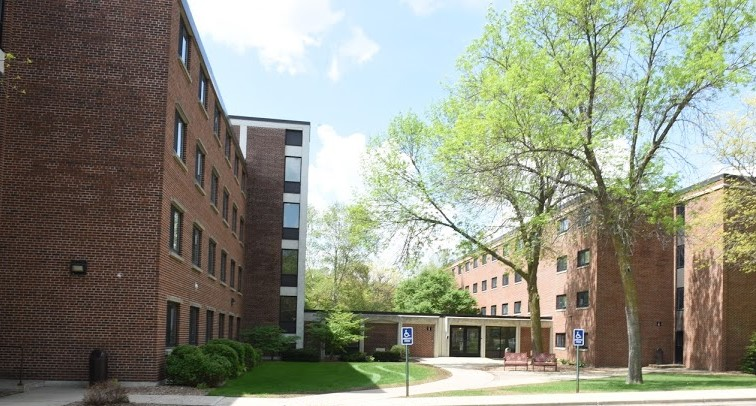
Augustana and Concord Halls

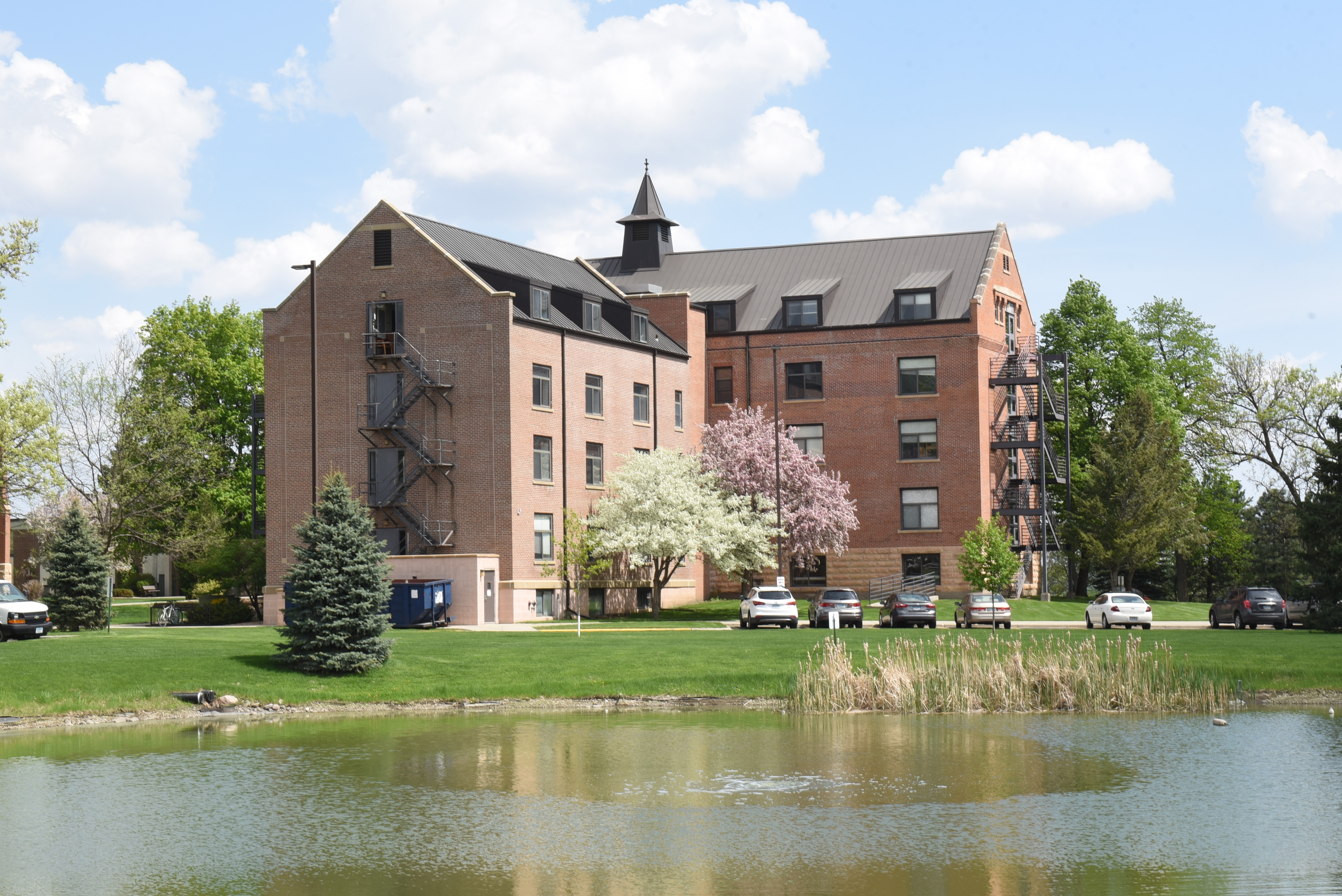
Summit Hall

=== Activities ===
==== Student organizations ====
Martin Luther College hosts approximately 20 student clubs and organizations. These include various student government, service, special interest, publication, and social organizations. The Martin Luther College Student Senate coordinates funding for most student groups, organizes campus events and projects, and represents the student body before administration.

Service organizations include Anchor, a community service group, and Jesus Cares, which ministers to people with intellectual and developmental disabilities.

Forum is a student-run theatre organization which presents four productions annually. Urban Ministry, Meet Math, and AVCO are among MLC's other special interest groups.

Martin Luther College has several student-run publications. Hilltop Happenings is a monthly newspaper for undergraduates. KnightWatch Weekly is a one-page recruitment paper sponsored by the Admissions Office. Studium Excitare is an academic journal dedicated to translating previously untranslated works of church fathers from Latin and German into English.

Student groups not sanctioned by the college include social clubs COS, led by men in the pre-seminary program, and DEX, led by men in the education programs. Each group hosts social gatherings throughout the year.

==== Music ====
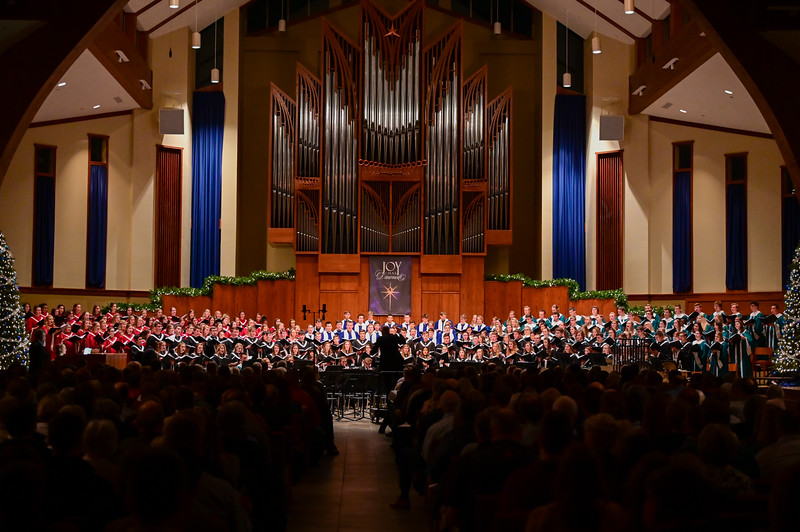
Martin Luther College hosts an annual Christmas concert in the Chapel of the Christ

Student involvement with the college's music department is extensive. MLC sponsors four choirs, including the touring College Choir, the Wind Symphony, and two handbell choirs.

Organ study at the college prepares students to serve as organists in WELS churches. Enrollment in organ lessons averages about 100 students per year. Students can perform in studio recitals, campus chapel services, concerts, and local congregations. 17 pipe organs are available on campus, including a 57-rank Schantz organ in the Chapel of the Christ and a 42-rank Casavant organ in the Wittenberg Collegiate Center.

==== Daylight ====
The Martin Luther College Daylight program offers students experiential learning at WELS congregations in the United States and abroad. Through the program, student volunteers meet congregations' requests for assistance in various outreach programs. Since 2000, almost 2500 MLC students have participated in Daylight.

== Athletics ==
Martin Luther athletics logo

About 30% of Martin Luther College students participate in a varsity sport and about 60% in intramural athletics. Martin Luther College fields 16 intercollegiate varsity teams; 8 for men, 8 for women. The college supports an additional 15 intramural leagues. The varsity teams compete in the National Collegiate Athletic Association (NCAA) Division III nine-member Upper Midwest Athletic Conference (UMAC). Men's sports include cross country, soccer, football, basketball, tennis, baseball, track and field, and golf; women's sports include cross country, soccer, volleyball, basketball, tennis, softball, track and field, and golf. In the 2017–18 school year, 9 out of 16 varsity sports led the UMAC in team grade point average.

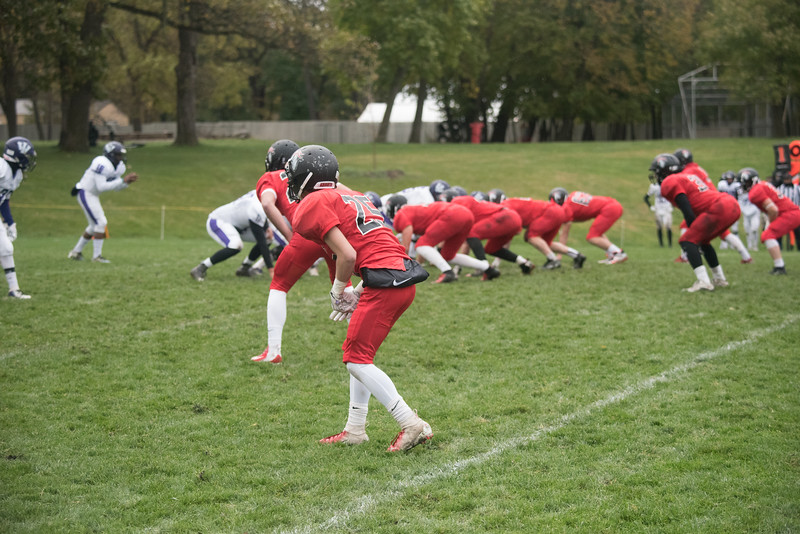
The Knights football team made Division III NCAA championship appearances in 2018 and 2019

Since 1995, Martin Luther College's teams have won 28 UMAC championships. The school's nickname is the Knights and its colors are black, red, and white.

At events during the early 2000s, students formed the Roo Crew, adopting an inflatable kangaroo as the college's unofficial mascot. The Male Cheerleaders perform humorous routines at home basketball games and interact with the student section and referees. The college has a rivalry with Bethany Lutheran College in nearby Mankato, Minnesota. Teams have played in MLC's football bowl since 1972.

MLC supports more than 15 intramural leagues. Opportunities are also available to play hockey and baseball in annual matches with Wisconsin Lutheran Seminary.

== Alumni ==
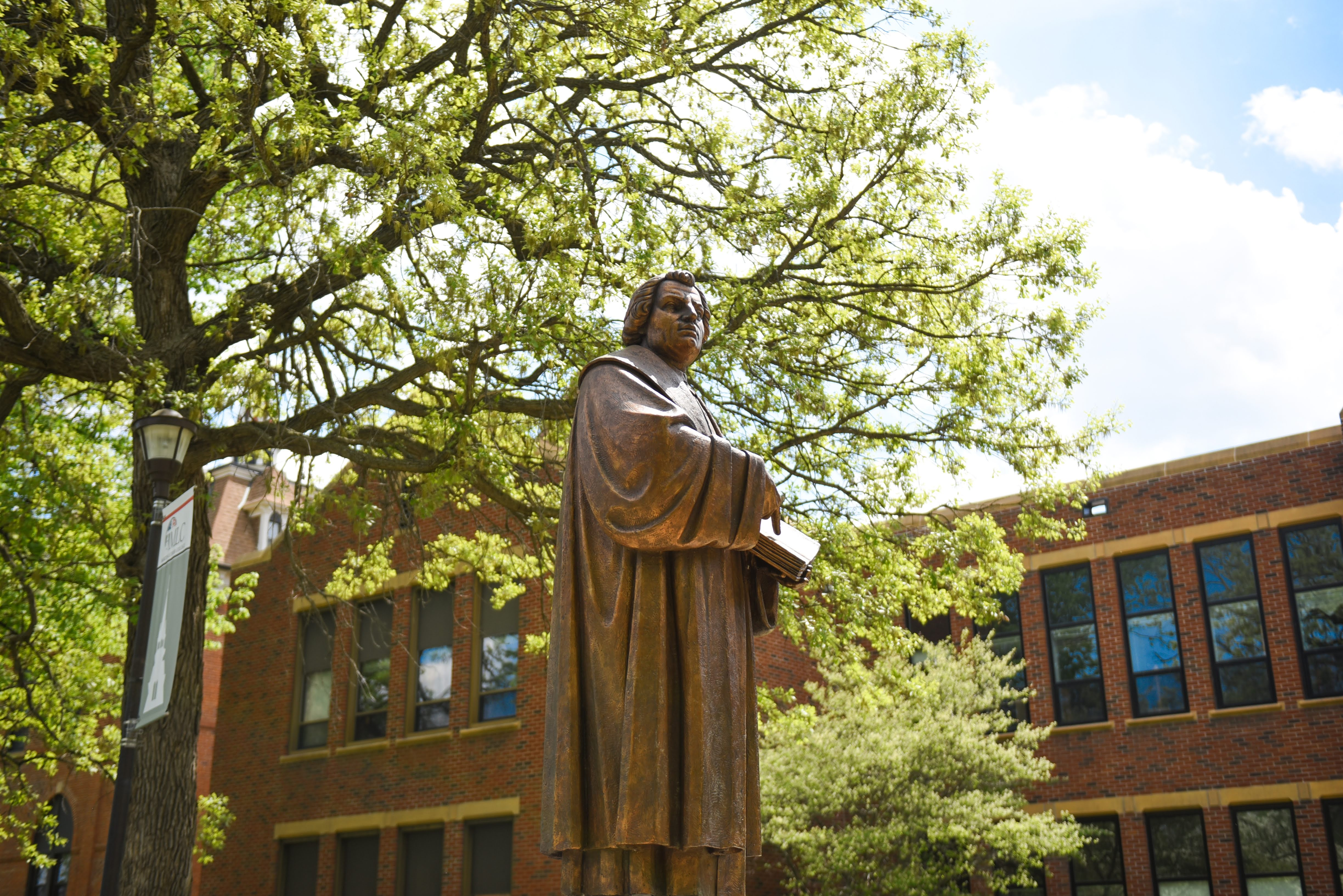
Statue of Martin Luther, Doctor of Theology

Alumni of Martin Luther College and its predecessor schools serve as pastors, missionaries, chaplains, principals, teachers, staff ministers, and church leaders for the Wisconsin Evangelical Lutheran Synod. Since 1865, alumni have comprised over 90% of the synod's called workers. Notable alumni include Northwestern College graduates John W. O. Brenner, Franz Pieper, Winfred P. Lehmann, and various theologians and leaders within the WELS.

Graduates of the college's pre-seminary program may continue their education at Wisconsin Lutheran Seminary in Mequon, Wisconsin.

Graduates of the college's education programs may become candidates for assignment to serve in elementary schools, high schools, or congregations of the WELS. The synod's leadership cooperates with the college's officers and administrators to assign candidates to their respective schools and congregations. The Wisconsin Synod is the nation's third-largest Lutheran church body and operates the nation's fourth-largest private school system.

The Martin Luther College Alumni Association (MLCAA) is an alumni association available to all graduates of Martin Luther College, Dr. Martin Luther College, Northwestern College, and Martin Luther Academy/Dr. Martin Luther High School. The MLCAA plans events, coordinates funding efforts, and offers educational and travel opportunities. The group communicates with alumni through social media, the Alumni Messenger, and InFocus, MLC's flagship publication.

== See also ==
- Higher education in Minnesota
- List of colleges and universities in Minnesota
- National Register of Historic Places listings in Brown County, Minnesota
