= Studium =

Studium is a Latin word meaning "study", "zeal", "dedication", etc. It may refer to:

- Chavagnes Studium, a center for the study of the Liberal Arts
- Medieval university, a corporation organized during the High Middle Ages
- Studium Angelopolitanum, a non-profit educational organization
- Studium Biblicum Franciscanum, a Franciscan academic society in Jerusalem
- Studium Excitare, a quarterly academic journal
- Studium generale, the customary name for a medieval university
- Studium Generale Marcianum
- Studium monastery, historically the most important monastery of Constantinople

== See also ==
- List of medieval universities
