= God's Word Is Our Great Heritage =

"God's Word Is Our Great Heritage" is the title of a popular hymn sung in many churches, especially the Lutheran Church. This hymn was inspired by Psalm 16:6: "...yea, I have a goodly heritage." KJV

== History ==
God's Word Is Our Great Heritage was written in 1817 by N. F. S. Grundtvig, a Danish Lutheran Pastor. Grundtvig wrote the hymn as the 5th verse to Martin Luther's Ein feste Burg. The hymn was translated into English by Ole Gulbrand Belsheim in 1909. In 1916, Friedrich Otto Reuter, then a professor at Dr. Martin Luther College, put the hymn to a tune of his creation. Many hymnals use this arrangement, including The Lutheran Hymnal, Lutheran Service Book (LCMS) and Christian Worship: A Lutheran Hymnal (WELS), though the Evangelical Lutheran Hymnary (ELS) has retained the original melody to the hymn. The hymn is also the school hymn of Michigan Lutheran Seminary.

== Text ==
Original Danish: Guds ord det er vort arvegods, det skal vort afkoms være; Gud, giv os i vor grav den ros, vi holdt det højt i ære! Det er vor hjælp i nød, vor trøst i liv og død, o Gud, ihvor det går, lad dog, mens verden står, det i vor æt nedarves!	English: God's Word is our great heritage And shall be ours forever; To spread its light from age to age Shall be our chief endeavor. Through life it guides our way, In death it is our stay. Lord, grant while worlds endure, We keep its teachings pure Throughout all generations.
