= John W. O. Brenner =

American Lutheran minister (1874–1962)

John W.O. Brenner
- Born: July 11, 1874; Hustisford, Wisconsin
- Died: September 30, 1962 (aged 88); Bay City, Michigan
- Occupations: Pastor and theologian
- Spouse: Anna Raether
- Children: John F., Dorothy

Rev. John William Otto Brenner (July 11, 1874 – September 30, 1962) was an American Lutheran minister who served as president of the Wisconsin Evangelical Lutheran Synod from 1933 to 1953.

Benner was born in Hustisford, Wisconsin. In 1896, he graduated from Wisconsin Lutheran Seminary in Mequon, Wisconsin. He served as pastor of Saint John's Evangelical Lutheran Church in Milwaukee, Wisconsin, until 1958. He served on the board of Northwestern College in Watertown, Wisconsin, and of Wisconsin Lutheran Seminary.
