= Campion High School =

Jesuit boarding school in Wisconsin, US

- Prairie du Chien, Wisconsin

Information
- Type: Jesuit, Catholic
- Established: 1880
- Status: Closed in 1975
- Gender: All boy
- Website: Campion

Campion Jesuit High School was a Jesuit boarding school for boys in Prairie du Chien, Wisconsin, named for the Jesuit martyr Edmund Campion. The school operated from its founding in 1880 until closing in 1975, and educated several notable figures during its existence. The former school's campus now houses a prison operated by the state of Wisconsin Department of Corrections. The school operated independently of the Roman Catholic Diocese of La Crosse.

== History ==
Campion High School was founded in 1880 as the College of the Sacred Heart. Established on property donated by Prairie du Chien philanthropist John Lawler, the school was originally operated as a college by Jesuits from the Buffalo, New York, mission of the German Province of the Society of Jesus. Its first president was Rev. William Becker, S.J. The school continued as a college until 1888, when it was closed to lay students and became a house of formation for Jesuit priests. Ten years later, in 1898, the school was reopened to the public, as both a high school and college.

In 1907, the Buffalo Mission of the German Province of the Society of Jesus was disbanded, and the College of the Sacred Heart was reorganized into the Missouri Province of the Society of Jesus. Shortly afterward, in 1913, the school was renamed the Campion College of the Sacred Heart. As the name change took place, the school underwent an early expansion phase that saw the construction of several buildings for academic and housing purposes. Then, in 1925, the school's college division was phased out and the institution became known simply as Campion Jesuit High School and was operated as a boy's boarding school. The high school quickly gained a reputation in both academics and athletics, and attracted students from across the nation. The school continued its growth until the mid-1960s, when the enrollment peaked at just below 600 students.

On Saturday, December 14, 1968, a large fire destroyed Campion's Kostka Hall, a building which housed the school's administration center as well as a theater, coffee house, dance hall, student radio station and other student recreational spaces. The fire, which began on the fourth floor, spread slowly and allowed for the building to be safely evacuated without any personal injuries. School records and other important documents were also removed before the fire became uncontrollable, and although the building was a complete loss, the school remained open and recovered quickly. Still, the fire was only one of several problems that the school had to face as it moved towards the 1970s. Not only was the school's enrollment declining dramatically, but the number of Jesuit priests available to operate the school was falling. In addition, ideological differences at the school led to conflicts between liberal and conservative staff members about the school's academic direction as well as its disciplinary and enrollment policies. Meanwhile, students began to rebel in various ways and racial tensions between white and African American students flared after the publication of a poem in a 1969 school newspaper that contained remarks many found to be obscene, racist, and offensive. Matters grew worse in 1972, when a Wisconsin law went into effect that allowed anyone above the age of 18 to purchase and consume alcohol, aggravating a drug problem on the campus. Parents upset at the situation at Campion began to consider alternative schools for their children, and discontented staff members began to resign. Financial difficulties only made matters worse, and in 1975 the school announced that it was closing.

Following Campion's closure, the 108-acre (0.44 km^{2}) campus was sold to the Wisconsin Evangelical Lutheran Synod for $2,800,000 and became home to the new Martin Luther Preparatory School, another boarding school for training boys and girls for the Ministry. This institution opened in 1979 and continued until 1995, when it was moved to Watertown, Wisconsin and consolidated with Northwestern Preparatory School to become Luther Preparatory School. In 1995, the Prairie du Chien campus was sold to the state of Wisconsin and transformed into a juvenile prison. Today the prison, called the Prairie du Chien Correctional Institution, serves as a minimum security adult penitentiary. One building that was formerly part of the Campion High School campus, the sports complex at Hoffman Hall, remains outside of the prison and is operated as a public recreational facility by the city of Prairie du Chien.

== Notable alumni ==
List of alumni

- George Blaha, sportscaster
- Pat Bowlen, owner of the Denver Broncos
- David Doyle, actor
- Vicente Fox, president of Mexico (2000–2006)
- Walter Halloran, Jesuit priest
- John Henebry, United States Air Force General
- Jack Horkheimer, astronomy
- Erich Hoyt, author
- Harvey C. Jewett IV, South Dakota Board of Regents
- Patrick Lucey, Governor of Wisconsin (1971–1977)
- Kevin McCarthy, actor
- William Joseph McDonough, diplomat, banker, president of the Federal Reserve Bank of New York
- Robert F. McPartlin, Illinois state representative, convicted of bribery
- Gregory Miller, real estate developer
- Adolph John Paschang, American bishop who served in China
- John Powers, NFL player, Pittsburgh Steelers, Minnesota Vikings
- Leo Ryan, Congressman from California (1973–1978)
- Paul Scherrman, Iowa state legislator and businessman
- Keith Szarabajka, actor
- John Touhy, Illinois politician
- Dick Tuck, politician
- Jerry Vainisi, businessman and football executive
- George Wendt, actor
- Calder Willingham, Chattanooga businessman, triathlete, ALS victim
- Garry Wills, author

== See also ==
- Diocese of La Crosse
