= Paul Scherrman =

American politician and businessman

Member of the Iowa House of Representatives from the 33rd district
- In office January 13, 1997 – January 12, 2003

Personal details
- Born: August 27, 1948 (age 77) Farley, Iowa, US
- Party: Democratic
- Spouse: Eileen Gerber
- Children: 4
- Occupation: Businessman

Paul J. Scherrman (born August 27, 1948) is an American politician and businessman in the state of Iowa.

Schermann was born in Prairie du Chien, Wisconsin and attended Campion High School in Prairie du Chien, Wisconsin. He then went to St. Mary's University of Minnesota in Winona, Minnesota. He was vice-president of J. P. Scherrman, Inc. in Dubuque, Iowa. A Democrat, he represented the 33rd district in the Iowa House of Representatives from 1997 to 2003.
