= Studium Excitare =

Academic journal

Studium Excitare is an academic journal dedicated to the translation of confessional Lutheran writings, focusing on the teaching of the Wisconsin Evangelical Lutheran Synod. Studium Excitare is published by students and alumni of the confessional language (German and Latin) programs at Martin Luther College in New Ulm, Minnesota, along with contributions from students at Wisconsin Lutheran Seminary in Mequon, Wisconsin.

== History ==
In 2003, a small group of students at Martin Luther College decided to form a publication in which they could publish articles about Lutheran doctrine. After two such issues, the focus of the journal was shifted exclusively to the translation of German and Latin writings.

The original editors wanted the journal to continue to serve the campus even after their graduation. As a result of their efforts, the college adopted the publication as the official journal of the confessional language studies at MLC.

The journal began a hiatus in 2011 when the then-current editors graduated. In 2018, a group of students resumed publication.

== Title ==
Studium Excitare is a Latin phrase that means "to arouse zeal." The phrase is often used in historic Lutheran writings. The title reflects the journal's mission to motivate current and future students, as well as alumni, to use their academic language skills for ongoing study and research.

== Sources ==
- Transition to Translation
- Studium Excitare--Changed and Unchanged
- An Introduction to Studium Excitare
- A Brief History of Studium
