= Loyola College Prep =

Location
- 921 Jordan Street; Shreveport, (Caddo Parish), Louisiana 71101; United States; 32°29′52″N 93°44′59″W

Information
- Type: Private
- Motto: Men and Women for Others
- Religious affiliation: Roman Catholic
- Denomination: Catholic
- Patron saints: St. Ignatius Loyola, SJ
- Opened: 1902 (as St John’s); 1982 (as Loyola)
- Founder: Rev. John Francis O'Connor, S.J.
- Superintendent: Sr. Carol Shively, O.S.U
- President: Dr. Rick Michael '89
- Chairperson: Bishop Francis I. Malone
- Director: Jessica Ray
- Principal: Dr. Laurie Salvail
- Head teacher: Mike Mawhinney
- Chaplain: Fr. Rainey Johnson
- Faculty: 39
- Grades: 9–12
- Gender: Coeducational
- Average class size: 17
- Student to teacher ratio: 10:1
- Colors: Navy Blue, White and Columbia Blue
- Mascot: Snoopy
- Nickname: Flyers
- Team name: Flyers
- Accreditation: Southern Association of Colleges and Schools
- USNWR ranking: 5
- National ranking: 1
- Yearbook: The Flight
- Tuition: $11,100
- Revenue: $181,000
- Admissions Director: Andy Cline
- Athletic Director: Ben Schonfarber
- Website: www.loyolaprep.org

Loyola College Prep is a private Catholic coeducational high school in Shreveport, Louisiana, founded by the Society of Jesus (Jesuits), but now operated by the Roman Catholic Diocese of Shreveport. It is among the oldest functioning former Jesuit high schools in the United States.

== History and Jesuit Origins ==
Originally a high school for boys, St. John Berchmans College opened on November 3, 1902, by the Rev. John Francis O'Connor, S.J. (1848 - 1911), of the New Orleans Province of the Society of Jesus (Jesuits). At that time, high school classes and the first two years of college were offered. O'Connor was invited by Bishop Anthony Durier of the Diocese of Natchitoches to establish a new church and a high school for boys in Shreveport. The school was first located at 1564 Texas Avenue (see 1909 Sanborn Fire Insurance map (lower right corner)), and moved to its present location on Jordan Street in 1929. The school was housed in various buildings on Jordan Street until it moved into the present building (at 921 Jordan), constructed partly in 1938 and completed in 1949. In 1941, the name changed to St. John's High School. It was a full-time military school during the World War II years. In order to bolster awareness of its independence from the grade school and Catholic Parish of the same name, as well as to honor the long-standing service of the Jesuits, the number of which peaked at the school in the 1950s, St John's name was changed in 1960 to Jesuit High School of Shreveport while Rev. Charles A. Leininger, S.J. (1924 - 2018), was principal. Leininger served in that role from 1955 to 1965.

By the mid-1960s there was a growing concern among the Jesuits over the falling number of recruits to the Order. Consequently, the New Orleans Province couldn’t expect to continue fully staffing all its Jesuit schools with priests in the future. The only way to keep the schools open was to hire more lay teachers. In 1969, the Jesuits announced that due to these manpower shortages as well as financial struggles, Jesuit High School in Shreveport would close the following year. The driving forces for keeping the school alive during this period were largely provided by a small group of local Catholic lay men and women, as well as clergy. The Jesuit High School of Shreveport Corporation was formed, which negotiated a plan that contractually allowed the Jesuits to maintain academic and religious oversight of the school while a newly established board of trustees, presided over until 1977 by J. Robert Welsh and subsequently by Carmody, took over fiduciary responsibility, taking ownership of the land, buildings, and furnishings, and thereby assuming the school's debt.

=== 1971 to present ===
In 1971, Rev. Thomas H. Clancy, S.J. (1923 - 2009), the Provincial Superior of the New Orleans Province, officially notified the Shreveport school that it would no longer have a Jesuit as principal once the current contract expired, although it did have a Jesuit president/rector and a small number of Jesuit faculty members for the next decade. The last Jesuit principal of the school was Rev. Roy E. Schilling, S.J. (1928 - 1974), serving from 1965 to 1972, while the last Jesuit president was Rev. Ernest “E.J.” Jacques (1934 - 2014), who served in that role into the 1980s.

By 1972, the board of trustees at the Shreveport school had expanded responsibilities including administrative aspects of the school and hired its first lay principal, Robert Henry Ernst (1921 - 2015), who served in this capacity for 13 years until his retirement in 1985. His tenure remains the longest by any principal in the school's history. Ernst was very carefully selected. He was a veteran Catholic educator who had begun his career as a teacher in the Midwestern United States in 1944, becoming a principal for the first time at a Catholic high school in St. Louis, Missouri, in 1957. His entire career was spent in parochial schools. At Jesuit, Ernst was highly respected by the governing board of trustees, as well as the faculty and staff. Under his incumbency, a number of noteworthy changes took place. He is remembered for implementing the SQ3R reading comprehension method in the 1970s. The school began offering Advanced Placement courses (AP) in 1981-82, to give its students an opportunity to receive college credit while in high school. Finally, it was during the Ernst years that the Society of Jesus ultimately relinquished all control of the school in 1982 to the board of trustees. That is when the school took on its present name, Loyola College Prep, in recognition of Ignatius of Loyola, the founder of the Jesuits. In 1984, Ernst was awarded Key to the City of Shreveport.

Girls were admitted to Loyola for the first time in 1987, in an attempt to circumvent the dwindling student enrollment that had been occurring since 1980 from a downturn in the local economy. St. Vincent's Academy, a local Catholic high school for girls founded in 1868 by the Order of the Daughters of the Cross, was approached by Loyola in 1986 about the possibly of a merger, but they declined the offer to further conduct serious discussions. St Vincent's had also been experiencing financial difficulties of its own and, as a result, closed in 1988. Although each school was wholly autonomous in an administrative, fiduciary, and academic sense, by the later years of their coexistence, Loyola and St Vincent's had come to be informally regarded by many members of the community as more-or-less partner schools because they often participated in joint extracurricular activities in a manner that seemed to emulate a coeducational institution. For example, the girl cheerleaders at Jesuit High School football games were St. Vincent's students, who wore uniforms with the Jesuit team colors of blue and white. This spirit of unity or association was further evident in their choices of school mascots. Since 1966, Loyola's has been Snoopy while St. Vincent's was Woodstock, sidekicks from the Peanuts comic strip.

In 2005, Loyola temporarily admitted nearly 200 displaced students from several Catholic high schools damaged by Hurricane Katrina in south Louisiana.

== Faculty ==
A number of faculty and staff throughout the school's history have served forty or more consecutive years. The current faculty member with the longest continuous service is Mike Mawhinney, who as of 2026 has taught and coached at the school since 1976, or 50 years. This ties with the tenure of Gerald W. Johnson for the longest tenure of any faculty or staff member in the school's history. Johnson's service began in 1963 and ended with his retirement in 2009. Johnson was a mathematics and physics instructor who also served as Prefect of Discipline, assistant principal, and as principal from 1986 to 1989. The previous record of 45 years was held by physical science teacher Frank J. Cicero (1926 - 2018), who joined the school in 1950 and retired in 1995. Cicero also coached football for 16 years and baseball for 27 years, over which time he compiled a 270-172-4 record, including six district championships, state runner-up (1957), and two state championships (1964 and 1974). The current Flyer baseball field is named Frank Cicero Field in his honor and Warrington Place, the street adjacent to the school campus on the east side, was renamed Cicero Street in 1996, the year after his retirement. Cicero is the only faculty member to have taught at the school under all three of its names, St. John's, Jesuit, and Loyola.

Every member of the current faculty holds a college degree and is certified, while 40% hold a Master's degree or beyond.

== Facilities ==
The major structures on the Jordan Street campus are a three level classroom building constructed in two phases - the first (western) half of the high school, including a cafeteria and chemistry laboratory, was completed in 1938, and the second (eastern) half, including a library and physics laboratory, was completed in 1949; a four level classroom building that opened in 1929 as a residence hall for Jesuit priests; a gymnasium (built in 1952 and extensively renovated in 2011, it is the oldest school gymnasium in the city) including boys' dressing rooms; a girls' dressing room building (1987); a new cafeteria building (2012); and the single story Anderson building used for various administrative offices.

The 24-acre (97,000 m^{2}) Loyola Athletic Complex opened in 2002. It is located on Clyde Fant Memorial Parkway and includes Messmer Stadium (football, soccer and lacrosse), Cicero Field (baseball), St. Vincent’s Field (softball) and the Flyer Field House.

== Academics ==
Loyola announced in 2008 that eight juniors were named as National Merit Scholars, the highest number in the school's history. Ten students won awards (including three first-place awards) at the 2008 Louisiana State Rally held April 19 at Louisiana State University in Baton Rouge.

Loyola won the Sweepstakes Award for Division III schools participating in the 2007 Northwest Louisiana High School Literary Rally, held at Northwestern State University on March 32. Eleven students won awards (including two first-place awards) at the Louisiana State Rally held April 21 at Louisiana State University in Baton Rouge.

Loyola was named on the Acton Institute's first Catholic High School Honor Roll (2004). Membership is limited to the top 50 Catholic schools in the United States. This honor roll recognizes those schools that best maintain high academic standards, uphold their Catholic identities, and prepare students to actively engage the world.

Loyola graduation requirements include the completion of 100 hours of community service with an approved non-profit organization or project dedicated to helping individuals with special needs.

Regular student print publications are the newspaper, The Flyer, and the annual yearbook, Flight. The communications office produces the electronic E-Flyer and ParentFlyer.

== Athletics ==
Loyola College Prep athletics competes in the LHSAA.

=== Athletics history ===
Athletic teams are known as the Flyers and the mascot is Snoopy from the Peanuts comic strip by Charles M. Schulz. Jesuit High School in Shreveport received permission in 1966 by Schulz to use Snoopy as its mascot and Loyola College Prep remains the only school so honored. The school's athletic teams were originally known as the Orioles, but were renamed the Flyers in 1937 to honor the influence of Barksdale Field (now, Barksdale Air Force Base) on the local community. Although Barksdale is located in Bossier Parish, Louisiana, the citizens of Shreveport annexed the unincorporated land and donated it to the U. S. government, in fulfillment of a pledge made to procure the government's commitment to build the facility in the region.

The school has won state championships in the LHSAA in a multitude of sports [see below].

=== Championships ===
As of 2025:

Baseball championships

- (9) State Championships: 1961,1962,1963,1964,1968,1972,1974, 1981

Football championships

- (3) State Championships: 1967, 1976, 1994

Girls basketball championships

- (2) State Championships: 2001, 2012

Golf championships

- (7) State Championships: 1975, 1979, 1988, 1989, 1996, 2011, 2012,

Soccer championships

- (4) State Championships: 1996, 2019, 2022, 2022, 2025, 2025, 2026, 2026

Softball championships

- (1) State Championships: 1996

Tennis championships

- (13) State Championships: 1978, 1979, 1980, 1981, 1982, 2002, 2010, 2011, 2012, 2013, 2017, 2018, 2018

== Notable alumni ==
Edward F. Neild, Jr.	1926	Local architect who designed the Hirsch Memorial Coliseum in Shreveport	
John William Corrington	expelled in his junior year (1949)	Creator/screenwriter of several television programs	
Tony Sardisco	1952	Professional Football Player - San Francisco 49ers, Washington Redskins, Boston Patriots	x
H. Alston Johnson III	1963	Former federal judicial nominee to the U.S. Court of Appeals for the Fifth Circuit	x
Michael C. Burda	1977	American macroeconomist and professor at the Humboldt University of Berlin.	,
Jim Wells	1978	University of Alabama head baseball coach	x
Billy Thomas	1994	Professional Basketball Player - New Jersey Nets	
Jon Alston	2001	Professional Football Player - Tampa Bay Buccaneers; American screenwriter, director, producer	
Art Carmody	2003	College Football Player - Louisville Cardinals. 2006 Lou Groza Award Winner	

== Historic seals ==

The two wolves and cauldron in the first two seals are from St. Ignatius Loyola's family crest and symbolizes generosity, having enough to give to the wolves. The pelican feeding its young with her own blood is an ancient symbol of Christianity (Christ feeding the Church with his body and blood through the Eucharist).
