= Jon Alston =

Film director, screenwriter, producer, and former American football player (born 1983)

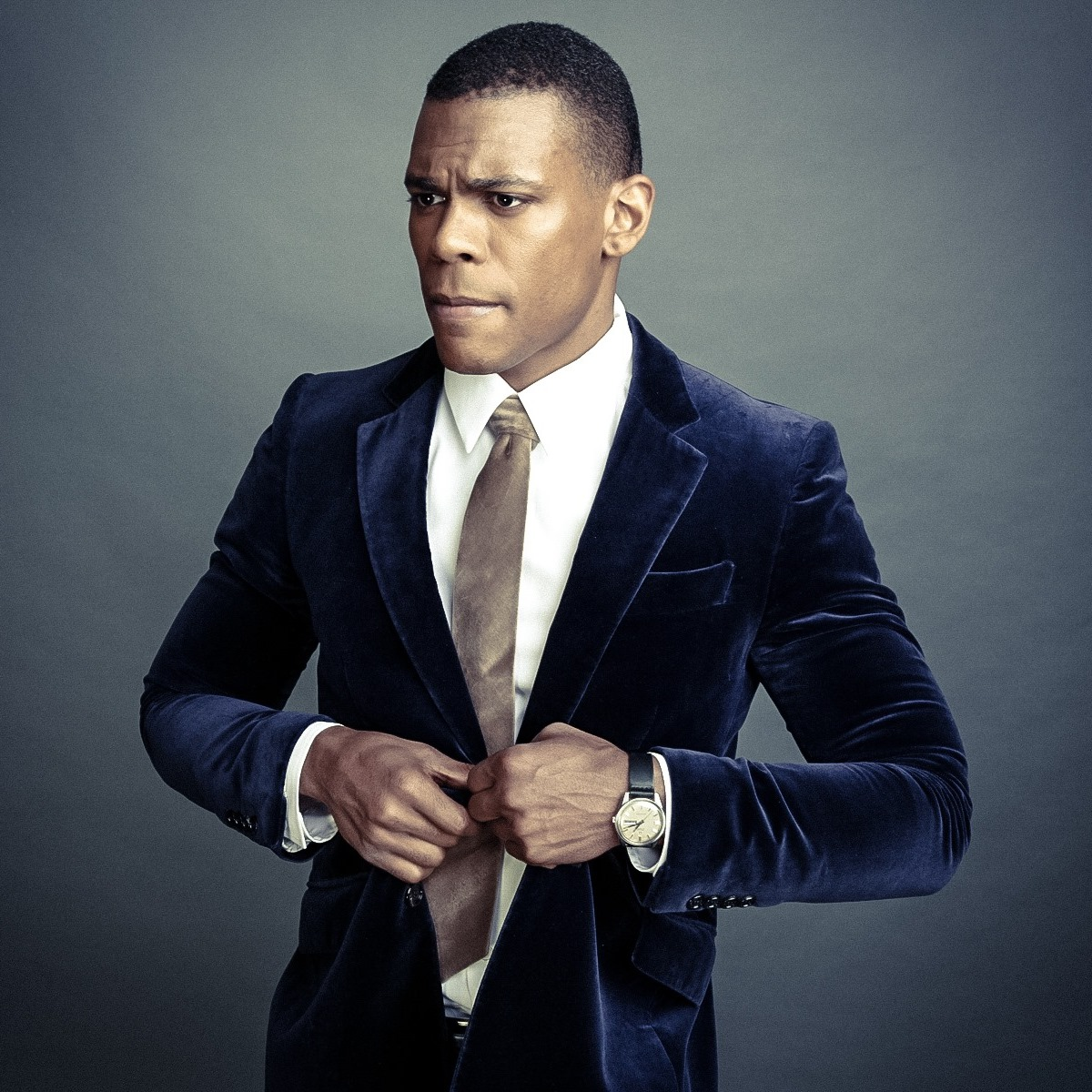
- Born: Jonhenri Alston II; June 4, 1983 (age 43); Monroe, Louisiana, U.S.
- Occupations: Film director, screenwriter, film producer, Professional Athlete 2006-2011
- Years active: 2011–present
- Website: jonalston.com

Jonhenri Alston II (born June 4, 1983) is an American screenwriter, director, producer and former professional football player. He played as a linebacker in the National Football League (NFL). He has written and produced on critically acclaimed shows such as S.W.A.T. and All American. His first feature-length film, Red Butterfly, debuted at the 23rd Annual St. Louis International Film Festival. His sophomore film, Augustus, has received 24 wins and five nominations since its debut in 2020, notably winning the Directorial Discovery Grand Prize at the Rhode Island International Film Festival.

Prior to filmmaking, Alston earned a football scholarship to Stanford University which led to a career in the NFL. He was selected by the St. Louis Rams in the third round of the 2006 NFL draft. Alston was also a member of the Oakland Raiders and Tampa Bay Buccaneers; he retired in 2011.

Alston later graduated from Stanford with a degree in Film and Media Studies before matriculating at USC's School of Cinematic Arts.

== Early life ==
Alston grew up in Bastrop, Louisiana, but moved to Shreveport, Louisiana shortly before high school. He first played organized football in his freshman year of high school at Loyola College Prep. He earned All-District honors in his sophomore, junior year, and All-State his senior year. As a linebacker, Alston registered 134 tackles and 21 stops for losses in his senior season. He played free safety, middle linebacker and tight end as a sophomore and started at running back as a freshman

== Football career ==
Jon Alston
No. 57, 94, 55
- Position: Linebacker

Personal information
- Listed height: 6 ft 0 in (1.83 m)
- Listed weight: 235 lb (107 kg)

Career information
- High school: Loyola (Shreveport)
- College: Stanford
- NFL draft: 2006: 3rd round, 77th overall pick

Career history
- St. Louis Rams (2006); Oakland Raiders (2007–2009); Tampa Bay Buccaneers (2010)

Awards and highlights
- Second-team All-Pac-10 (2004)

Career NFL statistics
- Games played: 39
- Total tackles: 66
- Forced fumbles: 2
- Fumble recoveries: 1
- Pass deflections: 1
- Stats at Pro Football Reference

=== College career ===
Alston went on to play college football for the Stanford Cardinal. In 43 games with the Cardinal, Alston started 27 times. He finished his career with 164 tackles (94 solos), 21 sacks and 29.5 stops for losses.

=== Professional career ===
==== Pre-draft ====
Pre-draft measurables
Height	Weight	Arm length	Hand span	40-yard dash	10-yard split	20-yard split	20-yard shuttle	Three-cone drill	Vertical jump	Broad jump	Bench press
6 ft 0 3/4 in (1.85 m)	223 lb (101 kg)	31 1/2 in (0.80 m)	8 3/8 in (0.21 m)	4.40 s	1.54 s	2.57 s	4.13 s	6.90 s	40 in (1.02 m)	11 ft 0 in (3.35 m)	30 reps
All values from NFL Combine

==== St. Louis Rams ====
Alston was selected in the third round (77th overall) of the 2006 NFL draft by the St. Louis Rams. In 2006, he made 2 special teams tackles for the Rams. On September 1, 2007, he was released by the Rams.

==== Oakland Raiders ====
On September 3, 2007, Alston was signed to the Oakland Raiders' practice squad. He was then promoted to the active roster after Travis Taylor was released. He played in 13 games in the 2007 season for the Raiders, recording 8 tackles and 1 forced fumble.

On March 27, 2008, Alston was re-signed as an exclusive rights free agent by the Raiders for the 2008 season. After linebacker Robert Thomas was waived/injured on September 2, Alston switched from No. 94 to Thomas' No. 55. Thomas was then re-signed by the Raiders weeks later. On October 19, 2008, in a game against the New York Jets, the Raiders were forced to punt on a 3 and out. However, longsnapper Jon Condo directly snapped the ball to Alston, who ran it for 22 yards on a fake punt play. In 2008, Alston led the Raiders in special teams tackles with 20 despite missing two games and starting 4 games at OLB. He ended the season with 34 total tackles and 1 pass defensed. Against the Chargers, Alston garnered a career-high of 11 total tackles including 9 on defense and 2 on special teams.

Alston suffered a concussion and was placed on Injured Reserve on November 25, 2009.

==== Tampa Bay Buccaneers ====
On March 12, 2010, Alston signed with the Tampa Bay Buccaneers. Alston retired from the sport in 2011.

== Film career ==
Alston's first film, Red Butterfly was independently produced. Alston cites the works of Carl Jung and Joseph Campbell as influences on the film. Red Butterfly is a postmodern romantic tragedy in the style of Baz Luhrmann's Romeo and Juliet and Darren Aronofsky's Requiem for a Dream.

Alston's sophomore film, Augustus, won the Directorial Discovery Grand Prize at the Rhode Island International Film Festival in addition to being awarded the distinction of Best Director at multiple festivals in 2020.

== Awards and nominations ==
=== Film ===
Augustus
Year	Festival	Award	Result
2020	A Show For A Change Film Festival	Storytelling Award	Winner
2020	NYC Web Fest	Outstanding Achievement in Writing	Winner
2020	Martha's Vineyard African American Film Festival	Best Short	Nominee
2020	Rhode Island International Film Festival	Directorial Discovery Award	Winner
2020	St. Louis Filmmakers Showcase	Best Experimental Film (Jury Award)	Winner
2020	St. Louis Filmmakers Showcase	Best Experimental Film (Audience Award)	Winner
2020	St. Louis Filmmakers Showcase	Best Director (Experimental)	Winner
2020	St. Louis Filmmakers Showcase	Best Editing	Winner
2020	St. Louis Filmmakers Showcase	Best Cinematography	Winner
2020	St. Louis Filmmakers Showcase	The Essy Award for Best Showcase Film	Winner
2020	St. Louis Filmmakers Showcase	St. Louis International Film Fest Selection	Winner
2021	Anthem Awards	Human & Civil Rights Awareness Categories - Special Projects Award	Winner
2021	Anthem Awards	Diversity, Equity, & Inclusion Awareness Categories - Special Projects Award	Winner
2021	Blackbird Film Festival	Cinema Director Award (Short)	Winner
2021	Denton Black Film Festival	Best Narrative Short	Winner
2021	Denton Black Film Festival	Best of Festival	Winner
2021	Julien Dubuque International Film Festival	Best Short	Winner
2021	NewFilmmakers Los Angeles	Best Short Film, Drama	Nominee
2021	NewFilmmakers Los Angeles	Best Cinematography	Nominee
2021	NewFilmmakers Los Angeles	Best Actor, Drama	Nominee
2021	Santa Fe Film Festival	Best Short Film	Winner
2021	Telly Awards (Gold)	Branded Content Craft-Videography / Cinematography	Winner
2021	Telly Awards (Silver)	Social Video General-Social Impact	Winner
2021	Telly Awards (Silver)	Social Video General-Public Service & Activism	Winner
2021	Telly Awards (Silver)	Branded Content General-Documentary: Individual	Winner
2021	Telly Awards (Silver)	Branded Content Craft-Directing	Winner
2022	Blackbird Film Festival	Black Stories, Black Voices (Audience Award)	Winner
2022	Portland Film Festival	Best Short Film	Winner

=== Screenwriting ===
Alston's first feature-length screenplay, based on an eponymous Oscar nominated short-doc, was one of three selections to win the Atlanta Film Festival Screenplay Competition in 2022. Prior to this, he and his co-writer won the Missouri Stories Scriptwriting fellowship in 2020.

His first hour-long pilot was a finalist in 11 screenwriting competitions between 2021 and 2022. Festivals include ScreenCraft TV Pilot Script Competition, PAGE International Screenwriting Awards Competition, Launch Pad Pilot Competition and HollyShorts Screenwriting Competition among others. The project is also listed in the top 1% of Discoverable Projects on Coverfly.
