= List of former Jesuit secondary schools in the United States =

Name of Former Jesuit Secondary School	Location (City, State)	Year founded by Jesuits	Year closed/Relinquished by Jesuits	Status	Current name	Notes
Jesuit High School	Shreveport LA	1902	1982	Open	Loyola College Prep	Relinquished control to Diocese of Alexandria-Shreveport.
Cranwell Preparatory School	Lenox MA	1939	1975	Closed	---	
Brooklyn Preparatory School	Brooklyn NY	1908	1972	Closed	---	
Marquette High School	Yakima WA	1909	1968	Closed	---	Merged with two other schools to become Carroll High School, which closed in 1986.
Campion High School	Prairie du Chien WI	1880	1975	Closed	---	
Jesuit High School	El Paso TX	1926	1972	Closed	---	
St. Joseph's College	St. Paul OR	1843	1849	Closed	---	---
Bishop's Latin School	Pittsburgh PA	1961	1973	Closed	---	---
Bishop Connolly High School	Fall River MA	1967	1995	Open	---	Relinquished control to Diocese of Fall River, 1995.

== See also ==
- List of Jesuit sites
