= Martin Luther Preparatory School =

Coordinates: 43°01′57″N 91°08′28″W

Martin Luther Preparatory School (MLPS) was a college-preparatory school of the Wisconsin Evangelical Lutheran Synod in Prairie du Chien, Wisconsin. It was created in 1979 by the merger of Northwestern Lutheran Academy of Mobridge, South Dakota, and Martin Luther Academy of New Ulm, Minnesota. In 1995, MLPS was moved to the campus of Northwestern Preparatory School in Watertown, Wisconsin. The combined school is now known as Luther Preparatory School.

MLPS was located on the former campus of Campion High School, a Jesuit preparatory school that closed in 1975. The campus is now the site of the Prairie Du Chien Correctional Institution.
