= Wisconsin Lutheran Seminary =

Private Lutheran seminary in Mequon, Wisconsin, United States

Coordinates: 43°14′01″N 87°59′30″W

- Type: Private seminary
- Established: 1863
- Religious affiliation: Wisconsin Evangelical Lutheran Synod
- Chairman: Rev. Jonathan Scharf
- President: Rev. Earle Treptow
- Provost: Rev. Thomas Kock
- Faculty: 19
- Students: 186
- Location: Mequon, Wisconsin, United States
- Colors: no official colors
- Website: www.wisluthsem.org

Wisconsin Lutheran Seminary (WLS) is a post-secondary school that trains men to become pastors for the Wisconsin Evangelical Lutheran Synod (WELS). It is located in Mequon, Wisconsin.

The campus consists of 22 buildings, including a library that has over 58,000 volumes and a collection of rare pre-18th century theological books.

== History ==
Wisconsin Lutheran Seminary has been located in several different places throughout its history.

=== Origins in Watertown ===
The origins of the school date to 1863, when the main sources of clergy in the Wisconsin Synod were the mission societies in Germany. As the Wisconsin Synod moved to a more conservative and confessional theological stance, the theological character of clergy from the German mission societies came into question. Furthermore, it became more and more difficult to provide pastors in adequate numbers. To alleviate these problems the Wisconsin Synod formed the Theological School of the Wisconsin Synod in Watertown, Wisconsin. The first students met in the professor's home. In 1864, the Wisconsin Synod in convention resolved to provide a permanent building for the seminary. Five acres (20,000 m^{2}) of Watertown land were purchased for $600.00. Ground was broken on July 22, 1864, on what is now the campus of Luther Preparatory School. The building was dedicated on September 14, 1865. The third floor of the building was used for the seminary classes, and the first two levels were used for the synod's college, Northwestern College.

=== Merger with Concordia Seminary ===
Because of small enrollments and an increasing desire to enter into fellowship with the Missouri Synod, the school merged with that synod's Concordia Seminary in 1870. As part of the merger, it was agreed that the Missouri Synod would actively participate in Northwestern College by providing a professor for the school and assisting the school with financial support. Wisconsin was to send students to St. Louis, provide a professor, and contribute financial support for Concordia. Each synod was to retain management of its own institution. Six Wisconsin Synod students began study in St. Louis in March 1870.

=== Reopening in Milwaukee ===
In 1878, the WELS reopened a seminary in Milwaukee, Wisconsin, to help prevent the assimilation of the entire synod into the Missouri Synod. Wisconsin Synod leaders stressed that doctrinal fellowship was possible with the Missouri Synod without organizational unity. Two small houses were rented at the corner of Hubbard Street and Garfield Avenue and served as the school's campus for two years. Prof. Eugen Notz also served as the pastor of St. Marcus Lutheran Church a block away.

The school quickly outgrew that limited capacity. The seminary board authorized the purchase of a small nearby park at 13th and Vine streets to serve as the new campus. The park pavilion was remodeled into classrooms and a residence for Prof. Notz. Classes there began in 1880.

=== Move to Wauwatosa ===
Because the increasing number of seminarians outgrew the 13th Street facility, a new seminary campus was opened in 1893 in Wauwatosa, Wisconsin, with 31 students. The facility was a two-story building with a full basement and a large attic. The first floor held two classrooms, a chapel, a faculty lounge, several study rooms, and a restroom in each of the two wings. The second floor mirrored the layout of the first floor, with a large hall in the center. This space was later occupied by the library. The basement contained a kitchen and dining area, a washroom, and a recreation room. Years later, the attic was finished and outfitted for additional student quarters.

=== Permanent campus in Mequon ===
As enrollment at Wisconsin Lutheran Seminary continued to increase, synod and seminary administrators realized that a bigger facility would become necessary in the coming years. The synod purchased an 80-acre (320,000 m^{2}) farm in present-day Mequon near the village of Thiensville for $25,000. Seminary professor John Philip Koehler was given charge of the general design, incorporating the style and features of the Wartburg Castle in Eisenach, Germany.

Ground was broken for construction in 1928, and the cornerstone was laid that same year. The process of moving to the new campus began in the summer of 1929 and the first classes were held in the autumn semester of 1929.

== Campus ==
The Wisconsin Lutheran Seminary campus is situated on 80 acres (32 ha) in Mequon, Wisconsin. With large trees, expansive grassy fields, woods, a stream, and a small holding pond, the campus resembles a park.

=== Architectural features ===
The design of the campus mimics the architectural style of the Wartburg Castle in Eisenach, Germany. Features include stone walls and slate roofs. The overall layout of the dormitory and academic center is a ring, creating a courtyard in the center of the main complex. "Fachwerk", timber-framed brick walls, are also common on the campus.

=== Buildings ===
The seminary tower acts as a gateway to a central courtyard and divides the main building into two areas: the residence hall and dining hall lie to the west and administration-classroom building, chapel, and library to the east. The residence hall, consisting of eight units, can accommodate about 80 students. The dining hall seats approximately 150. Between 1997 and 2002, the residence hall was expanded to provide more room for each student. The classrooms were simultaneously remodeled to provide current technology. An auditorium-gymnasium, built in 1986, seats 1,200.

The campus features these main buildings and areas:

- Administration-Classroom
- Chapel
- Library
- Residence and Dining Hall
- Gymnasium

=== Gymnasium ===
Opened in 1986, the gymnasium seats 1,200. The main gymnasium contains two basketball courts and a volleyball court. The building also has a racquetball court, two locker rooms, and an exercise/weight room. The gymnasium is also used for concerts, holiday services, and graduations.

=== Chapel ===
Included in the 1929 building project was a chapel for campus worship. The original chapel was quite plain and did not contain any pews, musical instruments, art glass windows, or even a pulpit and altar. It was not until the 1930s that the chancel was decorated with the help of a local craftsman. For decades the chapel featured a small wooden altar, a pulpit, a lectern, wooden pews, tile floors, a Wick's organ, and three art glass windows behind the altar. Unfortunately, the low ceiling and small amount of natural light detracted greatly from the atmosphere.

==== Renovation ====
In 2002, the Wisconsin Lutheran Seminary facilities committee presented a study on the chapel, noting the surface deficiencies of the chapel and pointing out that the chapel architecture did not promote by example the type of liturgical worship practices currently taught at the seminary and commonly in practice among WELS congregations. The committee proposed a chapel renovation.

The renovation, funded primarily by special gifts, began in 2004 and took a full year to complete. Construction was completed in May, 2005. A dedication service was not held until the beginning of the following academic year, on August 29, 2005.

The new chapel design features large, clear windows to allow natural light to pour into the room. The windows are etched with symbols representing the four theological disciplines. The ceiling is now opened up to the tall gable roof. Dark stone tile floors contrast with the white paint on the walls and ceiling. Other features of the chapel include:

- Ambo - The ambo replaces pulpit and lectern as one central location for the reading of Scripture.
- Paschal candle - The Paschal candle reminds worshippers of Christ the lamb who was sacrificed for sin.
- Font - The baptismal font reminds worshippers of their own baptisms. The design allows for a constant flow of water that adds a gentle sound to the chapel.
- Freestanding altar - The altar and chairs are all freestanding and can be moved as needed. In practice, the chapel layout has remained the same since its dedication.

In May, 2006, the newly renovated chapel received a merit award from the American Institute of Architects Wisconsin chapter.

=== Library ===
The Wisconsin Lutheran Seminary library houses over 58,000 books, almost all on the subject of theology and the Bible. The library subscribes to over 300 periodicals and journals from around the world, most of which are theological in nature. The library contains more than 2,000 rare books, some from as early as 1500. Several examples are on display on the main level on the library. Other features of the library include a World Mission Collection, with mission materials printed in over 30 different languages. The library also maintains a vertical file of over 3,000 essays written by Wisconsin Synod pastors and professors, many of which can be accessed on the library's essay file website.
