= Luther Preparatory School =

Private college preparatory school in Watertown, Wisconsin, United States

Location
- 1300 Western Avenue; Watertown, Wisconsin 53094; United States; 43°11′20″N 88°42′41″W

Information
- Former names: Northwestern University (1865-1910); Northwestern College (1910-1974); Northwestern Preparatory School (1974-1995)
- Type: Private, co-educational residential
- Motto: Sapientia Fides Ministerium
- Religious affiliation: Wisconsin Evangelical Lutheran Synod
- Established: 1865
- President: Rev. Matthew Crass
- Dean: Rev. Brad Krause
- Faculty: 28
- Grades: 9–12
- Enrollment: 380 (2026-27)
- Colors: Navy blue and gold
- Mascot: Phoenix
- Newspaper: The Phoenix Flyer
- Yearbook: The Flame
- Website: http://www.lps.wels.net

Luther Preparatory School (LPS or Luther Prep) is a residential four-year secondary school located in Watertown, Wisconsin, United States. Established in 1865, it is owned and operated by the Wisconsin Evangelical Lutheran Synod (WELS). LPS focuses on preparing students to become WELS pastors and teachers and to continue their education at Martin Luther College (MLC), a WELS college in New Ulm, Minnesota. Curriculum at LPS focuses on the liberal arts and religious studies.

LPS has an enrollment of approximately 380 students, with slightly more boys than girls; three-fourths of the student body lives in dormitories on the 40-acre (160,000 m^{2}) campus. The campus has a main classroom building, dormitories, a student union/gymnasium, an auditorium, and a cafeteria. There are several sports fields, including a track, tennis courts, a football field, a soccer field, and softball and baseball fields. There are 28 full-time faculty members and nine additional piano instructors. Ten tutors live with students in the dormitories.

== History ==
Luther Preparatory School is the oldest Lutheran high school in the United States. LPS began its history as the prep department of Northwestern College, a pre-ministerial college established in 1865. The prep department received its own identity in 1974 as Northwestern Preparatory School (NPS). In 1995, Northwestern College moved to New Ulm, Minnesota, and combined with Dr. Martin Luther College to form Martin Luther College. In the same year, Martin Luther Preparatory School (MLPS) of Prairie du Chien, Wisconsin, was closed and combined with NPS to form Luther Preparatory School.

== Purpose ==
The mission of Luther Preparatory School is to prepare and encourage young men and women for the full-time ministry in the Wisconsin Evangelical Lutheran Synod.

== Athletics ==
Prep's mascot is the Phoenix. LPS plays in the Capitol Conference of WIAA. Fall sports include football and soccer for boys, volleyball and tennis for girls, and cross country for both. In the winter, there are boys' and girls' basketball, as well as boys' wrestling. Spring sports are baseball, softball, track and field, boys' tennis, girls' soccer, and golf. Luther Prep also offers intramural sports, such as basketball and volleyball.
