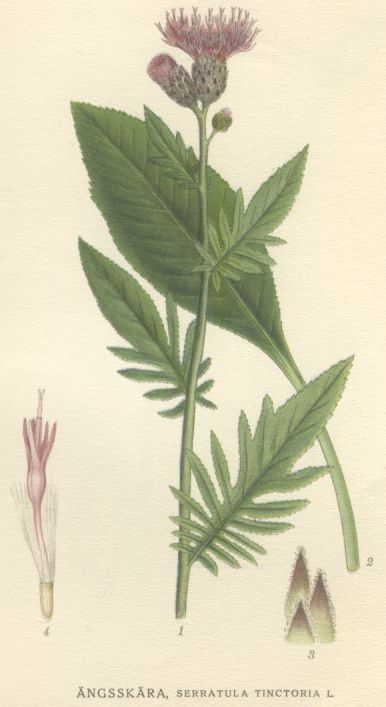
- Serratula tinctoria

Scientific classification
- Kingdom: Plantae
- Clade: Tracheophytes
- Clade: Angiosperms
- Clade: Eudicots
- Clade: Asterids
- Order: Asterales
- Family: Asteraceae
- Subfamily: Carduoideae
- Tribe: Cardueae
- Subtribe: Centaureinae
- Genus: Serratula; L.

Type species
- Serratula tinctoria L.

Synonyms
- Mastrucium Cass.; Crupinastrum Schur

= Serratula =

Genus of plants

Serratula is a genus of plants in the tribe Cardueae within the family Asteraceae native to Eurasia. Plumeless saw-wort is a common name for plants in this genus. Serratula as traditionally defined contains at least two groups: one of which is basal within the subtribe Centaureinae and one of which is derived; the former group can be moved to the genus Klasea.

Various species contain apigenin, luteolin, quercetin, other flavonoids and ecdysteroids.

Species

- Serratula alata Desf.
- Serratula alatavica C.A.Mey.
- Serratula algida Iljin
- Serratula angulata Kar. & Kir.
- Serratula aphyllopoda Iljin
- Serratula cardunculus (Pall.) Schischk.
- Serratula centauroides L.
- Serratula chanetii H.Lév.
- Serratula chartacea C.Winkl.
- Serratula chinensis S.Moore
- Serratula coriacea Fisch. & C.A.Mey.
- Serratula coronata L.
- Serratula cupuliformis Nakai & Kitag.
- Serratula dissecta Ledeb.
- Serratula dshungarica Iljin
- Serratula erucifolia (L.) Boriss.
- Serratula forrestii Iljin
- Serratula hastifolia Korovin & Kult. ex Iljin
- Serratula kirghisorum Iljin
- Serratula lancifolia Zakirov
- Serratula lyratifolia Schrenk
- Serratula marginata Tausch
- Serratula polycephala Iljin
- Serratula procumbens Regel
- Serratula rugulosa Iljin
- Serratula salsa Pall. ex M.Bieb.
- Serratula scordium Lour.
- Serratula sogdiana Bunge
- Serratula strangulata Iljin
- Serratula suffruticosa Schrenk
- Serratula tilesii Ledeb.
- Serratula tinctoria L.

Formerly included

Numerous species are now considered members of other genera:

- Acilepis
- Baccharoides
- Carphephorus
- Chronopappus
- Cirsium
- Crupina
- Cyanthillium
- Goniocaulon
- Hemistepta
- Heterocoma
- Hololepis
- Jurinea
- Klasea
- Laggera
- Leuzea
- Liatris
- Lucilia
- Olgaea
- Oligochaeta
- Ptilostemon
- Saussurea
- Scrobicaria
- Synurus
- Syreitschikovia
- Vernonia
