= Cyanopsis =

Cyanopsis may refer to:

- a synonym for Volutaria, a genus of flowering plants in the family Asteraceae
- Cyanopsis (fly), a genus of flies in the family Tachinidae

== See also ==
- Cyanopis, another genus of flowering plants
- Cyanopsia, a medial condition also known as "blue vision"
