= Plagiobasis =

Scientific classification
- Kingdom: Plantae
- Clade: Tracheophytes
- Clade: Angiosperms
- Clade: Eudicots
- Clade: Asterids
- Order: Asterales
- Family: Asteraceae
- Subfamily: Carduoideae
- Tribe: Cardueae
- Subtribe: Centaureinae
- Genus: Plagiobasis; Schrenk
- Species: P. centuroides

Binomial name
- Plagiobasis centuroides Schrenk

Synonyms
- Plagiobasis dshungaricus Iljin

Genus of plants

Plagiobasis is a genus of Asian flowering plants in the tribe Cardueae within the family Asteraceae.

Species

The only known species is Plagiobasis centuroides, native to Kazakhstan, Kyrgyzstan, Xinjiang, and Altai Krai.

formerly included

see Russowia

- Plagiobasis sogdiana Bunge - Russowia sogdiana (Bunge) B.Fedtsch.
