= Polytaxis =

Polytaxis may refer to:

- Polytaxis (plant), a genus of flowering plants in the family Asteraceae
- Polytaxis (foraminifera), a genus of foraminifers in the family Tetrataxidae
