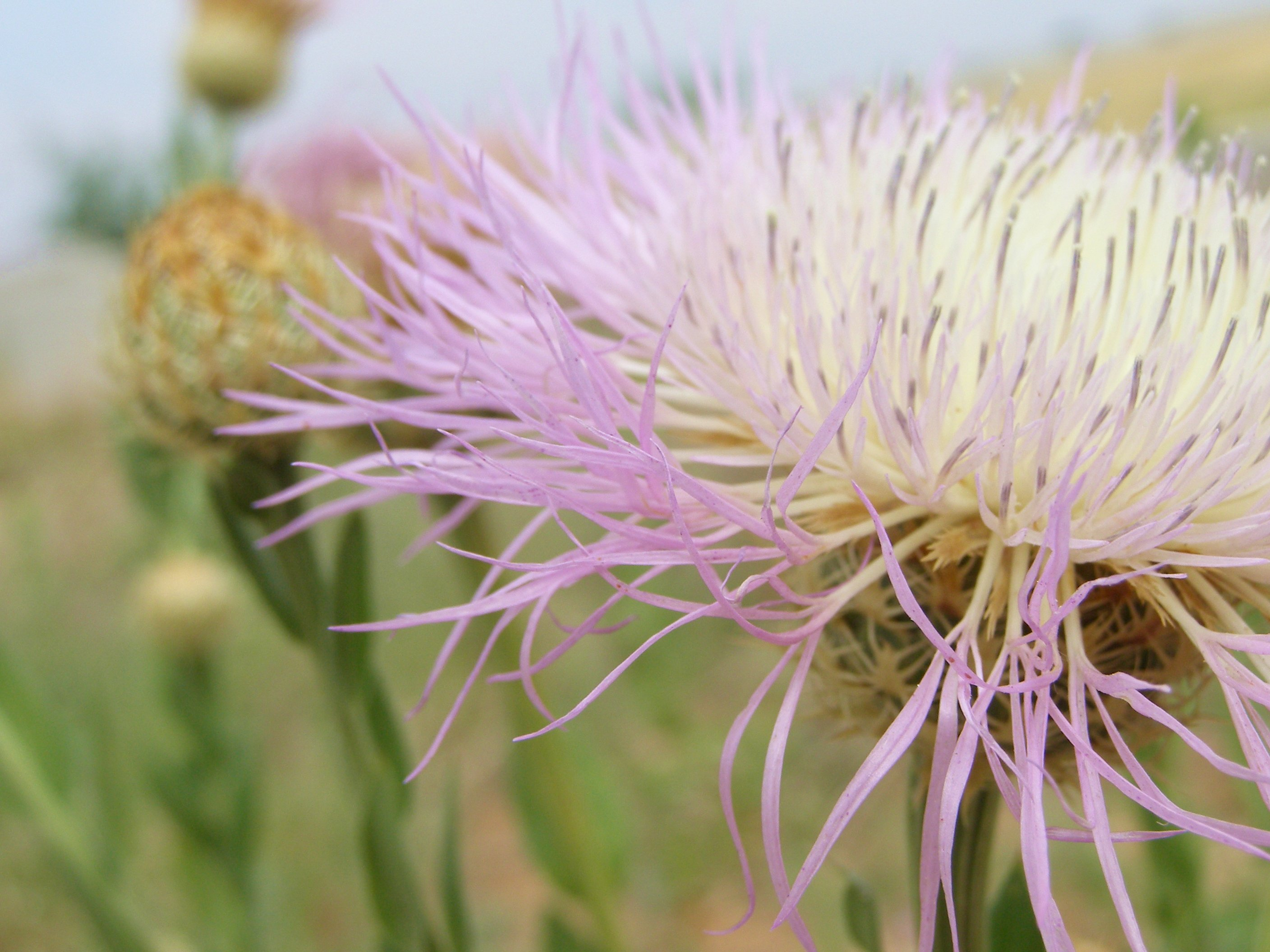
- Plectocephalus americanus

Scientific classification
- Kingdom: Plantae
- Clade: Tracheophytes
- Clade: Angiosperms
- Clade: Eudicots
- Clade: Asterids
- Order: Asterales
- Family: Asteraceae
- Subfamily: Carduoideae
- Tribe: Cardueae
- Subtribe: Centaureinae
- Genus: Plectocephalus; D.Don

Type species
- Plectocephalus americanus (Nutt.) D.Don

Synonyms
- Centaurea sect. Plectocephalus (D.Don) DC.

= Plectocephalus =

Genus of plants

Plectocephalus is a genus of flowering plants in the tribe Cardueae within the family Asteraceae, it contains seven described species mostly found in Americas and one in Africa.

Species

- Plectocephalus americanus (Nutt.) D.Don - Mexico (Coahuila, Tamaulipas, Nuevo León), United States (AZ NM TX LA AR MS KS MO IL WI SC NY)
- Plectocephalus cachinalensis (Phil.) N.Garcia & Susanna - Atacama Region in Chile
- Plectocephalus chilensis G.Don ex Loudon - Chile
- Plectocephalus floccosus (Hook. & Arn.) N.Garcia & Susanna - Chile (Coquimbo + Valparaíso)
- Plectocephalus rothrockii (Greenm.) D.J.N.Hind - Mexico (from Chihuahua to Chiapas), United States (AZ NM)
- Plectocephalus tweediei (Hook. & Arn.) N.Garcia & Susanna - Brazil (Rio Grande do Sul), Paraguay (Guairá), Uruguay, Argentina (Buenos Aires, Chaco, Misiones, Corrientes, Entre Ríos, Formosa)
- Plectocephalus varians (A.Rich.) - Ethiopia

Formerly included

Plectocephalus dracaenoides (Johow) F.H.Hellw. - Centaurodendron dracaenoides Johow
