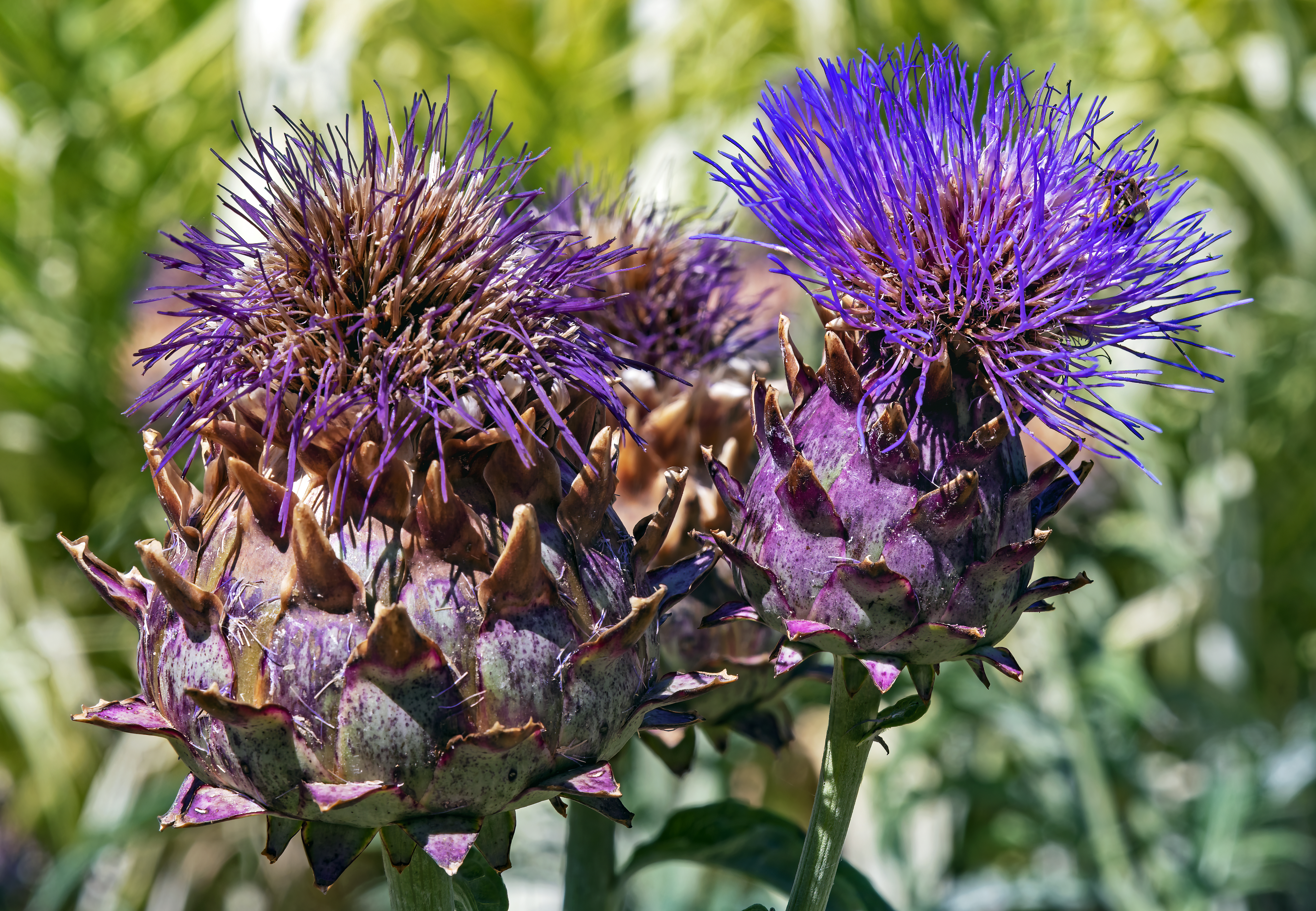
- Artichoke flower head

Scientific classification
- Kingdom: Plantae
- Clade: Tracheophytes
- Clade: Angiosperms
- Clade: Eudicots
- Clade: Asterids
- Order: Asterales
- Family: Asteraceae
- Subfamily: Carduoideae
- Tribe: Cardueae; Cass. (1819)

Subtribes
- Arctiinae; Berardiinae; Cardopatiinae; Carduinae; Carlininae; Centaureinae; Dipterocominae; Echinopsinae; Onopordinae; Saussureinae; Staehelininae; Xerantheminae

Synonyms
- Cynareae Less., nom. superfl.; Cynarocephalae Lam. & DC., nom. inval.

= Cardueae =

Tribe of flowering plants

The Cardueae are a tribe of flowering plants in the daisy family (Asteraceae) and the subfamily Carduoideae. Most of them are commonly known as thistles; four of the best known genera are Carduus, Cynara (containing the widely eaten artichoke and cardoni), Cirsium, and Onopordum.

They are annual, biennial, or perennial herbs. Many species are thorny on leaves, stems, or involucre, and some have laticifers or resin conduits. Almost 80 genera comprising 2500 species are assigned to this tribe, native of temperate regions of Europe and Asia (especially the Mediterranean region and Minor Asia), Australia and tropical Africa; only three genera contain species native to the Americas.

== Taxonomy ==
The correct name for the tribe has been disputed. In 1806, Jean-Baptiste Lamarck and Augustin Pyramus de Candolle published the name Cynarocephalae. This is a descriptive name, referring to the bluish colour of the flower heads. Such descriptive names for tribes are not valid under the International Code of Nomenclature for algae, fungi, and plants, which requires them to be based on a generic name. The name has been corrected by some authors to Cynareae, but this was not the name that was published in 1806. Christian Friedrich Lessing published Cynareae in 1830, but Henri Cassini had already published Cardueae in 1819, and as Lessing included Carduus in Cynareae, his name was superfluous.

Some authors have divided the plants traditionally held to be in this tribe into three tribes: Cynareae in the narrow sense, Carlineae, and Echinopeae. However, other authors have retained the traditional broader classification.

== Subtribes and genera ==
- Arctiinae Garcia-Jacas & Susanna
  - Arctium L.
  - Cousinia Cass.
- Berardiinae Garcia-Jacas & Susanna
  - Berardia Vill.
- CardopatiinaeLess.
  - Cardopatium Juss.
  - Cousiniopsis Nevski
- Carduinae Dumort.
  - Afrocarduus (Kazmi) N.Garcia, Moreyra & Susanna
  - Afrocirsium Calleja, N.Garcia, Moreyra & Susanna
  - × Carduogalactites P.Fourn.
  - × Cirsio-carduus P.Fourn.
  - Carduus L.
  - Cirsium Mill.
  - Cynara L.
  - Epitrachys (DC. ex Duby) K.Koch
  - Galactites Moench
  - Lamyropsis (Kharadze) Dittrich
  - Nuriaea Susanna, Calleja & Moreyra
  - Notobasis (Cass.) Cass.
  - Picnomon Adans.
  - Ptilostemon Cass.
  - Silybum Adans.
  - Tyrimnus (Cass.) Cass.
- Carlininae Dumort.
  - Atractylis L.
  - Atractylodes DC.
  - Carlina L.
  - Thevenotia DC.
  - Tugarinovia Iljin
- Centaureinae Dumort.
  - Amberboa (Pers.) Less.
  - Callicephalus C.A.Mey.
  - Carduncellus Adans.
  - Carthamus L.
  - Centaurea L.
  - Centaurodendron Johow
  - Centaurothamnus Wagenitz & Dittrich
  - Cheirolophus Cass.
  - Crocodilium Hill
  - Crupina (Pers.) DC.
  - Femeniasia Susanna
  - Goniocaulon Cass.
  - Karvandarina Rech.f.
  - Klasea Cass.
  - Leuzea DC.
  - Mantisalca Cass.
  - Myopordon Boiss.
  - Nikitinia Iljin
  - Oligochaeta (DC.) K.Koch
  - Phalacrachena Iljin
  - Phonus Hill
  - Plagiobasis Schrenk
  - Plectocephalus D.Don
  - Psephellus Cass.
  - Rhaponticoides Vaill.
  - Russowia C.Winkl.
  - Schischkinia Iljin
  - Serratula L.
  - Stizolophus Cass.
  - Tricholepis DC.
  - Volutaria Cass.
  - Yunquea Skottsb.
  - Zoegea L.
- Dipterocominae Garcia-Jacas & Susanna
  - Dipterocome Fisch. & C.A.Mey.
- Echinopsinae Dumort.
  - Echinops L.
- Onopordinae Garcia-Jacas & Susanna
  - Alfredia Cass.
  - Ancathia DC.
  - Lamyropappus Knorring & Tamamsch.
  - Olgaea Iljin
  - Onopordum L.
  - Synurus Iljin
  - Syreitschikovia Pavlov
  - Xanthopappus C.Winkl.
- Saussureinae Garcia-Jacas & Susanna
  - Dolomiaea DC.
  - Jurinea Cass.
  - Polytaxis Bunge
  - Saussurea DC.
- Staehelininae Garcia-Jacas & Susanna
  - Staehelina L.
- Xerantheminae Cass. ex Dumort.
  - Amphoricarpos Vis.
  - Chardinia Desf.
  - Shangwua Yu J.Wang, Raab-Straube, Susanna & J.Quan Liu
  - Siebera J.Gay
  - Xeranthemum L.
