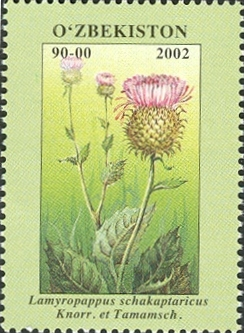
- Uzbekistan postage stamp

Scientific classification
- Kingdom: Plantae
- Clade: Embryophytes
- Clade: Tracheophytes
- Clade: Angiosperms
- Clade: Eudicots
- Clade: Asterids
- Order: Asterales
- Family: Asteraceae
- Subfamily: Carduoideae
- Tribe: Cardueae
- Subtribe: Onopordinae
- Genus: Lamyropappus; Knorring & Tamamschian
- Species: L. schakaptaricus

Binomial name
- Lamyropappus schakaptaricus (O.Fedtsch. & B.Fedtsch.) Knorring & Tamamschian

Synonyms
- Cirsium schakaptaricum O.Fedtsch. & B.Fedtsch.

= Lamyropappus =

Genus of flowering plants

Lamyropappus is a genus of flowering plants in the family Asteraceae.

== Species ==
There is only one known species, Lamyropappus schakaptaricus, native to Kazakhstan.
