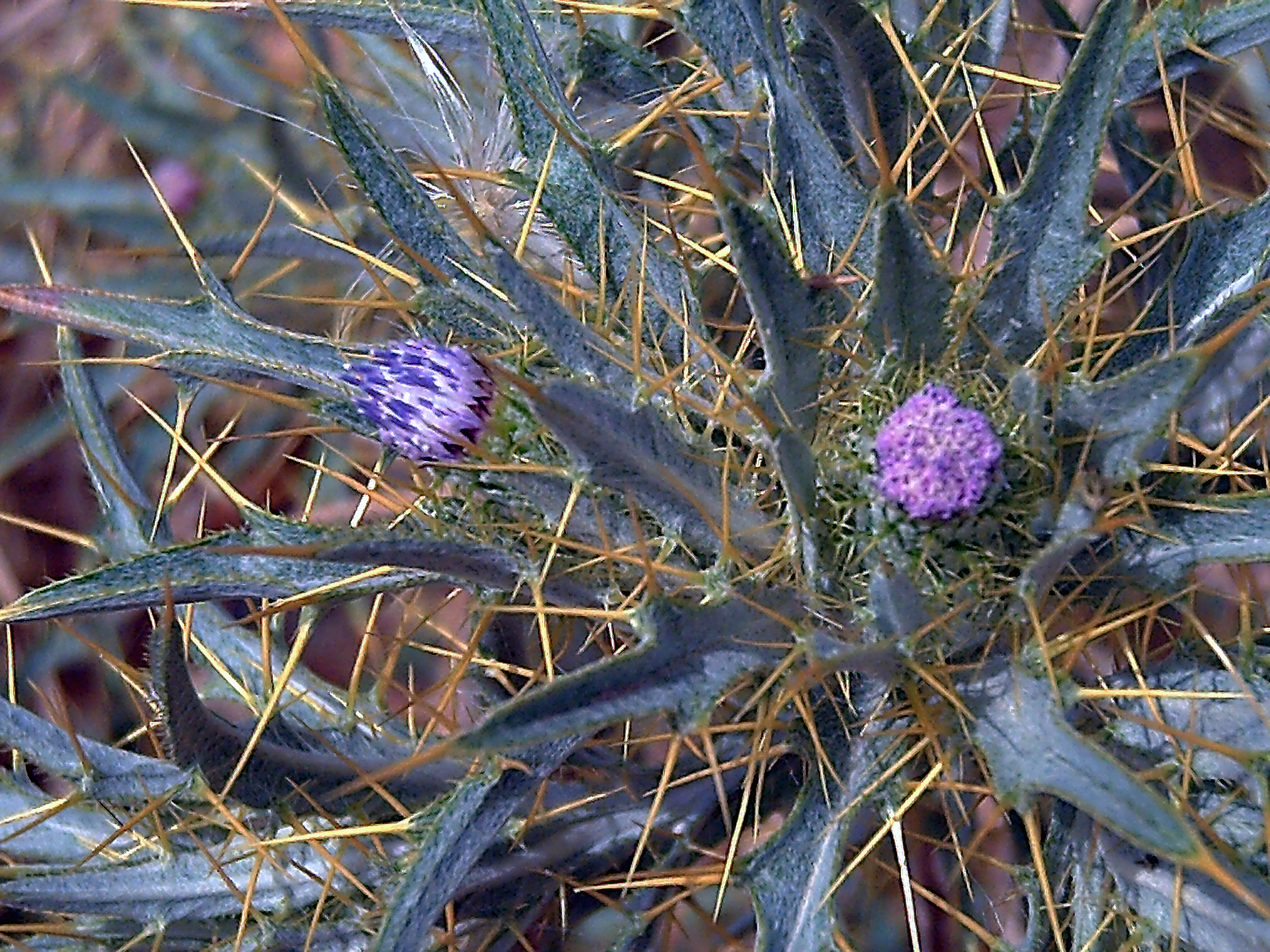

Scientific classification
- Kingdom: Plantae
- Clade: Embryophytes
- Clade: Tracheophytes
- Clade: Angiosperms
- Clade: Eudicots
- Clade: Asterids
- Order: Asterales
- Family: Asteraceae
- Subfamily: Carduoideae
- Tribe: Cardueae
- Subtribe: Carduinae
- Genus: Picnomon; Adans.
- Species: P. acarna

Binomial name
- Picnomon acarna (L.) Cass.

Synonyms
- Piknomon Adans., alternate spelling; Acarna Vaill.; Carduus acarna L.; Carlina acarna (L.) M.Bieb.; Cirsium pisidium Wettst.; Cnicus acarna (L.) L.; Carthamus canescens Lam.; Cirsium acarna (L.) Moench

= Picnomon =

Genus of flowering plants

Picnomon is a genus of flowering plants in the tribe Cardueae within the family Asteraceae. The only known species is Picnomon acarna, native to Europe, Asia, and Africa from Portugal and the Canary Islands to Kazakhstan.
