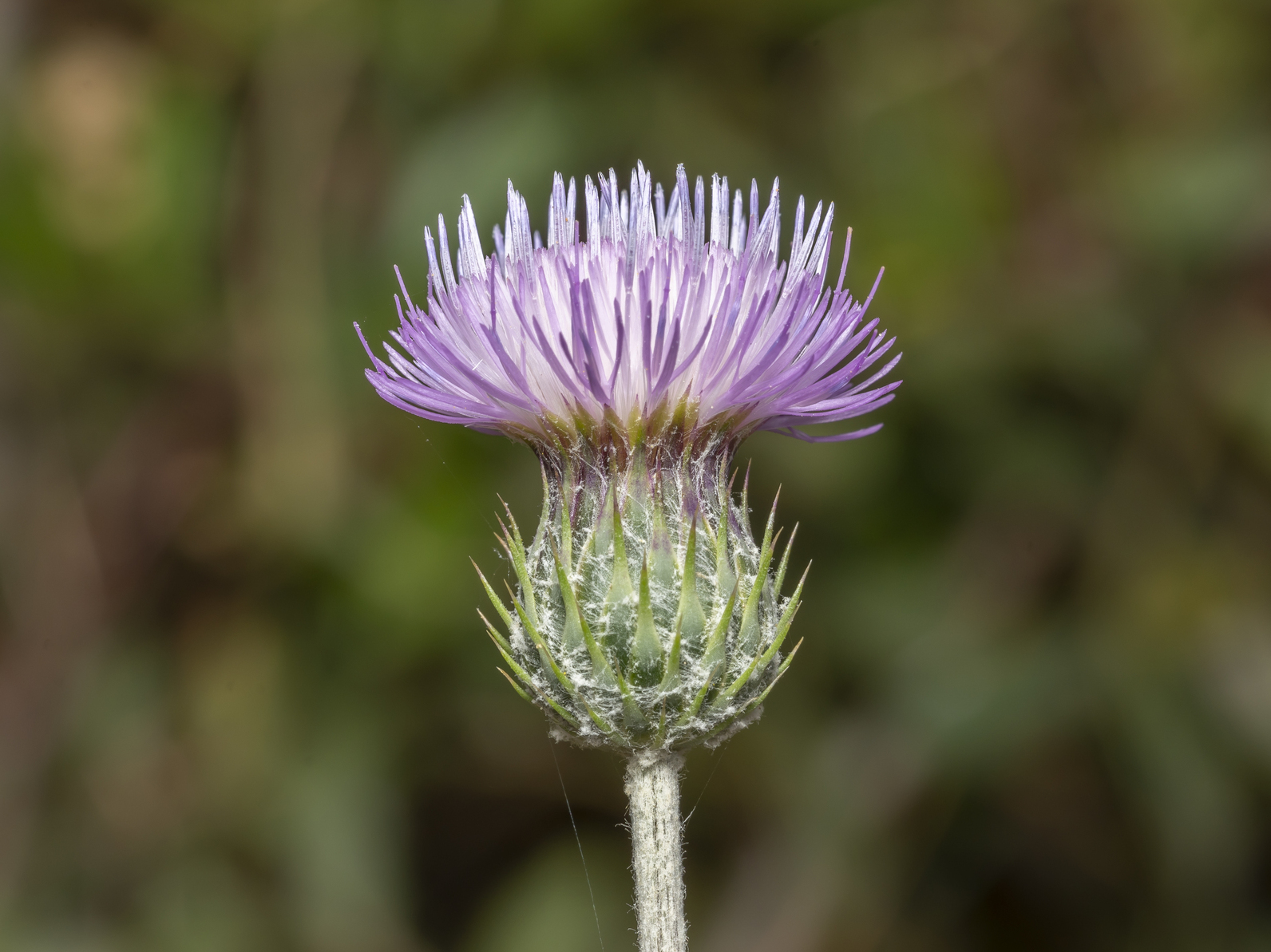

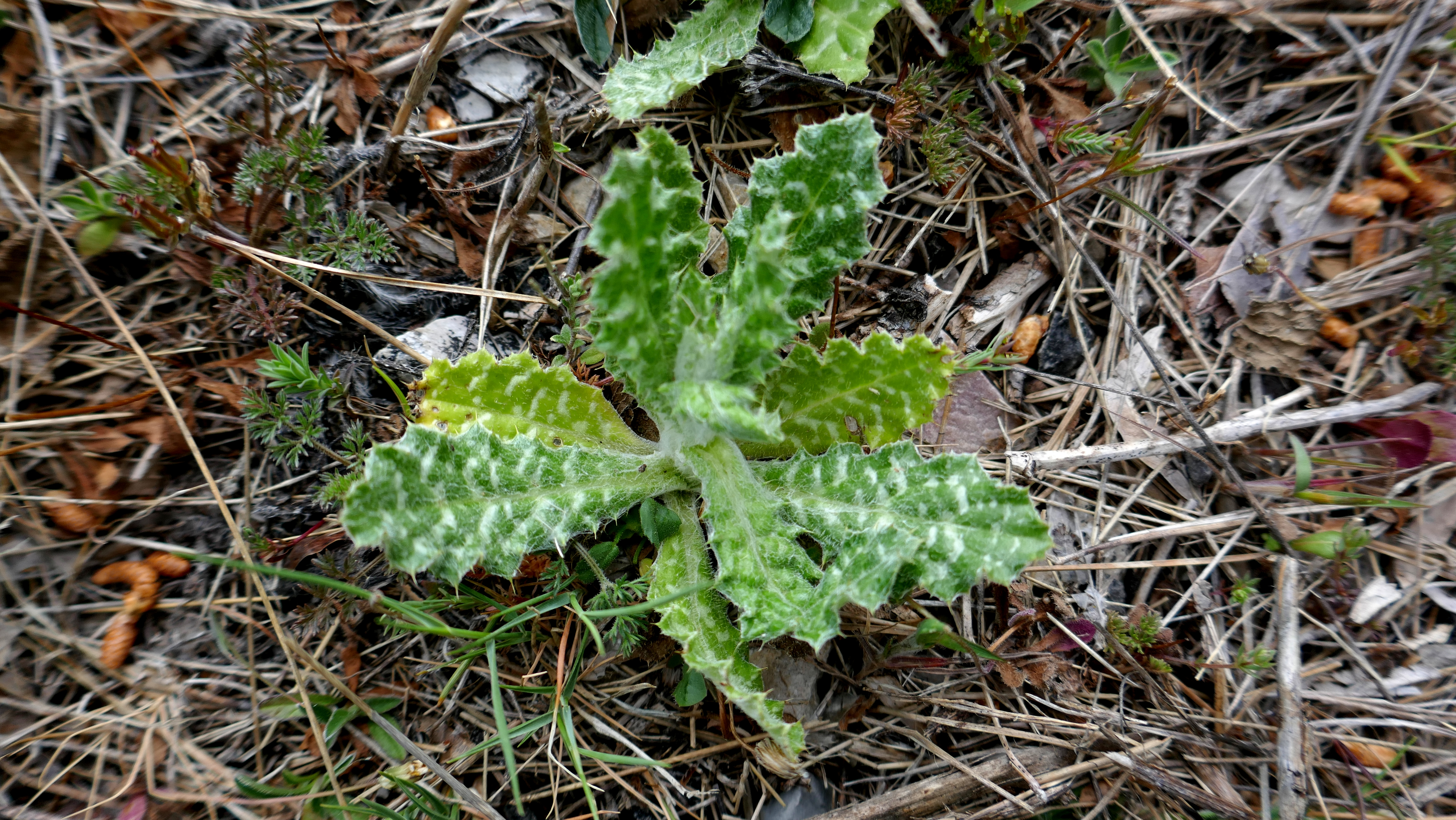

Scientific classification
- Kingdom: Plantae
- Clade: Tracheophytes
- Clade: Angiosperms
- Clade: Eudicots
- Clade: Asterids
- Order: Asterales
- Family: Asteraceae
- Subfamily: Carduoideae
- Tribe: Cardueae
- Subtribe: Carduinae
- Genus: Tyrimnus (Cass.) Cass.
- Species: T. leucographus

Binomial name
- Tyrimnus leucographus (L.) Cass.

Synonyms
- Carduus leucographus L. (type species); Tyrimnus leucographus f. albiflorus Röhl.; Acarna leucographa Hill; Cirsium maculatum Lam.

= Tyrimnus =

Genus of flowering plants

Tyrimnus, is a genus of Mediterranean plants in the tribe Cardueae within the family Asteraceae. The only known species is Tyrimnus leucographus also known as the White-Spotted Thistle, a biennial native to the Mediterranean region of southern Europe, North Africa, and the Middle East.

== Description ==
The tyrimnus plant has a pale, slender and leafless stalk with a spiny bulb-like flower head which consists of tubular florets that come in shades of pink or violet. It has basal leaves that are notabely serrated and lobed, whereas the upper leaves are small.

=== Morphology ===
The plant flowers in the spring and summer months with inflorescence reaching 14 to 16 millimeters. The height of this plant can range between 20 and 200 centimeters. There are both elliptic and lanceolate leaves. As for its fruit (achenes), it has single seeded fruit clusters that have feathery hair.

== Ecology ==
While blooming from May to July, the tyrimnus attracts pollinators including bees. This plant thrives in dry environments and is remarkably wind and drought resistant. It prefers lean soils with neutral to slightly alkaline (7.0 to 7.5) pH levels.
