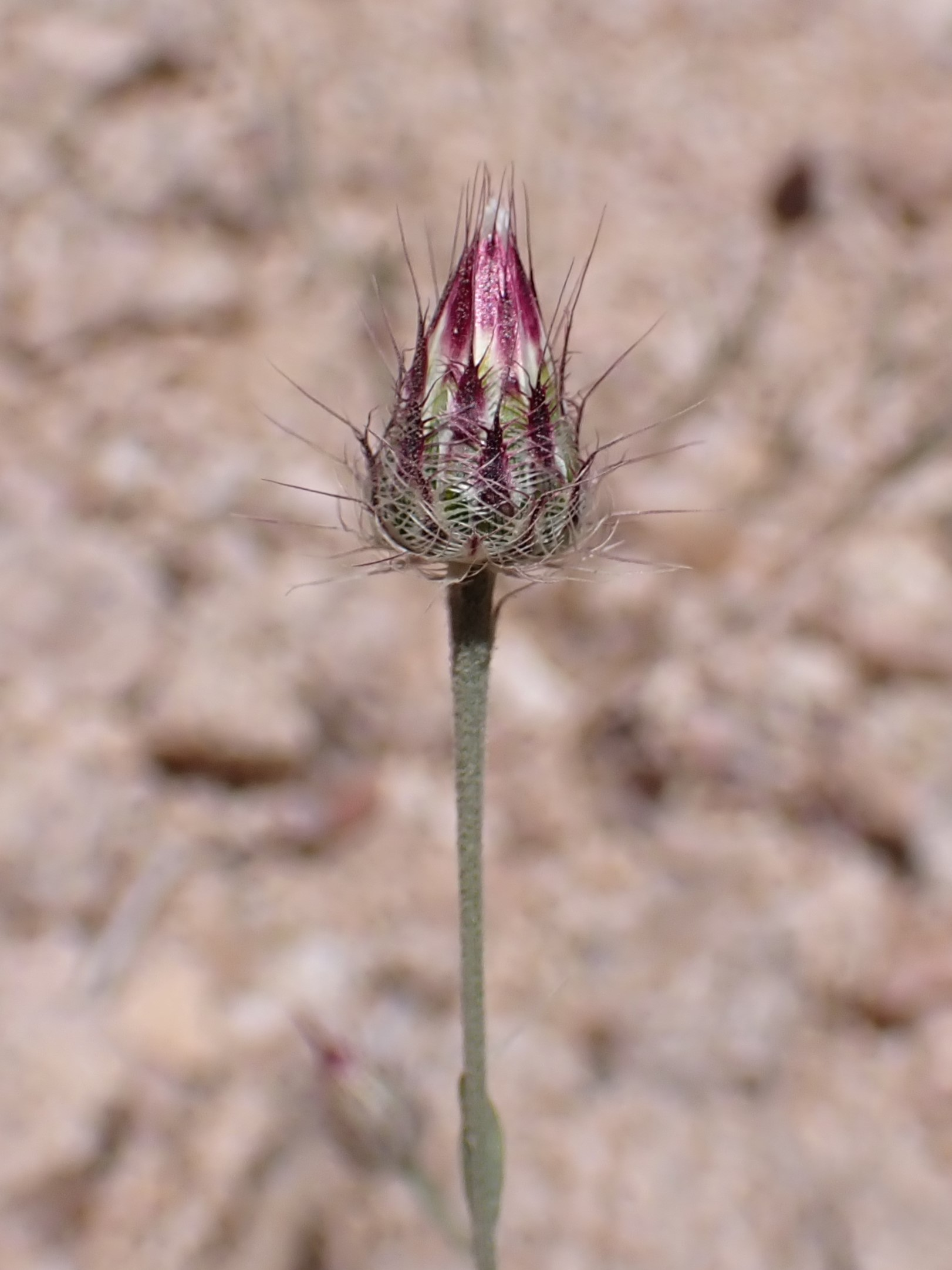
- Zoegea purpurea

Scientific classification
- Kingdom: Plantae
- Clade: Embryophytes
- Clade: Tracheophytes
- Clade: Angiosperms
- Clade: Eudicots
- Clade: Asterids
- Order: Asterales
- Family: Asteraceae
- Subfamily: Carduoideae
- Tribe: Cardueae
- Subtribe: Centaureinae
- Genus: Zoegea; L.

Type species
- Zoegea leptaurea L.

Synonyms
- Zoegaea, alternate spelling

= Zoegea =

Genus of flowering plants

Zoegea is a genus of flowering plants in the tribe Cardueae within the family Asteraceae, which found in Middle East, from Egypt to Indian subcontinent and Central Asia.

Species

- Zoegea crinita Boiss. - Tajikistan
- Zoegea leptaurea L. - Saudi Arabia, Syria, Lebanon, Turkey
- Zoegea purpurea Fresen. - Egypt, Arabian Peninsula, Middle East, Central Asia, Indian subcontinent
