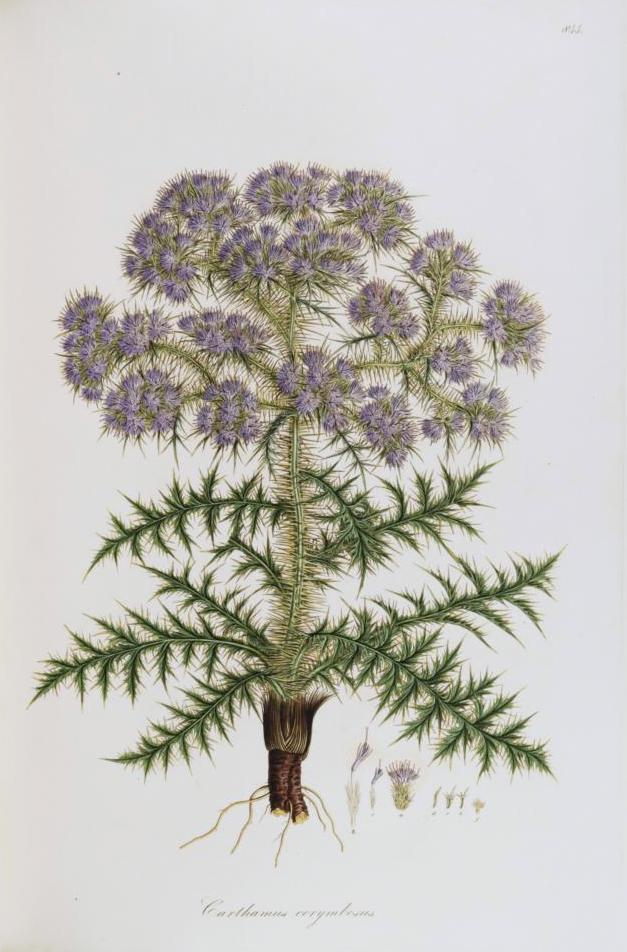
- Cardopatium corymbosum

Scientific classification
- Kingdom: Plantae
- Clade: Embryophytes
- Clade: Tracheophytes
- Clade: Angiosperms
- Clade: Eudicots
- Clade: Asterids
- Order: Asterales
- Family: Asteraceae
- Subfamily: Carduoideae
- Tribe: Cardueae
- Subtribe: Cardopatiinae
- Genus: Cardopatium; Juss.

Type species
- Cardopatium corymbosum (L.) Pers.

Synonyms
- Cardopatum spelling variant; Broteroa Kuntze; Brotera Willd. 1803 not Cav. 1799 (Malvaceae) nor Spreng. 1801 (Asteraceae) nor Spreng. 1801 (Lamiaceae) nor Vell. 1825 (Malvaceae); Chamalium Juss.

= Cardopatium =

Genus of flowering plants

Cardopatium is a genus of flowering plants in the tribe Cardueae within the family Asteraceae. They are native to the central and eastern Mediterranean region.

Species

- Cardopatium amethystinum Spach - Algeria, Tunisia
- Cardopatium corymbosum (L.) Pers. - Greece, Italy, Macedonia, Turkey, Cyprus, Lebanon, Syria, Israel, Palestine, Jordan, Algeria
