= Shangwua =

Scientific classification
- Kingdom: Plantae
- Clade: Tracheophytes
- Clade: Angiosperms
- Clade: Eudicots
- Clade: Asterids
- Order: Asterales
- Family: Asteraceae
- Subfamily: Carduoideae
- Tribe: Cardueae
- Subtribe: Xerantheminae
- Genus: Shangwua; Yu J.Wang, Raab-Straube, Susanna & J.Quan Liu

Genus of flowering plant

Shangwua is a genus of Asian flowering plants belonging to the family Asteraceae.

Its native range is from Afghanistan to central and eastern Asia (within East Himalaya, Nepal, Pakistan, Tadzhikistan, Tibet and West Himalaya) and to southern central China and Myanmar.

The genus name of Shangwua is in honour of Shang Wu Liu (b. 1934), Chinese botanist, taxonomist and professor in the province of Qinghai, China. It was first described and published in Taxon Vol.62 on page 992 in 2013.

== Known species ==
According to Kew:

- Shangwua denticulata (DC.) Raab-Straube & Yu J.Wang
- Shangwua jacea (Klotzsch) Yu J.Wang & Raab-Straube
- Shangwua masarica (Lipsky) Yu J.Wang & Raab-Straube
