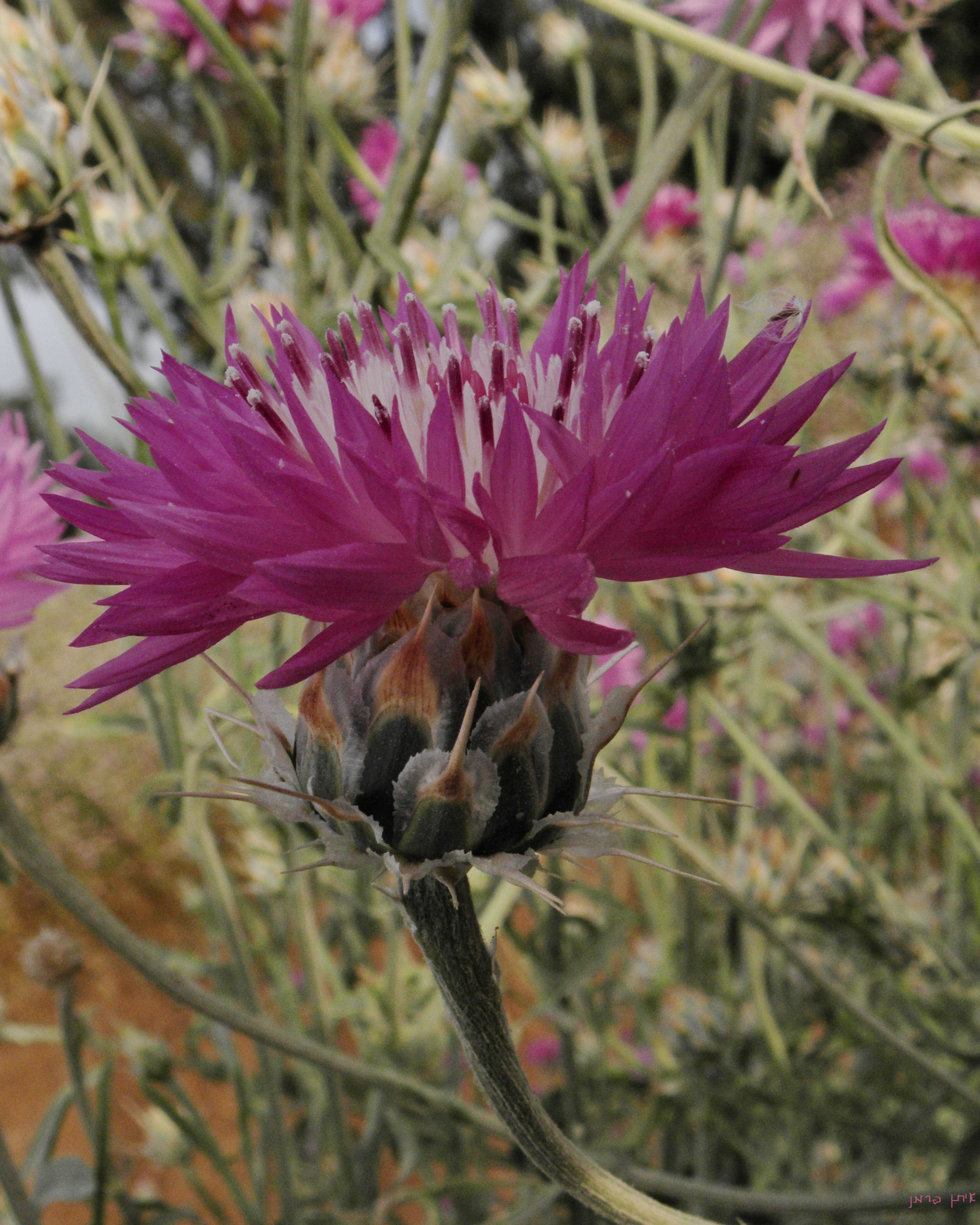
- Crocodilium crocodylium in Israel

Scientific classification
- Kingdom: Plantae
- Clade: Tracheophytes
- Clade: Angiosperms
- Clade: Eudicots
- Clade: Asterids
- Order: Asterales
- Family: Asteraceae
- Subfamily: Carduoideae
- Tribe: Cardueae
- Subtribe: Centaureinae
- Genus: Crocodilium; Hill

= Crocodilium =

Genus of flowering plants

Crocodilium is a genus of flowering plants belonging to the family Asteraceae.

Its native range is Eastern Mediterranean.

Species:

- Crocodilium creticum (Boiss. & Heldr.) N.Garcia & Susanna
- Crocodilium crocodylium (L.) Hill
