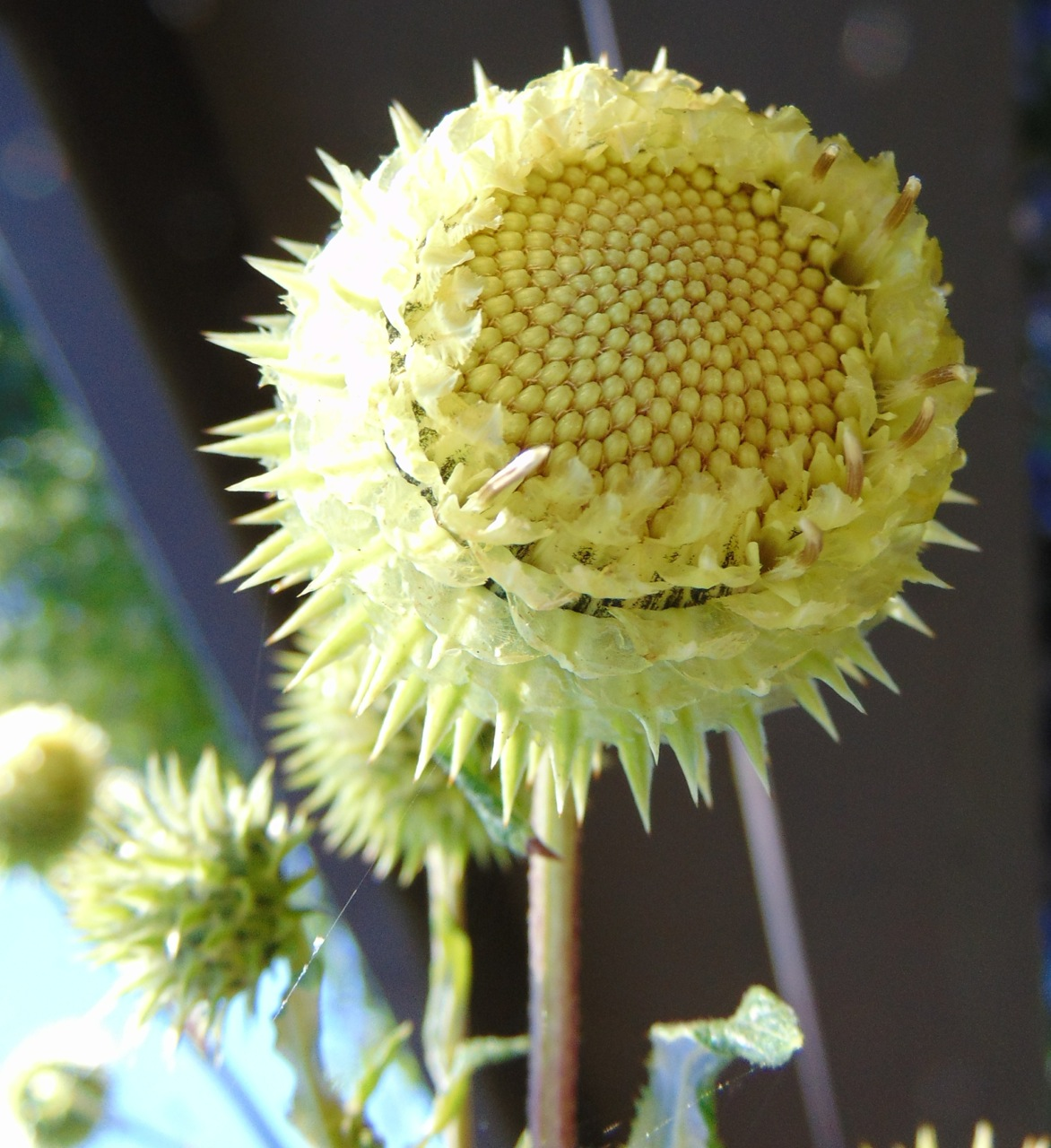
- Alfredia cernua

Scientific classification
- Kingdom: Plantae
- Clade: Tracheophytes
- Clade: Angiosperms
- Clade: Eudicots
- Clade: Asterids
- Order: Asterales
- Family: Asteraceae
- Subfamily: Carduoideae
- Tribe: Cardueae
- Subtribe: Onopordinae
- Genus: Alfredia; Cass.

Type species
- Alfredia cernua (L.) Cass.

= Alfredia =

Genus of flowering plants

Alfredia is a genus of flowering plants in the tribe Cardueae within the family Asteraceae described as a genus in 1816.

Alfredia is native to Central Asia and western China.

Species

- Alfredia acantholepis Kar. & Kir. - Xinjiang, Altai, Kazakhstan, Kyrgyzstan, Uzbekistan
- Alfredia aspera C.Shih - Xinjiang
- Alfredia cernua (L.) Cass. - Xinjiang, Altai, Kazakhstan
- Alfredia fetissowii Iljin - Xinjiang, Kyrgyzstan
- Alfredia integrifolia (Iljin) Tulyag. - Central Asia
- Alfredia nivea Kar. & Kir. - Xinjiang, Altai, Kazakhstan, Kyrgyzstan, Uzbekistan
- Alfredia talassica Korovin ex Iljin - Turkmenistan
