= Siebera =

Scientific classification
- Kingdom: Plantae
- Clade: Embryophytes
- Clade: Tracheophytes
- Clade: Spermatophytes
- Clade: Angiosperms
- Clade: Eudicots
- Clade: Asterids
- Order: Asterales
- Family: Asteraceae
- Subfamily: Carduoideae
- Tribe: Cardueae
- Subtribe: Xerantheminae
- Genus: Siebera; J.Gay 1827, conserved name, not Hoppe 1819 (Caryophyllaceae) nor Rchb. 1828 (Apiaceae)

Type species
- Siebera pungens (Lam.) J.Gay

Genus of flowering plants

Siebera is a genus of flowering plants in the tribe Cardueae in the family Asteraceae, native to Western Asia.

Species

- Siebera nana (DC.) Bornm. – Israel, Palestine, Jordan, Lebanon, Syria, Turkey, Iran, Afghanistan
- Siebera pungens (Lam.) J.Gay – Israel, Palestine, Jordan, Lebanon, Syria, Turkey
