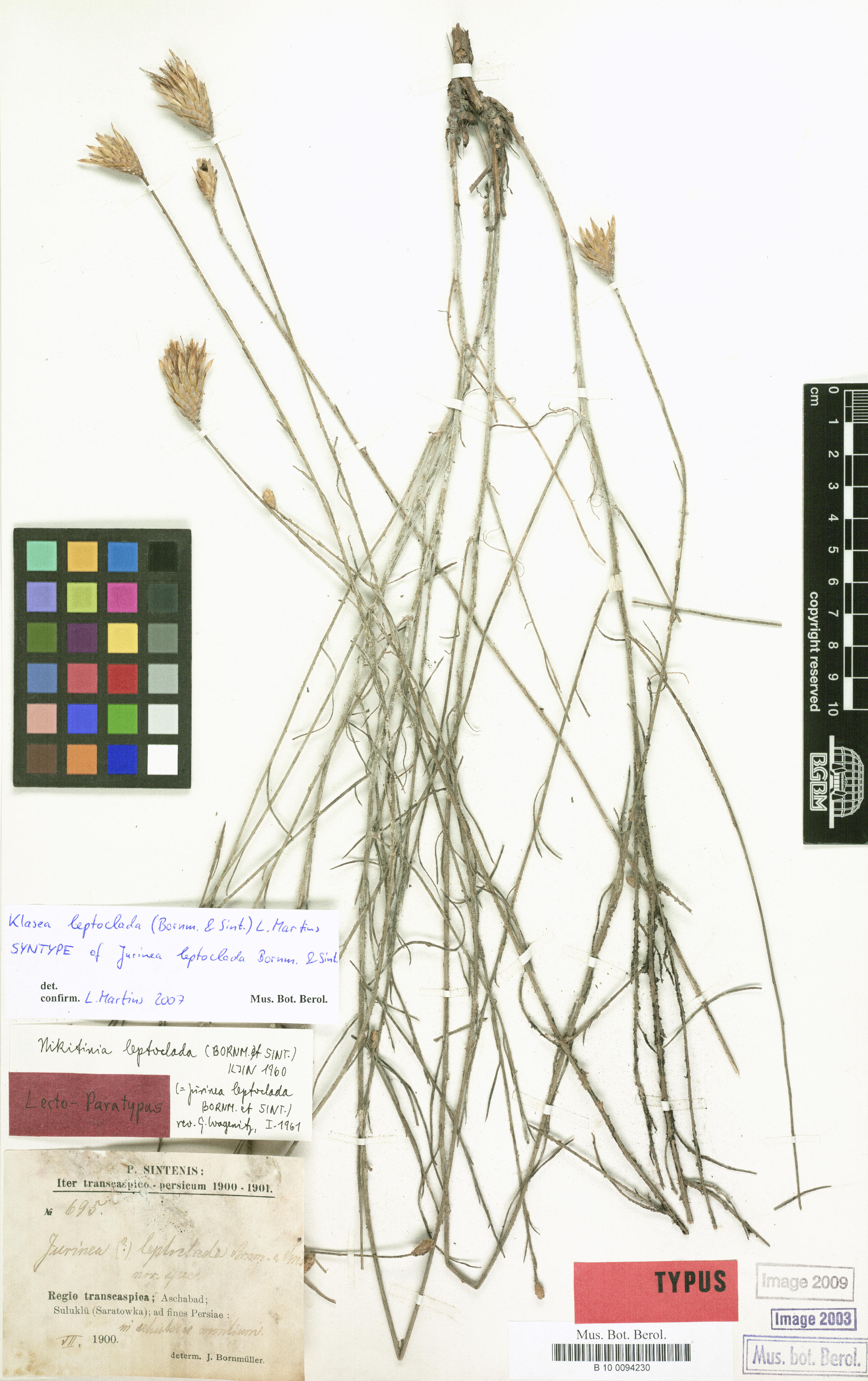

Scientific classification
- Kingdom: Plantae
- Clade: Embryophytes
- Clade: Tracheophytes
- Clade: Spermatophytes
- Clade: Angiosperms
- Clade: Eudicots
- Clade: Asterids
- Order: Asterales
- Family: Asteraceae
- Subfamily: Carduoideae
- Tribe: Cardueae
- Subtribe: Centaureinae
- Genus: Nikitinia; Iljin
- Species: N. leptoclada

Binomial name
- Nikitinia leptoclada (Bornm. & Sint.) Iljin

Synonyms
- Klasea sect. Nikitinia (Iljin) L.Martins; Jurinea leptoclada Bornm. & Sint.

= Nikitinia =

Genus of flowering plants

Nikitinia is a genus of flowering plants in the family Asteraceae.

There is only one known species, Nikitinia leptoclada, native to Iran and Turkmenistan.
