= Callicephalus =

Scientific classification
- Kingdom: Plantae
- Clade: Tracheophytes
- Clade: Angiosperms
- Clade: Eudicots
- Clade: Asterids
- Order: Asterales
- Family: Asteraceae
- Subfamily: Carduoideae
- Tribe: Cardueae
- Subtribe: Centaureinae
- Genus: Callicephalus; C.A.Mey.
- Species: C. nitens

Binomial name
- Callicephalus nitens (Willd.) C.A.Mey.

Genus of flowering plants

Callicephalus is a monotypic genus of flowering plants in the family Asteraceae, containing the single species Callicephalus nitens. It is native to the middle and low mountains of the Caucasus, where it has been recorded in Armenia, Azerbaijan, Georgia, Russia, and Turkey.

The genus is considered part of the Rhaponticum group in the Asteraceae tribe Cardueae, but according to molecular analyses it has no close relatives. Its isolation in the phylogeny of the tribe suggests it is a relict taxon, one of many relict plants that grow in the Caucasus.
