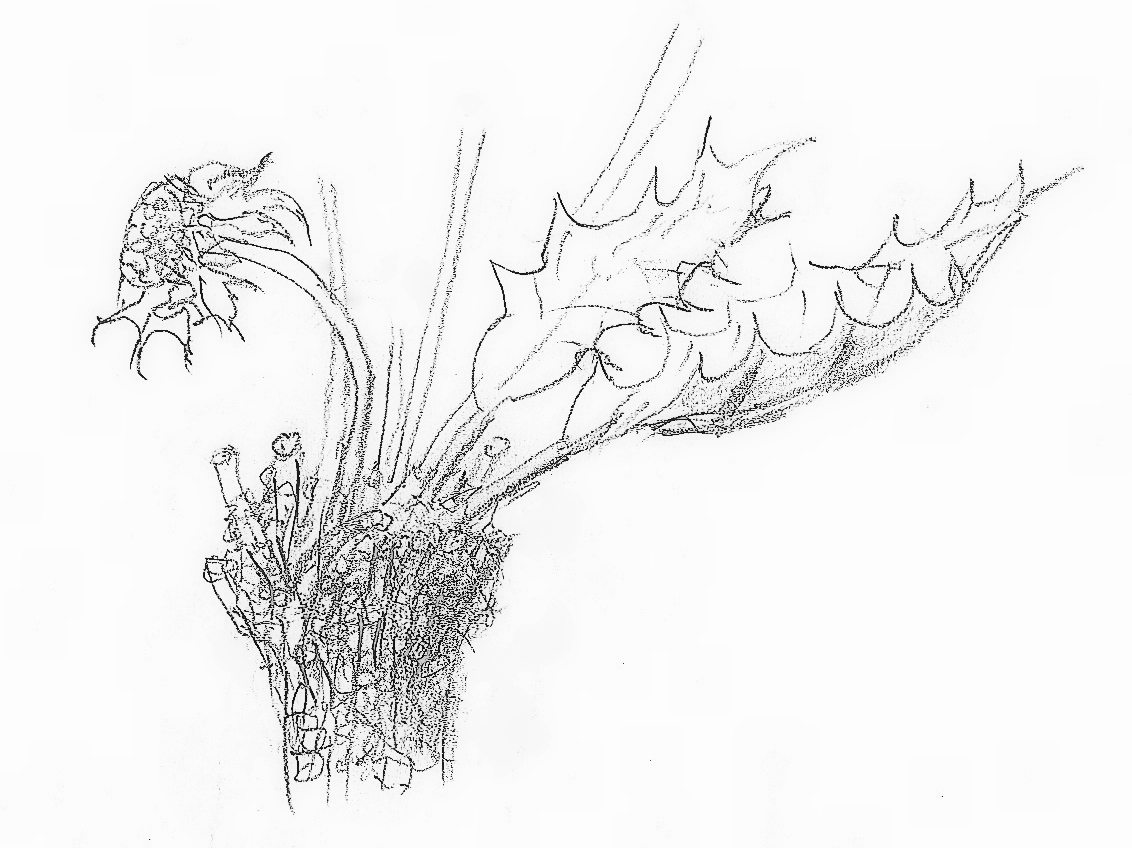

Scientific classification
- Kingdom: Plantae
- Clade: Tracheophytes
- Clade: Angiosperms
- Clade: Eudicots
- Clade: Asterids
- Order: Asterales
- Family: Asteraceae
- Subfamily: Carduoideae
- Tribe: Cardueae
- Subtribe: Carlininae
- Genus: Tugarinovia; Iljin
- Species: T. mongolica

Binomial name
- Tugarinovia mongolica Iljin

Synonyms
- Tugarinovia ovatifolia (Ling & Ma) Y.Z.Zhao

= Tugarinovia =

Genus of flowering plants

Tugarinovia is a genus of East Asian flowering plants in the tribe Cardueae within the family Asteraceae.

Species

There is only one known species, Tugarinovia mongolica, native to (Outer) Mongolia and Inner Mongolia.

varieties

- Tugarinovia mongolica var. mongolica
- Tugarinovia mongolica var. ovatifolia Ling & Ma
