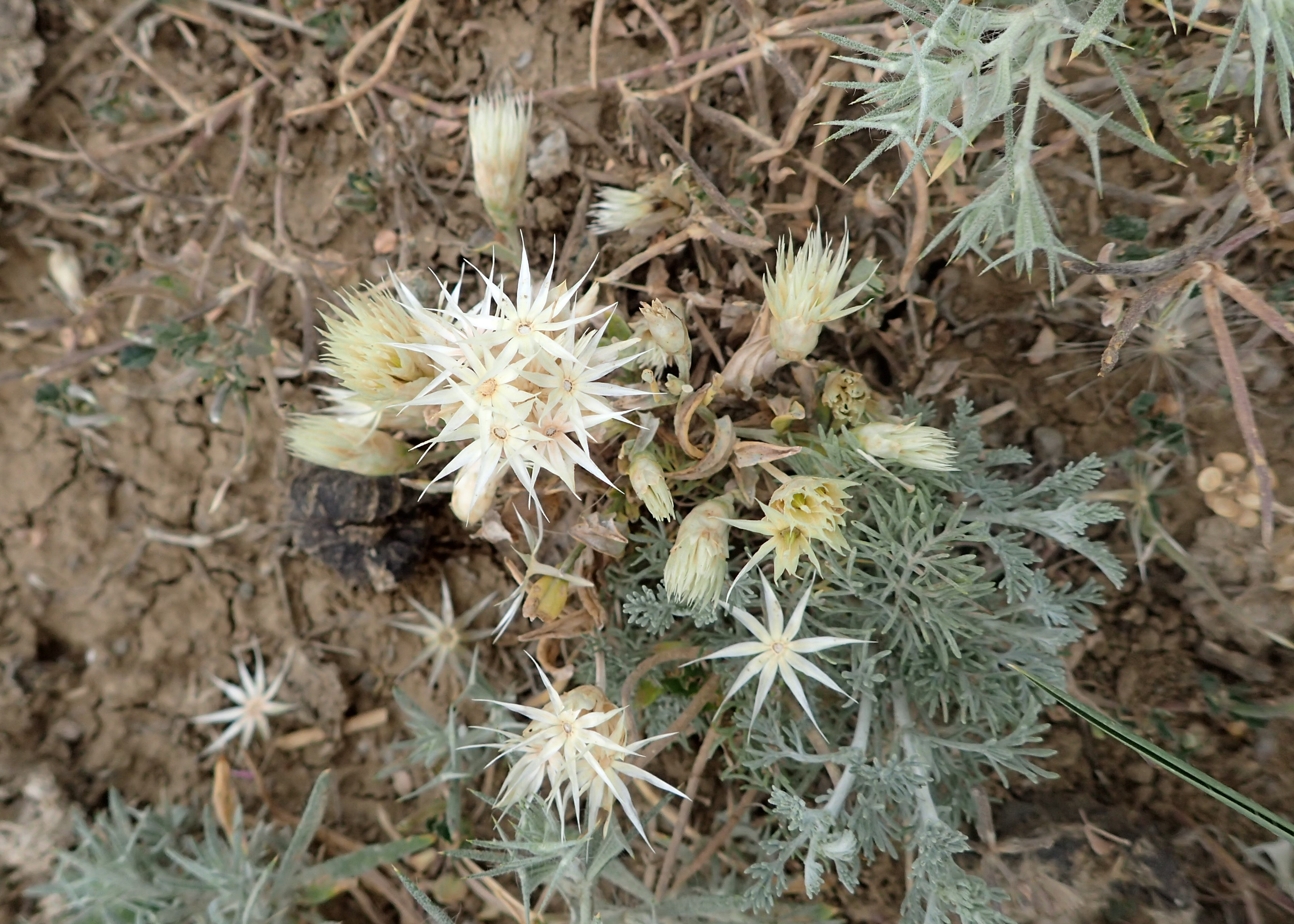
- Chardinia orientalis

Scientific classification
- Kingdom: Plantae
- Clade: Embryophytes
- Clade: Tracheophytes
- Clade: Angiosperms
- Clade: Eudicots
- Clade: Asterids
- Order: Asterales
- Family: Asteraceae
- Subfamily: Carduoideae
- Tribe: Cardueae
- Subtribe: Xerantheminae
- Genus: Chardinia; Desf.
- Species: C. orientalis

Binomial name
- Chardinia orientalis (L.) Kuntze

Synonyms
- Xeranthemum annuum var. orientale L.; Xeranthemum orientale (L.) Mill.; Chardinia macrocarpa K.Koch; Chardinia orientalis (L.) Briq.; Chardinia xeranthemoides Desf.

= Chardinia =

Genus of flowering plants

Chardinia is a genus of flowering plants in the family Asteraceae.

There is only one known species, Chardinia orientalis, native to the Middle East, Greece, and Central Asia.
