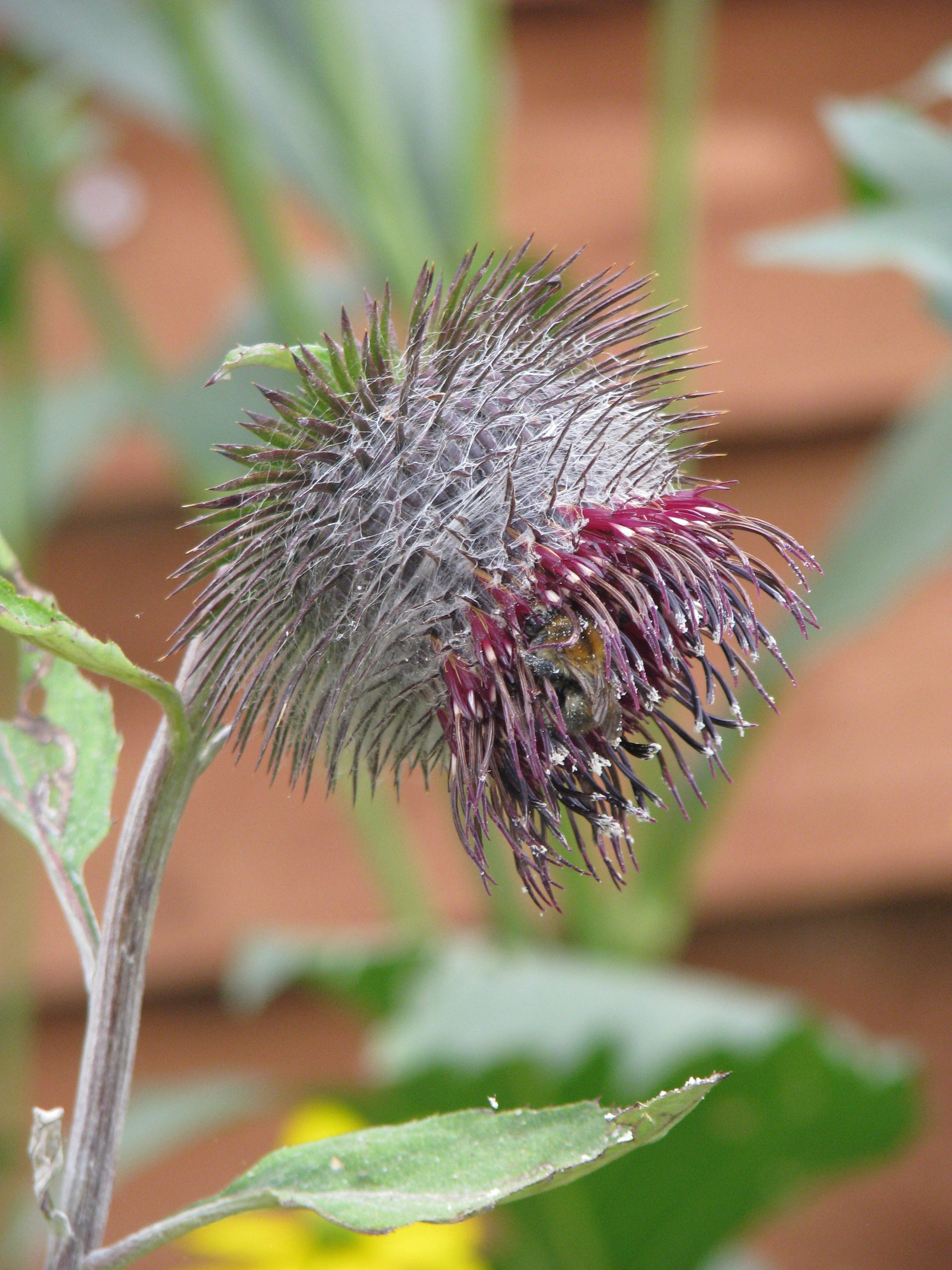
- Synurus pungens

Scientific classification
- Kingdom: Plantae
- Clade: Tracheophytes
- Clade: Angiosperms
- Clade: Eudicots
- Clade: Asterids
- Order: Asterales
- Family: Asteraceae
- Subfamily: Carduoideae
- Tribe: Cardueae
- Subtribe: Onopordinae
- Genus: Synurus; Iljin

Type species
- Synurus atriplicifolius (Treviranus) Iljin

= Synurus =

Genus of plants

Synurus is a genus of plants in the tribe Cardueae of the family Asteraceae. Species of the genus are found in Asia.

Synurus species have a thick stem up to 1.5 meters tall. They produce large, nodding, spherical flower heads up to 6 centimeters wide with purple florets.

The anti-inflammatory properties of these species as a herbal remedy have been well studied. They are eaten as a wild vegetable in Korea.

Species

- Synurus deltoides (Aiton) Nakai - Russia (Chita, Amur, Primorye, Khabarovsk), China (Inner Mongolia, Hebei, Hubei, Sichuan, Henan, Anhui, Zhejiang, Ningxia, Heilongjiang, Jilin, Liaoning), Mongolia, Japan, Korea
- Synurus excelsus (Makino) Kitam. - Japan, Korea
- Synurus palmatopinnatifidus (Makino) Kitam. - Japan, Korea
- Synurus pungens (Franch. & Sav.) Kitam. - Japan

formerly included

see Olgaea

- Synurus diabolicus - Olgaea lomonossowii
