= Phalacrachena =

Scientific classification
- Kingdom: Plantae
- Clade: Tracheophytes
- Clade: Angiosperms
- Clade: Eudicots
- Clade: Asterids
- Order: Asterales
- Family: Asteraceae
- Subfamily: Carduoideae
- Tribe: Cardueae
- Subtribe: Centaureinae
- Genus: Phalacrachena; Iljin

Type species
- Phalacrachena inuloides (Fisch.) Iljin

Genus of flowering plants

Phalacrachena is a genus of Eurasian flowering plants in the tribe Cardueae within the family Asteraceae.

Species

- Phalacrachena calva (Ledeb.) Iljin - Altay, Kazakhstan, Uzbekistan, Mongolia
- Phalacrachena inuloides (Fisch.) Iljin - European Russia, Baltic States, Ukraine, Caucasus
