= Ancathia =

Scientific classification
- Kingdom: Plantae
- Clade: Embryophytes
- Clade: Tracheophytes
- Clade: Angiosperms
- Clade: Eudicots
- Clade: Asterids
- Order: Asterales
- Family: Asteraceae
- Subfamily: Carduoideae
- Tribe: Cardueae
- Subtribe: Onopordinae
- Genus: Ancathia; DC.
- Species: A. igniaria

Binomial name
- Ancathia igniaria (Spreng.) DC.

Synonyms
- Cirsium igniarium Spreng.; Carduus elegans Willd. ex Steud.; Carduus igniarius (Spreng.) Pall. ex DC.; Cnicus igniarius (Spreng.) Benth. & Hook.f.; Cirsium elegans Willd. ex Spreng.

Genus of flowering plants

Ancathia is a genus of flowering plants in the family Asteraceae.

The only known species is Ancathia igniaria, native to Mongolia, Xinjiang, Altay, Kazakhstan, Uzbekistan, and Azerbaijan.
