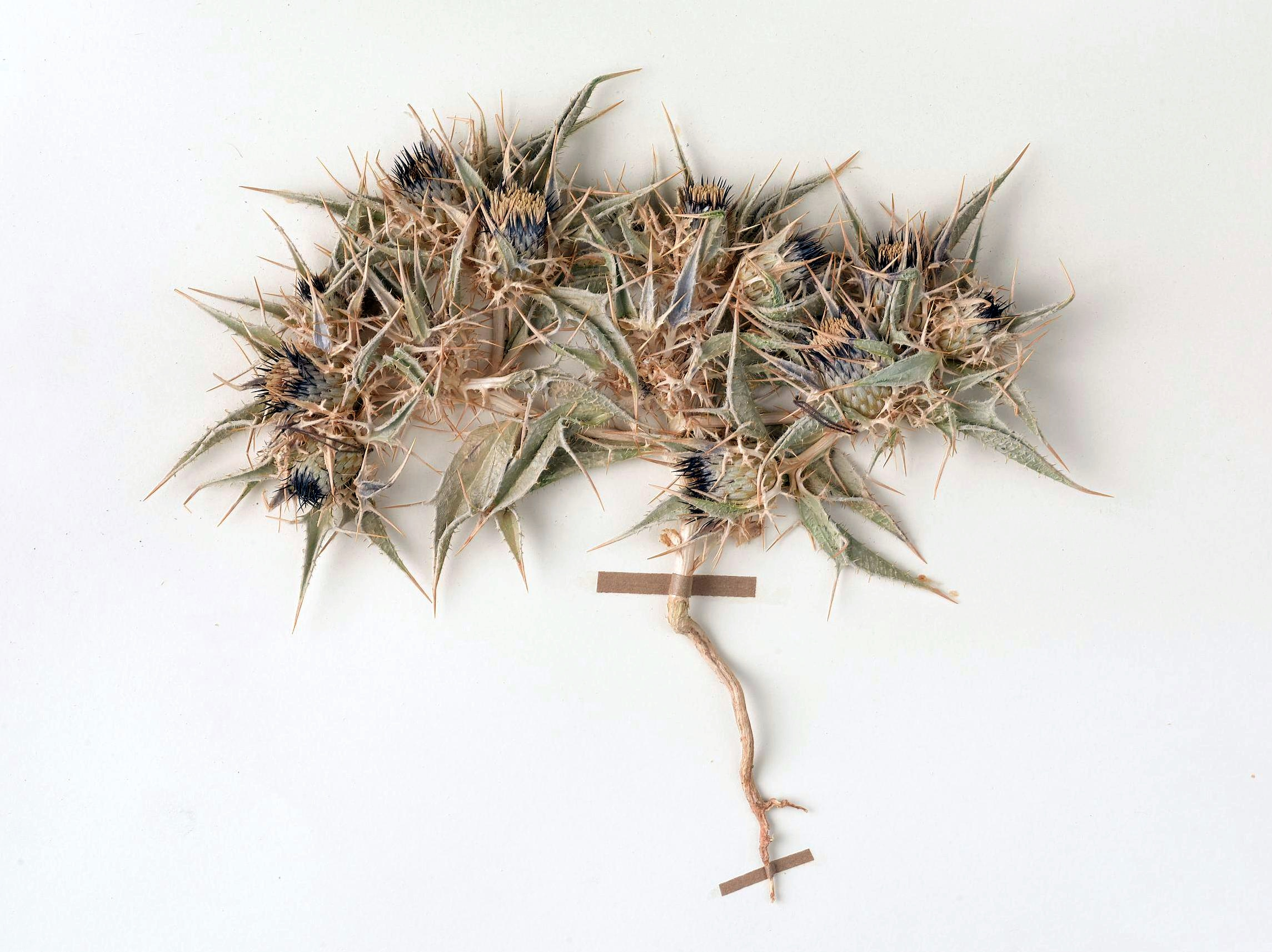
- Thevenotia scabra

Scientific classification
- Kingdom: Plantae
- Clade: Tracheophytes
- Clade: Angiosperms
- Clade: Eudicots
- Clade: Asterids
- Order: Asterales
- Family: Asteraceae
- Subfamily: Carduoideae
- Tribe: Cardueae
- Subtribe: Carlininae
- Genus: Thevenotia; DC.

Type species
- Thevenotia persica DC.

= Thevenotia =

Genus of plants

Thevenotia is a genus of Asian plants in the tribe Cardueae within the family Asteraceae which found in western and central Asia.

Species

- Thevenotia persica DC. - Afghanistan, Iran
- Thevenotia scabra (Boiss.) Boiss. - Afghanistan, Iran, Kyrgyzstan, Uzbekistan, Kazakhstan
