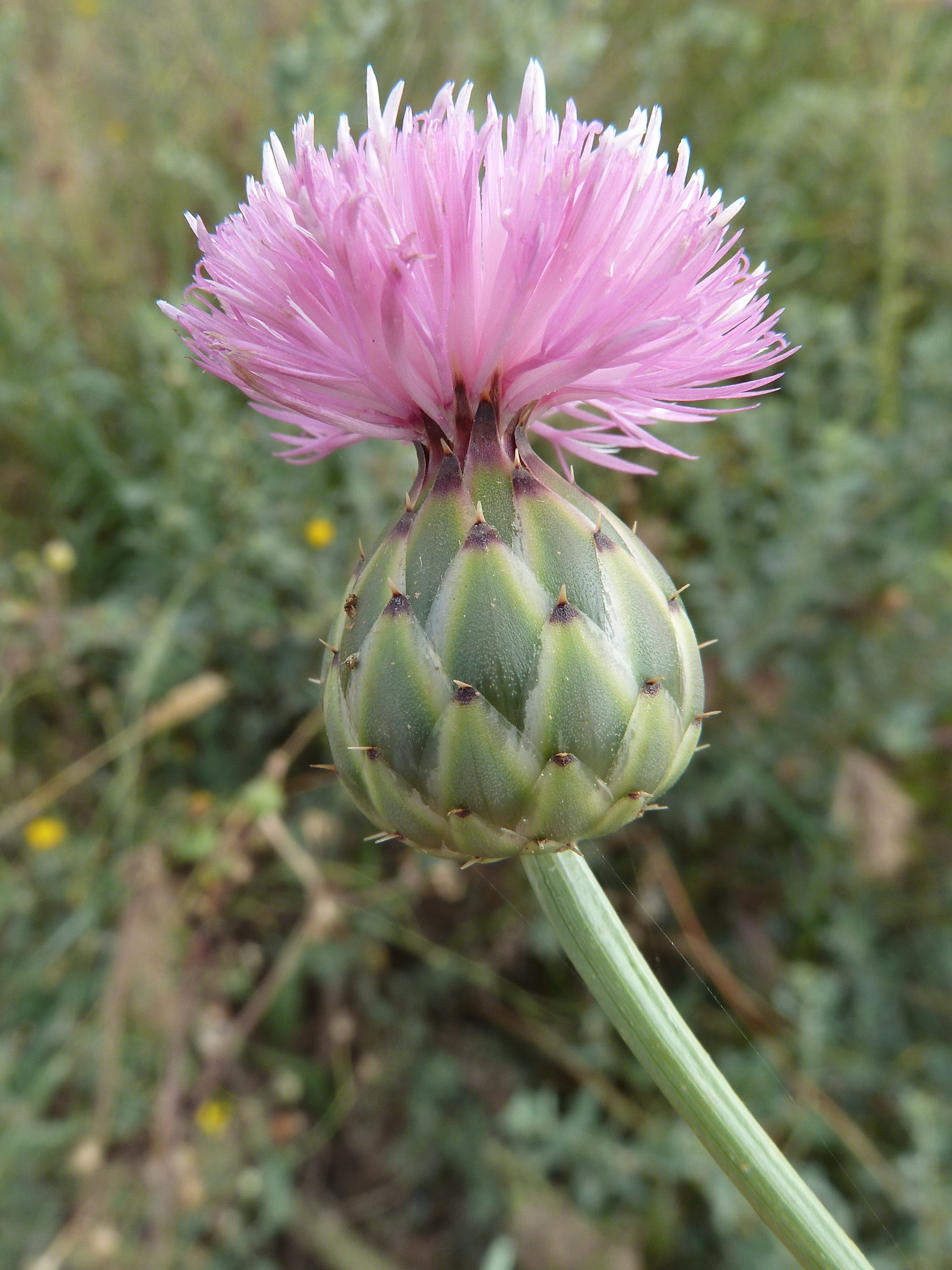
- A dagger flower, Mantisalca salmantica, in Albatera Alicante, Spain.

Scientific classification
- Kingdom: Plantae
- Clade: Tracheophytes
- Clade: Angiosperms
- Clade: Eudicots
- Clade: Asterids
- Order: Asterales
- Family: Asteraceae
- Subfamily: Carduoideae
- Tribe: Cardueae
- Subtribe: Centaureinae
- Genus: Mantisalca; Cass.

Type species
- Mantisalca salmantica (L.) Briq. & Cavill.

Synonyms
- Centaurea subgenus Mantisalca Cass.

= Mantisalca =

Genus of flowering plants

Mantisalca is a genus of plants in the tribe Cardueae within the family Asteraceae, it contains six described species.

== Description ==
Annual or biennial herbs growing between 50 cm to 1.3 metres in size. Herbage is not spiny.

=== Morphology ===
The stems are erect, strongly branched, longitudinal parallel lines (striate) with wings on stem absent.

Leaves grow around the base (basal) and along the stem (cauline). Leaves are without spines. Basal leaves dissected to the midrib with the leave segments merging (confluent) at the midrib (pinnatisect). Stem leaves sparse, much reduced, very narrow in length with parallel sides (linear) and toothed, with the teeth pointing towards the leaf tip (serrate).

Flower heads are solitary with ray-florets absent and receptacle scales present. Involcural bracts are ovoid to spheric in shape, 10 to 15 mm in diameter. The bracts are in several series, up to eight in number, ending in a short deciduous spines or with a short sharp point (mucronate).

== Distribution and habitat ==
Mantisalca occurs primarily in northern Africa, southern Europe and Turkey. One species, Mantisalca salmantica, is naturalised in Australia.

== Taxonomy ==
=== Etymology ===
Mantisalca is the anagram of the type species epithet salmantica.

== Species ==
Species

- Mantisalca amberboides (Caball.) Maire - Morocco
- Mantisalca cabezudoi E.Ruíz & Devesa
- Mantisalca delestrii Briq. & Cavill. - Morocco, Algeria
- Mantisalca duriaei Briq. & Cavill. - France, Spain, Italy
- Mantisalca salmantica (L.) Briq. & Cavill. - widespread from Britain + Morocco to Palestine
- Mantisalca spinulosa (Rouy) E.Ruíz & Devesa

Selected hybrids include:

- Mantisalca × castroviejoi E.Ruíz & Devesa

== Bibliography ==
- Cassini, Henri (1818). Société Philomathique de Paris (ed.). Bulletin des sciences (in French). Vol. 2. Paris: Plassan. pp. 141–144.
- Orchard, Anthony E. (2015). Flora of Australia (PDF). Mantisalca. Vol. 37. Melbourne: ABRS/CSIRO. p. 73.
- Keil, David (2006). Flora of North America Editorial Committee (ed.). Flora of North America North of Mexico. Mantisalca. Vol. 19. New York and Oxford: Oxford University Press. p. 173.
- Stanley, Trevor D.; Ross, Estelle M. (1986). Flora of south-eastern Queensland. Vol. 2. Brisbane, Australia: Queensland Dept. of Primary Industries. ISBN 9780724217601.
