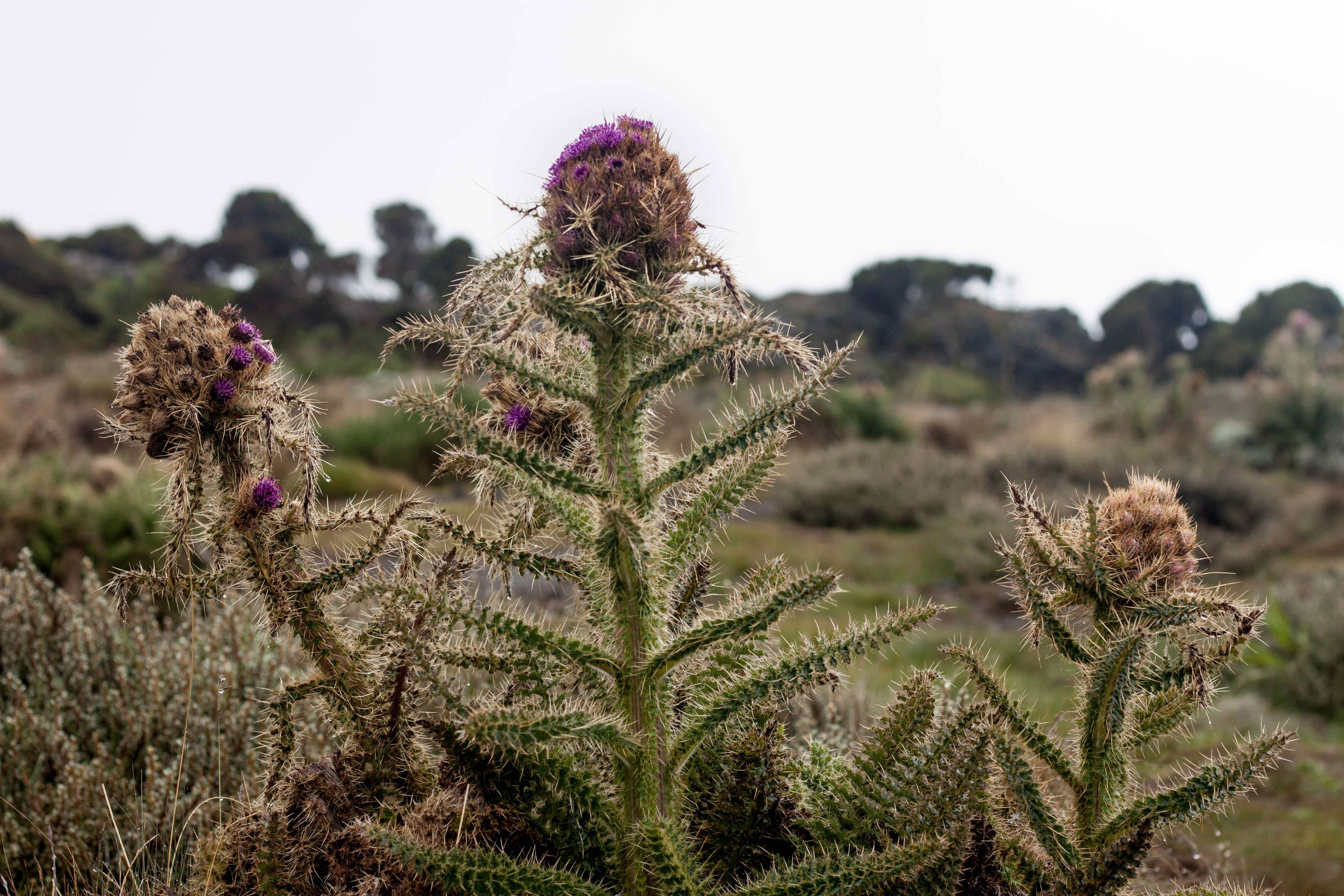
- Afrocarduus keniensis

Scientific classification
- Kingdom: Plantae
- Clade: Tracheophytes
- Clade: Angiosperms
- Clade: Eudicots
- Clade: Asterids
- Order: Asterales
- Family: Asteraceae
- Subfamily: Carduoideae
- Tribe: Cardueae
- Subtribe: Carduinae
- Genus: Afrocarduus (Kazmi) N.Garcia, Moreyra & Susanna (2023)

Type species
- Afrocarduus leptacanthus (Fresen.) N.Garcia, Moreyra & Susanna

Species
- 10; see text

Synonyms
- Carduus subgenus Afrocarduus Kazmi (1963)

= Afrocarduus =

Genus of flowering plants

Afrocarduus is a genus of flowering plants in the sunflower family, Asteraceae. It includes ten species of thistles native to the mountains of tropical Africa, ranging from Nigeria to Ethiopia and Zimbabwe.

All the species in the genus are native to Afromontane or Afroalpine regions of Africa, ranging from 1600 and 4600 meters elevation. Some are restricted to a single mountain or mountain range, while others are native to two or more ranges, some widespread.

The species now placed in genus Afrocarduus were previously placed in genus Carduus as subgenus Afrocarduus. The sub-Saharan African species have morphological and karyological features of genera Carduus and Cirsium. A phylogenetic study by Moreyra et al. concluded that these African species formed a clade distinct from Carduus and Cirsium, and sister to the newly described genus Afrocirsium.

== Species ==
Ten species are accepted.

- Afrocarduus afromontanus (R.E.Fr.) N.Garcia, Moreyra & Susanna – Kenya (Mount Kenya and Aberdare Range) and Uganda
- Afrocarduus keniensis (R.E.Fr.) N.Garcia, Moreyra & Susanna – Kenya (Mount Elgon and Mount Kenya), Tanzania (Kilimanjaro), and Uganda
- Afrocarduus kikuyorum (R.E.Fr.) N.Garcia, Moreyra & Susanna – Albertine Rift mountains of eastern Democratic Republic of the Congo, western Uganda, and Rwanda; Southern Highlands and Kilimanjaro in Tanzania; Mount Nyiru in Kenya
- Afrocarduus leptacanthus (Fresen.) N.Garcia, Moreyra & Susanna – Ethiopia; Albertine Rift of Democratic Republic of the Congo, Rwanda, Burundi, and Uganda; Southern Highlands in Tanzania; Mau Escarpment in Kenya
- Afrocarduus macracanthus (Kazmi) N.Garcia, Moreyra & Susanna – Ethiopian Highlands in Ethiopia
- Afrocarduus millefolius (R.E.Fr.) N.Garcia, Moreyra & Susanna – Mount Kenya in Kenya
- Afrocarduus nyassanus (S.Moore) N.Garcia, Moreyra & Susanna – Nigeria and Cameroon to Ethiopia and Zimbabwe
- Afrocarduus ruwenzoriensis (S.Moore) N.Garcia, Moreyra & Susanna – Ruwenzori Mountains of eastern Democratic Republic of the Congo and Uganda
- Afrocarduus schimperi (Sch.Bip.) N.Garcia, Moreyra & Susanna – Ethiopia and South Sudan to Uganda, Kenya, Tanzania, and Democratic Republic of the Congo
- Afrocarduus silvarum (R.E.Fr.) N.Garcia, Moreyra & Susanna – Kenya
