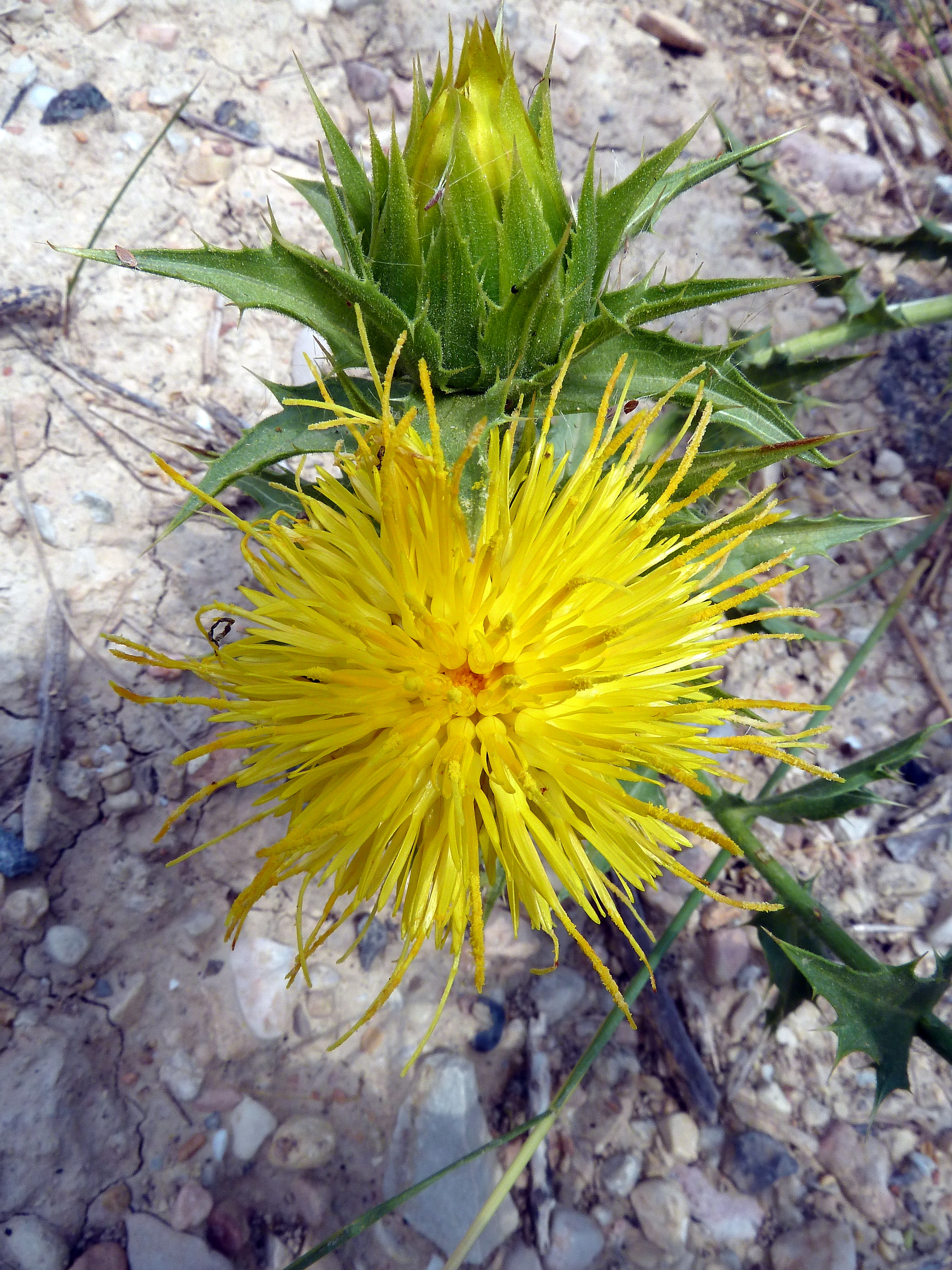
- Phonus arborescens

Scientific classification
- Kingdom: Plantae
- Clade: Tracheophytes
- Clade: Angiosperms
- Clade: Eudicots
- Clade: Asterids
- Order: Asterales
- Family: Asteraceae
- Subfamily: Carduoideae
- Tribe: Cardueae
- Subtribe: Centaureinae
- Genus: Phonus; Hill

Synonyms
- Heracantha Hoffmanns. & Link

= Phonus =

Genus of flowering plants

Phonus is a genus of flowering plants in the family Asteraceae. It includes four species native to the Mediterranean basin, Macaronesia, western and Central Asia, the Caucasus, Ukraine, and southern European Russia.

== Species ==
Four species are accepted.

- Phonus arborescens (L.) G.López
- Phonus lanatus (L.) Hill
- Phonus mareoticus (Delile) G.López
- Phonus rhiphaeus (Font Quer & Pau) G.López
