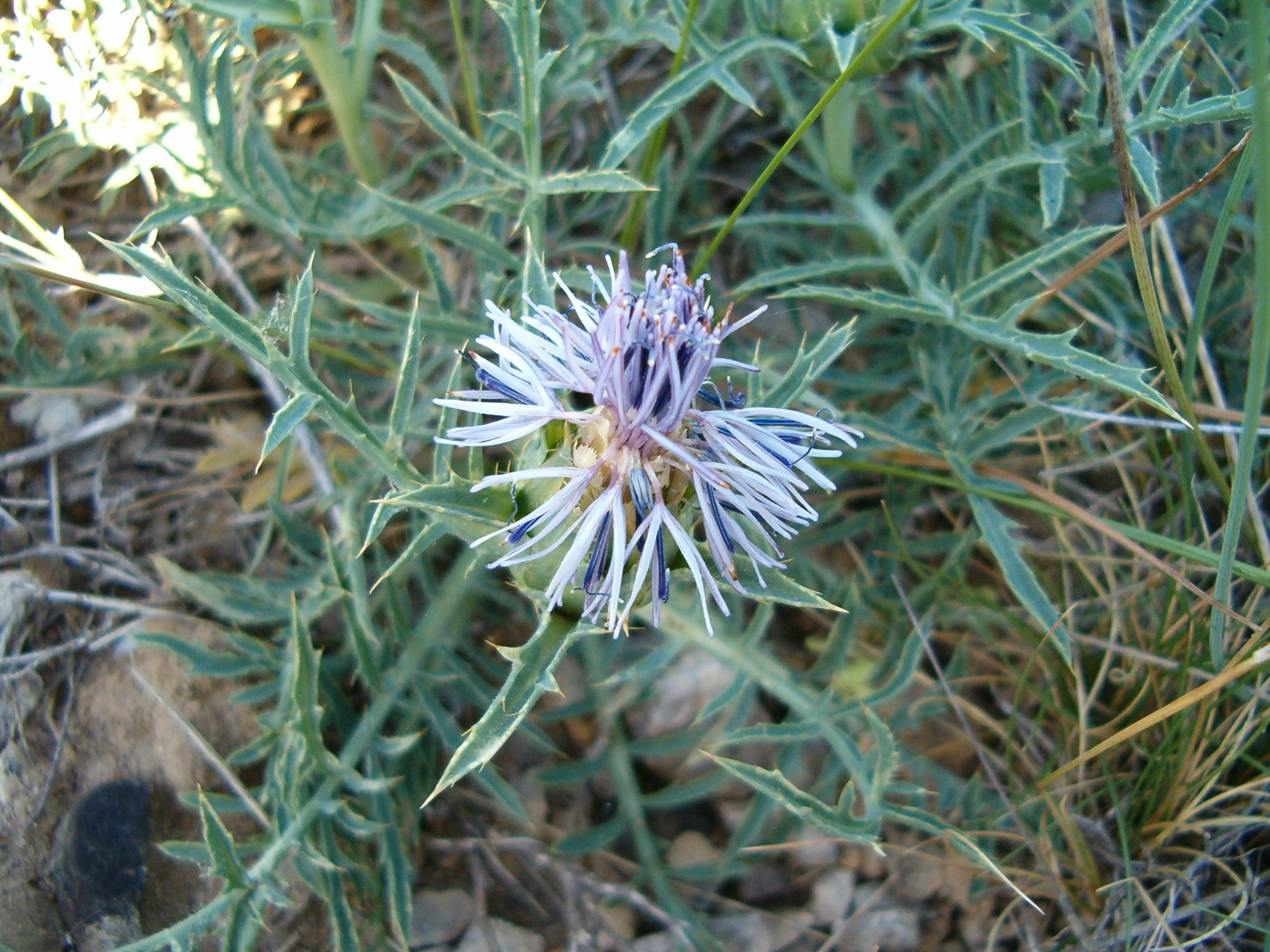
- Carduncellus monspeliensium

Scientific classification
- Kingdom: Plantae
- Clade: Embryophytes
- Clade: Tracheophytes
- Clade: Angiosperms
- Clade: Eudicots
- Clade: Asterids
- Order: Asterales
- Family: Asteraceae
- Subfamily: Carduoideae
- Tribe: Cardueae
- Subtribe: Centaureinae
- Genus: Carduncellus; Adans.

Synonyms
- Carthamodes Manetti ex Kuntze; Lamottea Pomel; Onobroma Gaertn.; Carthamoides Wolf

= Carduncellus =

Genus of flowering plants

Carduncellus is a genus of flowering plants in the tribe Cardueae within the family Asteraceae. They are native to the western Mediterranean and surrounding regions.

The taxonomy of the genus is still unclear. It is closely related to the genus Carthamus, and the two groups have been treated as part of a species complex, with the boundaries between them not established. While some sources accept several names in Carduncellus, others are more restrictive, and some consider the genus to be synonymous with Carthamus, the genus that includes the safflower.

Accepted species

- Carduncellus coeruleus C.Presl - Italy
- Carduncellus hispanicus Boiss. - Spain
- Carduncellus mairei Hanelt - Algeria
- Carduncellus monspeliensis St.-Lag. - Provence, Liguria
