= Xanthopappus =

Scientific classification
- Kingdom: Plantae
- Clade: Embryophytes
- Clade: Tracheophytes
- Clade: Angiosperms
- Clade: Eudicots
- Clade: Asterids
- Order: Asterales
- Family: Asteraceae
- Tribe: Cardueae
- Subtribe: Onopordinae
- Genus: Xanthopappus; C.Winkler
- Species: X. subacaulis

Binomial name
- Xanthopappus subacaulis C.Winkler

Synonyms
- Carduus euosmus Forrest ex W.W.Sm.; Xanthopappus multicephalus Ling

Genus of flowering plants

Xanthopappus is a genus of Chinese flowering plants in the tribe Cardueae within the family Asteraceae.

Species

The only known species is Xanthopappus subacaulis, native to the Provinces of Gansu, Inner Mongolia, Ningxia, Qinghai, Sichuan, and Yunnan.
