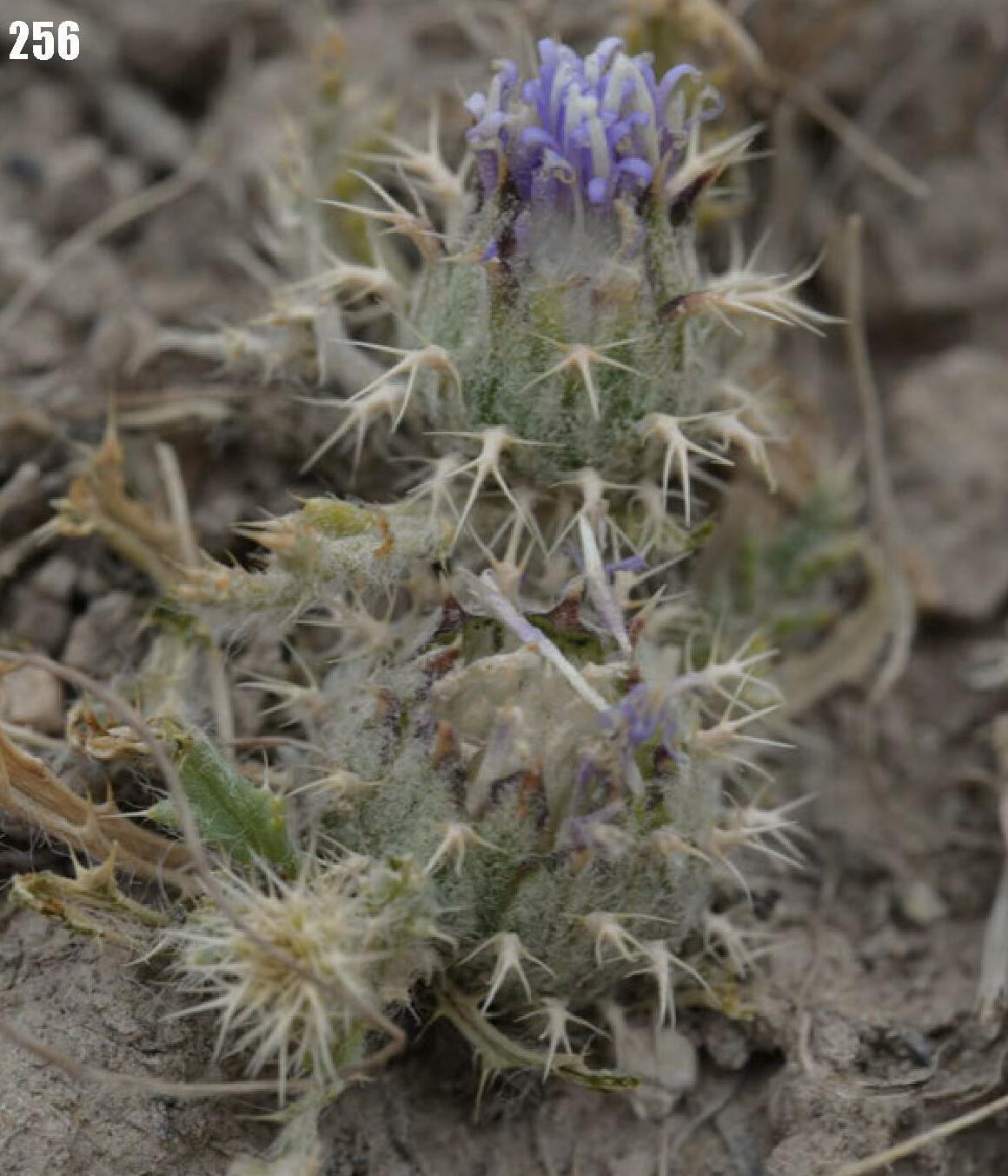

Scientific classification
- Kingdom: Plantae
- Clade: Tracheophytes
- Clade: Angiosperms
- Clade: Eudicots
- Clade: Asterids
- Order: Asterales
- Family: Asteraceae
- Subfamily: Carduoideae
- Tribe: Cardueae
- Subtribe: Cardopatiinae
- Genus: Cousiniopsis; Nevski
- Species: C. atractyloides

Binomial name
- Cousiniopsis atractyloides (C.Winkler) Nevski

Synonyms
- Cardopatium atractyloides C.Winkl.; Broteroa atractylodes (C.Winkl.) Kuntze

= Cousiniopsis =

Genus of flowering plants

Cousiniopsis is a genus of flowering plants in the family Asteraceae.

There is only one known species, Cousiniopsis atractyloides, which is native to central Asia (Kazakhstan, Uzbekistan, Tajikistan, Kyrgyzstan, Afghanistan, Iran, and Turkmenistan).
