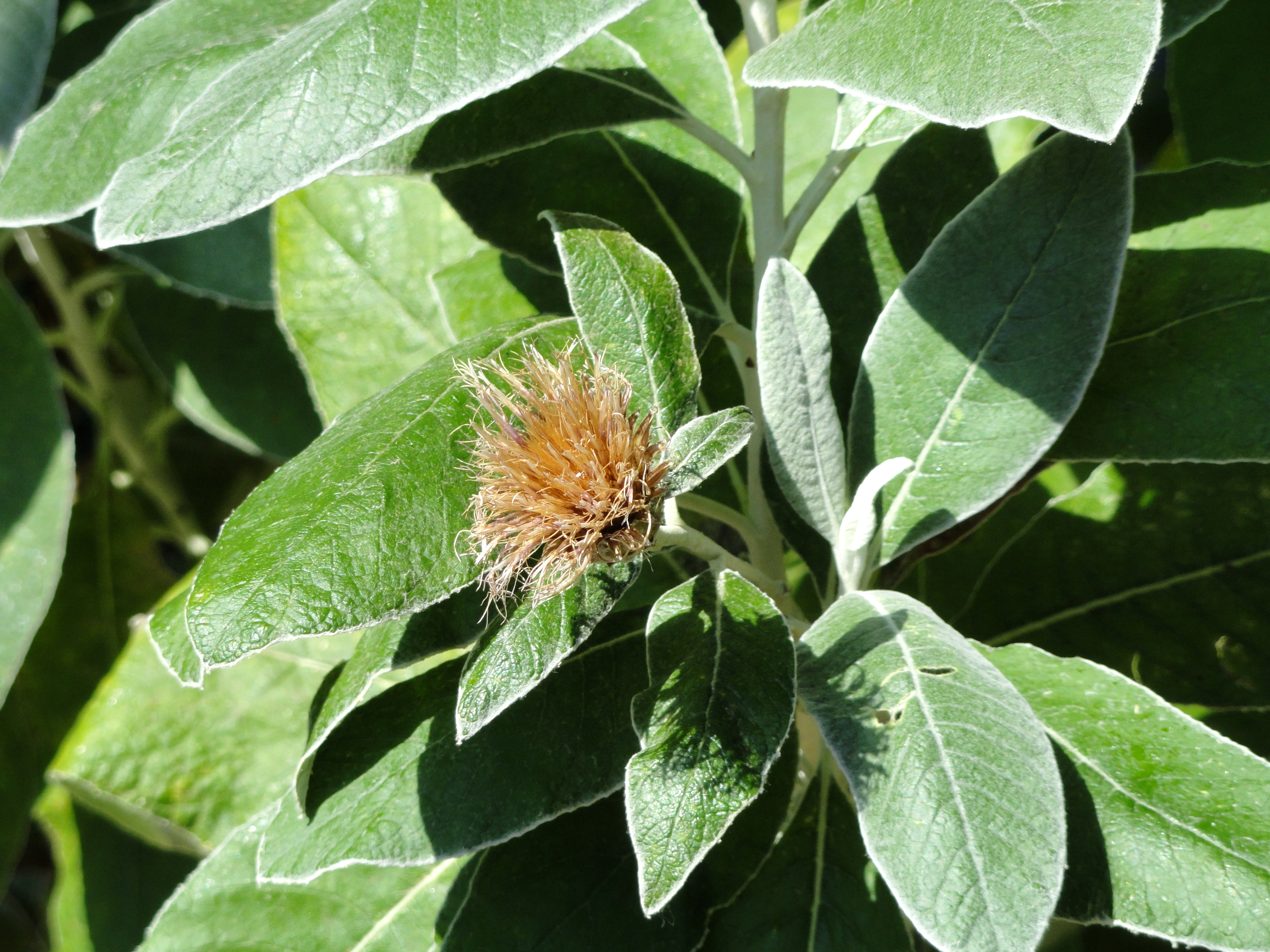

Scientific classification
- Kingdom: Plantae
- Clade: Embryophytes
- Clade: Tracheophytes
- Clade: Angiosperms
- Clade: Eudicots
- Clade: Asterids
- Order: Asterales
- Family: Asteraceae
- Subfamily: Carduoideae
- Tribe: Cardueae
- Subtribe: Centaureinae
- Genus: Centaurothamnus; G. Wagenitz et M. Dittrich
- Species: C. maximus

Binomial name
- Centaurothamnus maximus (Forsskål) G. Wagenitz et M. Dittrich

Synonyms
- Centaurea maxima Forssk.

= Centaurothamnus =

Genus of flowering plants

Centaurothamnus is a genus of flowering plants in the family Asteraceae.

There is only one known species, Centaurothamnus maximus, native to Yemen and Saudi Arabia.
