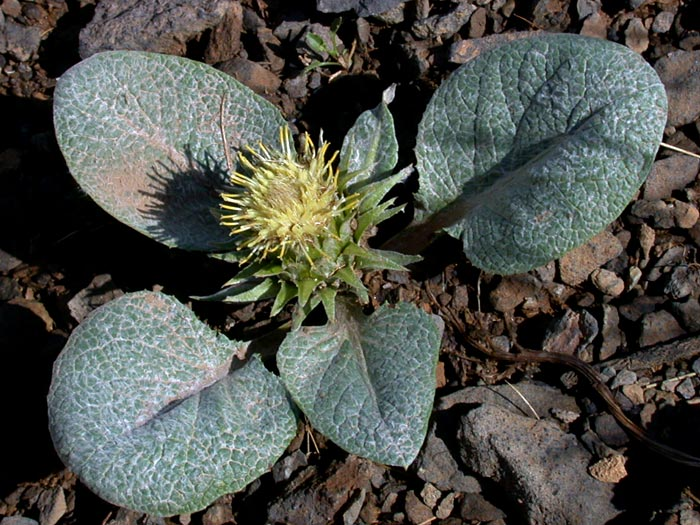

Scientific classification
- Kingdom: Plantae
- Clade: Tracheophytes
- Clade: Angiosperms
- Clade: Eudicots
- Clade: Asterids
- Order: Asterales
- Family: Asteraceae
- Tribe: Cardueae
- Subtribe: Berardiinae; Garcia-Jacas & Susanna
- Genus: Berardia; Vill.
- Species: B. lanuginosa

Binomial name
- Berardia lanuginosa (Lam.) Fiori & Paol.

Synonyms
- Arctium lanuginosum Lam.; Vilaria subacaulis Guett.; Berardia subacaulis Vill. 1779 not (Lam.) Fiori & Paol. 1904 (based on Arctium lanuginosum Lam. 1778)

= Berardia =

Genus of flowering plants

Berardia is a monotypic genus of flowering plants in the tribe Cardueae within the family Asteraceae, containing the single species Berardia lanuginosum. It is an alpine plant native to the Alps mountain ranges.
