= Dipterocome =

Scientific classification
- Kingdom: Plantae
- Clade: Tracheophytes
- Clade: Angiosperms
- Clade: Eudicots
- Clade: Asterids
- Order: Asterales
- Family: Asteraceae
- Subfamily: Carduoideae
- Tribe: Cardueae
- Subtribe: Dipterocominae; Garcia-Jacas & Susanna
- Genus: Dipterocome; Fisch. & C.A.Mey.
- Species: D. pusilla

Binomial name
- Dipterocome pusilla Fisch. & C.A.Mey.

Genus of flowering plants

Dipterocome is a genus of flowering plants in the family Asteraceae.

There is only one known species, Dipterocome pusilla, native to a large region extending from Greece and Israel to Kazakhstan.
