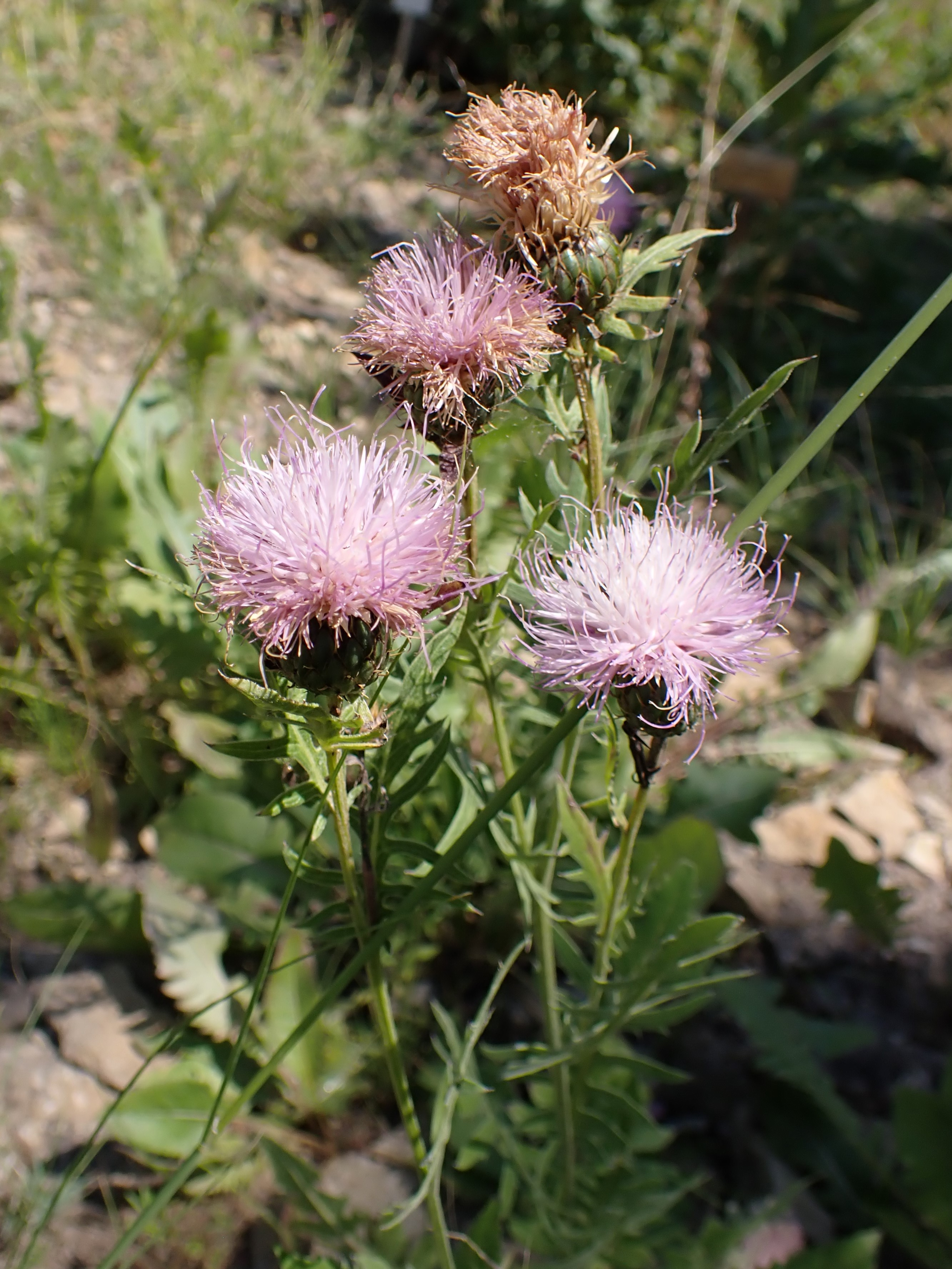
- Stizolophus balsamita at Berlin Botanical Garden

Scientific classification
- Kingdom: Plantae
- Clade: Tracheophytes
- Clade: Angiosperms
- Clade: Eudicots
- Clade: Asterids
- Order: Asterales
- Family: Asteraceae
- Subfamily: Carduoideae
- Tribe: Cardueae
- Subtribe: Centaureinae
- Genus: Stizolophus; Cass.

Species
- Stizolophus balsamita (Lam.) Cass. ex Takht.; Stizolophus balsamitoides (Post) Soják; Stizolophus coronopifolius Cass.; Stizolophus kermanensis (Bornm.) Soják

= Stizolophus =

Genus of plants

Stizolophus is a genus of flowering plants belonging to the family Asteraceae.

Its native range is Eastern Mediterranean to Central Asia and Afghanistan.
