= Nuriaea =

Scientific classification
- Kingdom: Plantae
- Clade: Tracheophytes
- Clade: Angiosperms
- Clade: Eudicots
- Clade: Asterids
- Order: Asterales
- Family: Asteraceae
- Subtribe: Carduinae
- Genus: Nuriaea; Susanna, Calleja & Moreyra (2023)

Type species
- Nuriaea engleriana (O.Hoffm.) Susanna, Calleja & Moreyra

Species
- Nuriaea dender (Friis) Susanna, Calleja & Moreyra; Nuriaea engleriana (O.Hoffm.) Susanna, Calleja & Moreyra

Genus of flowering plants

Nuriaea is a genus of flowering plants in the sunflower family, Asteraceae. It includes two species of thistles, Nuriaea dender and Nuriaea engleriana, which are endemic to Ethiopia.

They are spiny perennial herbs, growing 3 to 4 meters tall and occasionally up to 5 meters.

Both species are native to the Ethiopian Highlands, growing in Afromontane plant communities above 1,600 meters elevation.

These species were formerly placed in genus Cirsium. They have a plumose pappus like species of Cirsium and Afrocirsium. They differ from these other genera in their large size, and in having large capitula (4–7 cm) which resemble those of Cynara and a long (>30 mm) and strong (>2 mm wide) thorn on their basal leaf lobes. A phylogenetic and morphological study by Moreyra et al. published in 2023 concluded that these two species constituted a separate genus in tribe Carduinae which is a sister to the Carduus-Cirsium group of genera. The authors named the genus Nuriaea after their colleague Núria Garcia-Jacas, one of the co-authors of the paper which established the genus who died on 28 April 2023 before it was published.
