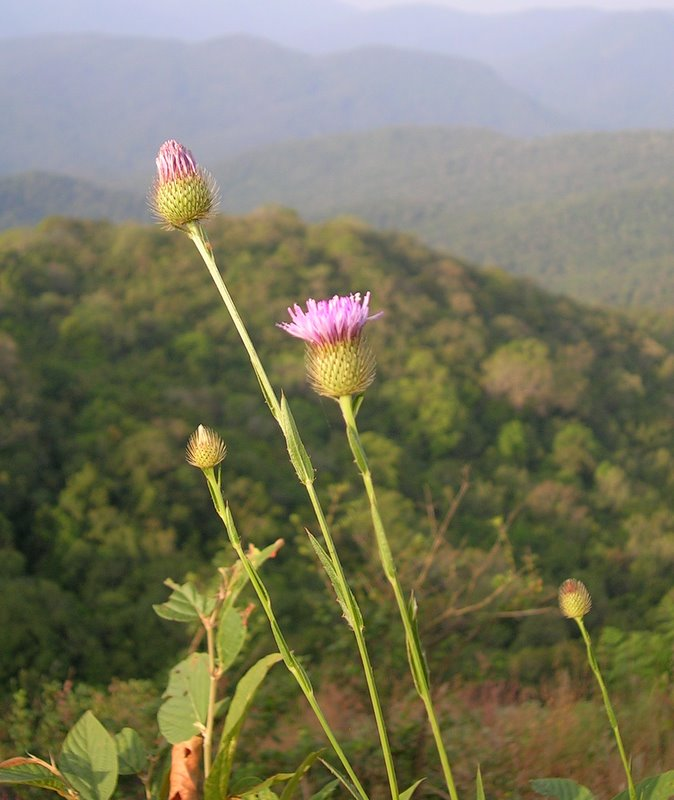
- Tricholepis amplexicaulis

Scientific classification
- Kingdom: Plantae
- Clade: Tracheophytes
- Clade: Angiosperms
- Clade: Eudicots
- Clade: Asterids
- Order: Asterales
- Family: Asteraceae
- Subfamily: Carduoideae
- Tribe: Cardueae
- Subtribe: Centaureinae
- Genus: Tricholepis; DC. 1833, not Kindb. 1899 (Meteoriaceae in Bryophyta)

Synonyms
- Achyropappus Fisch.

= Tricholepis =

Genus of flowering plants

Tricholepis is a genus of Asian flowering plants in the tribe Cardueae within the family Asteraceae.

Species

- Tricholepis amplexicaulis C.B.Clarke - Andhra Pradesh, Telangana, Maharashtra, Orissa, Tamil Nadu, Kerala, Gujarat, Karnataka
- Tricholepis angustifolia DC. - Kerala, Karnataka, Tamil Nadu
- Tricholepis chaetolepis (Boiss.) Rech.f. - Afghanistan
- Tricholepis eburnea Rech.f. - Afghanistan
- Tricholepis edmondsonii Rech.f. - Iran
- Tricholepis elongata DC. - Meghalaya, Andhra Pradesh, Telangana, Uttar Pradesh, Himachal Pradesh, Jammu-Kashmir
- Tricholepis furcata DC. - Tibet, Bhutan, Sikkim, Nepal
- Tricholepis glaberrima DC. - Andhra Pradesh, Telangana, Goa, Maharashtra, Tamil Nadu, Gujarat, Karnataka, Madhya Pradesh, Rajasthan
- Tricholepis karensium Kurz - Yunnan, Andhra Pradesh, Telangana, Laos, Assam, Sri Lanka, Tamil Nadu, Vietnam, Sikkim, Myanmar, Himachal Pradesh, Thailand, Jammu-Kashmir
- Tricholepis montana Dalzell & A.Gibson - Maharashtra, Andhra Pradesh, Telangana, Tamil Nadu
- Tricholepis nakaoi Kitam. - Meghalaya, Jammu-Kashmir, Nagaland
- Tricholepis radicans (Roxb.) DC. - Himachal Pradesh, Tamil Nadu, Karnataka, Uttar Pradesh, Andhra Pradesh, Telangana, Gujarat, Kerala, Maharashtra
- Tricholepis roylei Hook.f. - Himachal Pradesh
- Tricholepis stewartei C.B.Clarke ex Hook.f. - Punjab, Jammu-Kashmir
- Tricholepis stictophyllum C.B.Clarke - Uttaranchal, Madhya Pradesh, Myanmar, Uttar Pradesh
- Tricholepis tibetica Hook.f. & Thomson ex C.B.Clarke - Tibet, Afghanistan, Kashmir, Pakistan
- Tricholepis trichocephala Lincz. - Uzbekistan, Altai Krai, Tajikistan, Kyrgyzstan, Afghanistan, Kazakhstan

formerly included

see Amberboa

- Tricholepis procumbens - Amberboa ramosa
- Tricholepis raghavendrae - Klasea pallida
