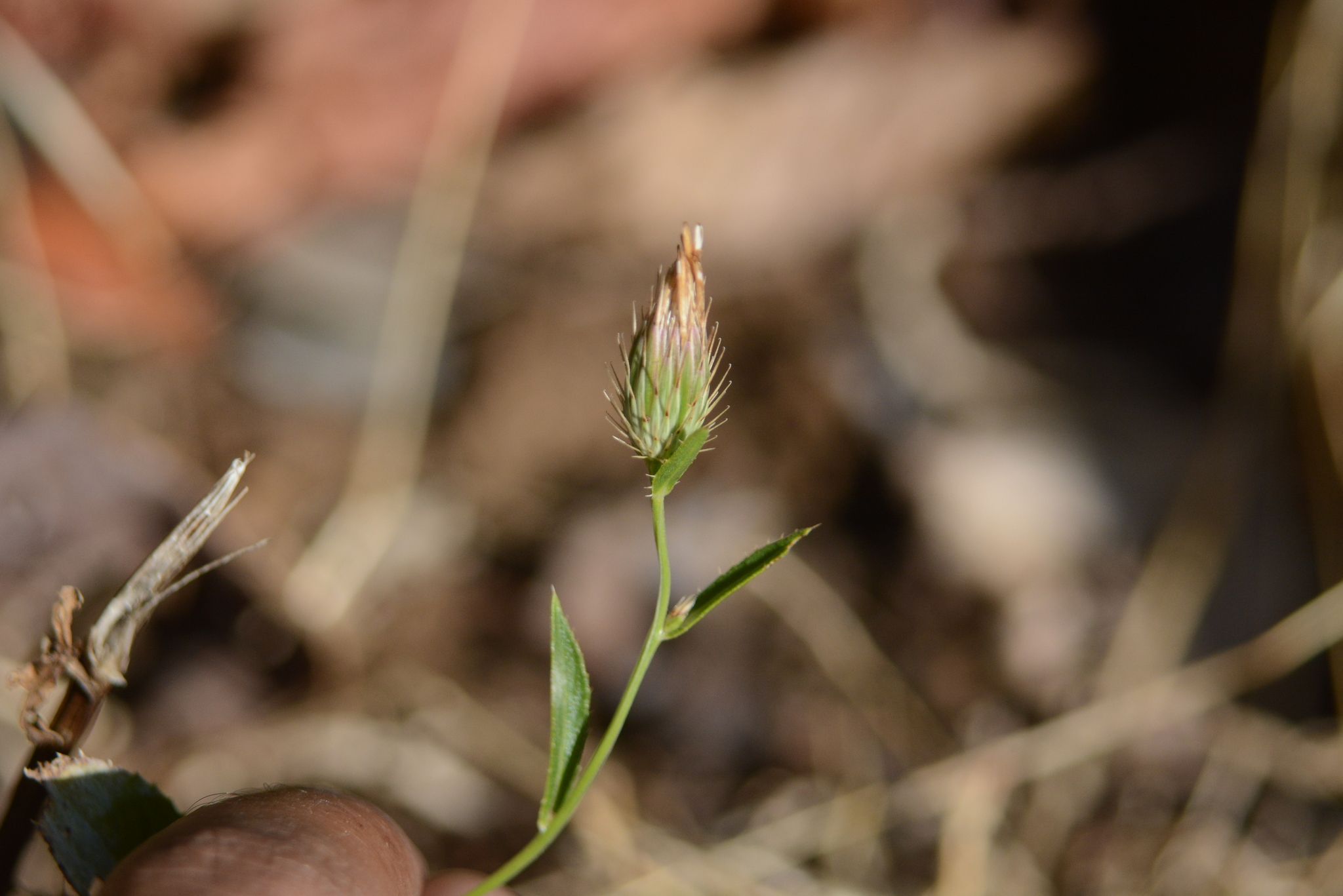
- Goniocaulon indicum in India

Scientific classification
- Kingdom: Plantae
- Clade: Tracheophytes
- Clade: Angiosperms
- Clade: Eudicots
- Clade: Asterids
- Order: Asterales
- Family: Asteraceae
- Subfamily: Carduoideae
- Tribe: Cardueae
- Subtribe: Centaureinae
- Genus: Goniocaulon; Cass.
- Species: G. indicum

Binomial name
- Goniocaulon indicum (Klein ex Willd.) C.B.Clarke

Synonyms
- Serratula indica Klein ex Willd.; Amberboa indica (Klein ex Willd.) DC.; Athanasia indica Roxb.; Goniocaulon glabrum Cass.

= Goniocaulon =

Genus of flowering plants

Goniocaulon is a genus of flowering plants in the family Asteraceae.

Species

There is only one known species, Goniocaulon indicum, native to India, Pakistan, Ethiopia, and Sudan.
