= Afrocirsium =

Scientific classification
- Kingdom: Plantae
- Clade: Tracheophytes
- Clade: Angiosperms
- Clade: Eudicots
- Clade: Asterids
- Order: Asterales
- Family: Asteraceae
- Subfamily: Carduoideae
- Tribe: Cardueae
- Subtribe: Carduinae
- Genus: Afrocirsium; Calleja, N.Garcia, Moreyra & Susanna (2023)

Type species
- Afrocirsium schimperi (Vatke) Calleja, N.Garcia, Moreyra & Susanna

Species
- Afrocirsium buchwaldii (O.Hoffm.) Calleja, N.Garcia, Moreyra & Susanna; Afrocirsium schimperi (Vatke) Calleja, N.Garcia, Moreyra & Susanna; Afrocirsium straminispinum (C.Jeffrey) Calleja, N.Garcia, Moreyra & Susanna

Genus of flowering plants

Afrocirsium is a genus of flowering plants in the sunflower family, Asteraceae. It includes three species of thistles native to the mountains of eastern tropical Africa.

They are spiny perennial herbs growing 0.5 to 2.5 meters tall. They have the plumose pappus characteristic of genus Cirsium, but have distinct characteristics like phyllaries with well-developed pectinate appendages which are not present in Cirsium and the other genera in the Carduus-Cirsium group.

All are native to Afromontane or Afroalpine regions of eastern tropical Africa between 1,600 and 4,600 meters elevation, ranging from South Sudan and Ethiopia to Zambia.

The species now placed in genus Afrocirsium were previously placed in genus Cirsium. The sub-Saharan African species have morphological and karyological features of genera Carduus and Cirsium. A phylogenetic study by Moreyra et al. concluded that these African species formed a clade distinct from Carduus and Cirsium, and sister to the newly described genus Afrocarduus.

== Species ==
Three species are accepted.

- Afrocirsium buchwaldii (O.Hoffm.) Calleja, N.Garcia, Moreyra & Susanna – South Sudan, Uganda, Kenya, Rwanda, Tanzania, and Zambia
- Afrocirsium schimperi (Vatke) Calleja, N.Garcia, Moreyra & Susanna – Ethiopia
- Afrocirsium straminispinum (C.Jeffrey) Calleja, N.Garcia, Moreyra & Susanna – Ethiopia
