= Syreitschikovia =

Scientific classification
- Kingdom: Plantae
- Clade: Tracheophytes
- Clade: Angiosperms
- Clade: Eudicots
- Clade: Asterids
- Order: Asterales
- Family: Asteraceae
- Subfamily: Carduoideae
- Tribe: Cardueae
- Subtribe: Onopordinae
- Genus: Syreitschikovia; Pavlov

Genus of plants

Syreitschikovia is a genus of flowering plants in the family Asteraceae.

Species

- Syreitschikovia spinulosa (Franch.) Pavlov - Uzbekistan, Kyrgyzstan, Tajikistan
- Syreitschikovia tenuifolia (Bong.) Pavlov - Xinjiang, Kazakhstan, Uzbekistan, Kyrgyzstan, Tajikistan
- Syreitschikovia tenuis (Bunge) Botsch. - Tarbagatai Mountains in Xinjiang + Kazakhstan
