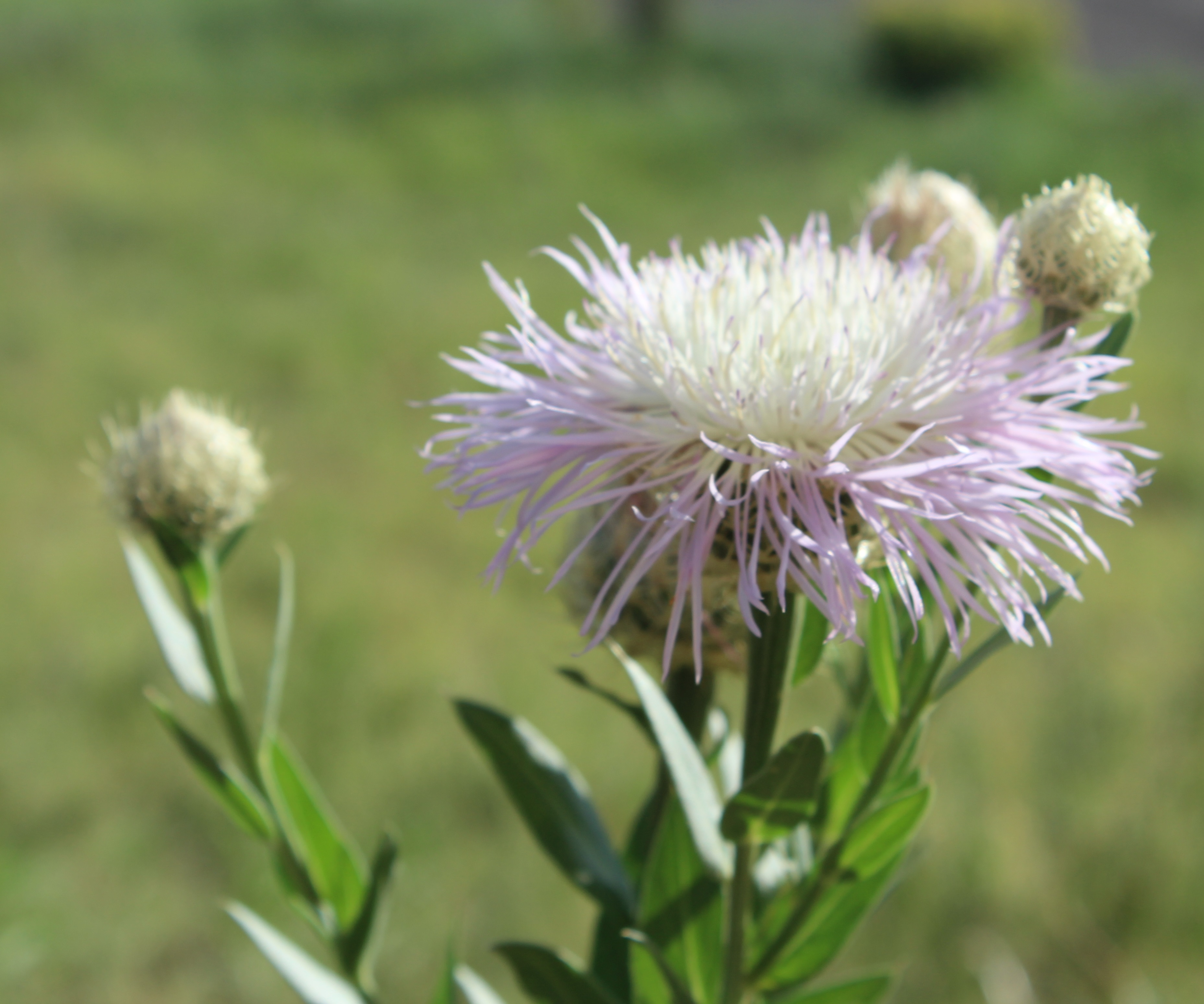
- Centaurea americana flower

Scientific classification
- Kingdom: Plantae
- Clade: Tracheophytes
- Clade: Angiosperms
- Clade: Eudicots
- Clade: Asterids
- Order: Asterales
- Family: Asteraceae
- Genus: Centaurea
- Species: C. americana

Binomial name
- Centaurea americana Nutt.

Synonyms
- Plectocephalus americanus (Nutt.) D.Don

= Centaurea americana =

Species of flowering plant

Centaurea americana, commonly called American starthistle or American basketflower, is an annual native to the southern central United States and northeastern Mexico. Its common name comes from the underside of the inflorescence, which has a basket weave pattern on it and on the flowerbuds.

The pink petals look somewhat like a thistle with a cream colored center. Blooms are 4 inches (10 cm) in diameter and are held from May until June. The plant can reach 5–6 ft (1.5–1.8 m) tall and has rough, lance-shaped leaves 4 inches (10 cm) long.

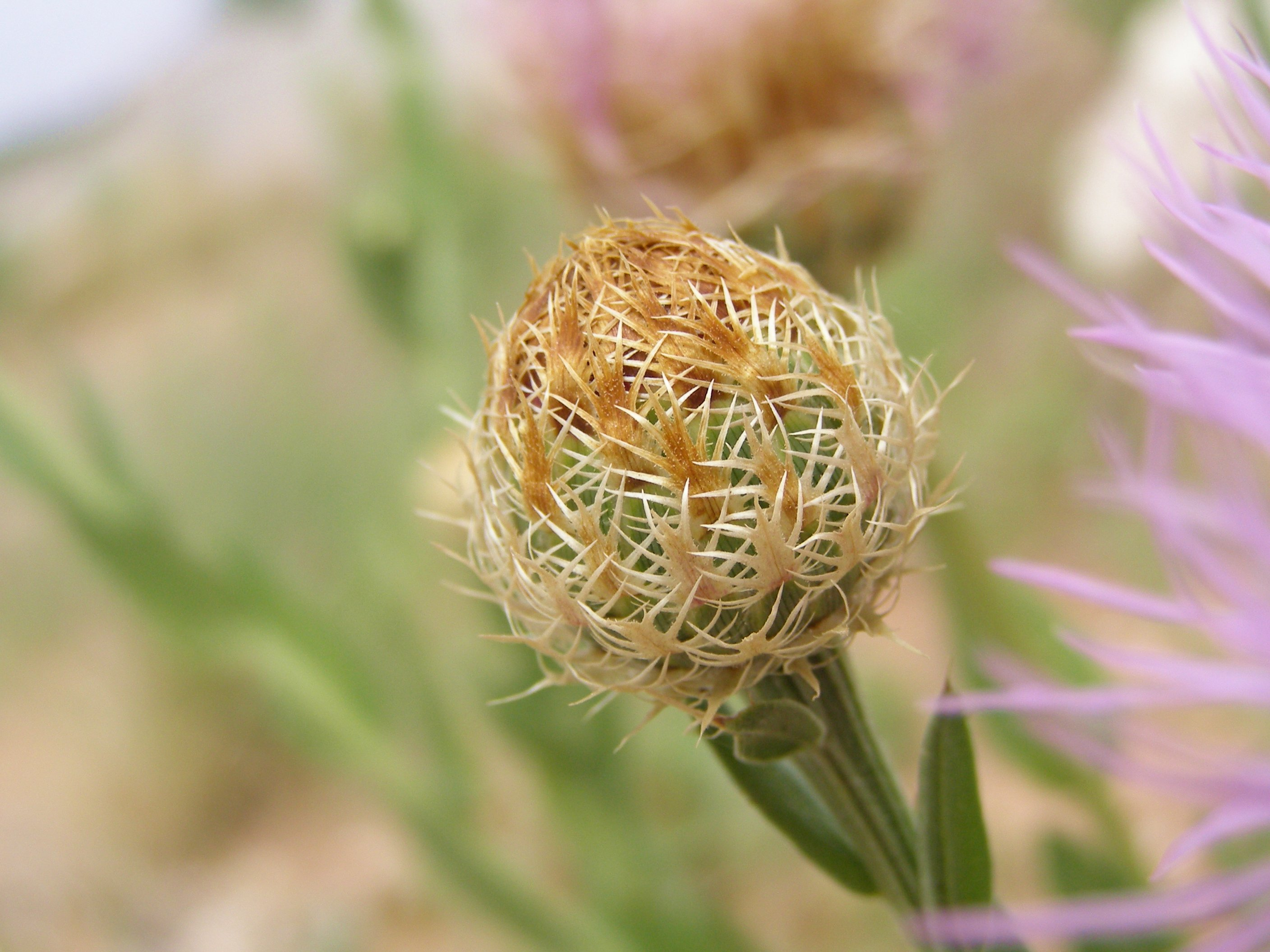
Flower bud showing basketwork appearance

The plant is often cultivated for its showy flowers, and can sometimes be found outside its native range as an escape from cultivation.
