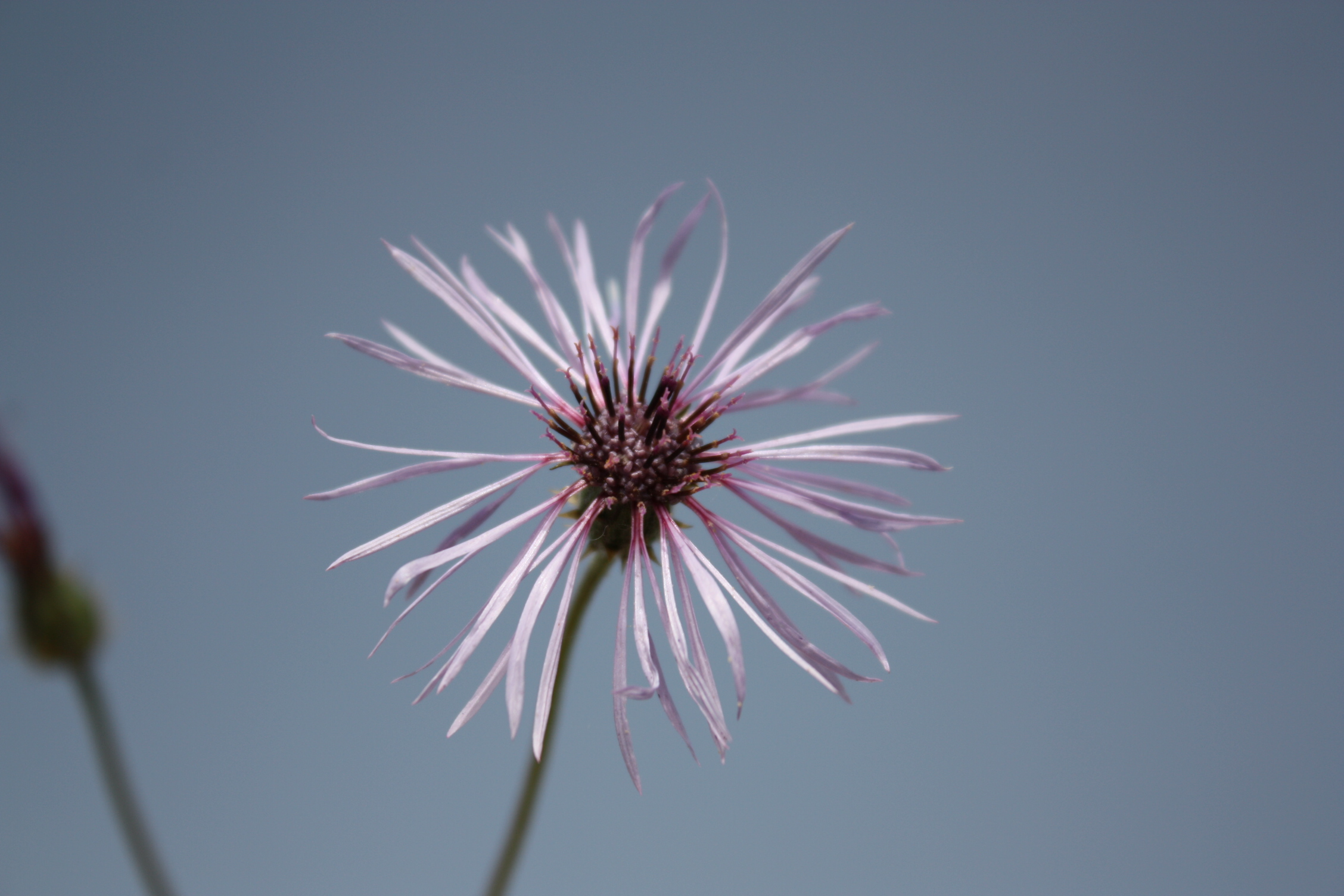
- Inflorescence of unidentified species in Morocco

Scientific classification
- Kingdom: Plantae
- Clade: Tracheophytes
- Clade: Angiosperms
- Clade: Eudicots
- Clade: Asterids
- Order: Asterales
- Family: Asteraceae
- Subfamily: Carduoideae
- Tribe: Cardueae
- Subtribe: Centaureinae
- Genus: Volutaria; Cass.

Type species
- Centaurea lippii L.

Synonyms
- Cyanopsis Cass.; Volutarella Cass., illegitimate superfluous name; Cyanastrum Cass.; Amberboi Adans.; Amberboia Kuntze

= Volutaria =

Genus of flowering plants

Volutaria is a genus of flowering plants in the family Asteraceae. They range from Iberia to the Near East and East Africa, but are most diverse in the Maghreb.

Species

- Volutaria abyssinica (A.Rich.) C.Jeffrey
- Volutaria albicaulis (Deflers) G.Wagenitz
- Volutaria belouinii (Humbert) Maire
- Volutaria bollei (Bolle) A.Hansen & G.Kunkel
- Volutaria boranensis (Cufod.) G.Wagenitz
- Volutaria canariensis G.Wagenitz
- Volutaria crupinoides (Desf.) Maire
- Volutaria dhofarica G.Wagenitz
- Volutaria djiboutensis G.Wagenitz
- Volutaria leucantha (Coss.) Maire
- Volutaria lippii (L.) Maire
- Volutaria maroccana (Barratte & Murb.) Maire
- Volutaria muricata (L.) Maire (Morocco knapweed)
- Volutaria ramosissima (Pitard) Sennen
- Volutaria saharae (Chevall.) Quezel & Santa
- Volutaria sinaica (DC.) G.Wagenitz
- Volutaria socotrensis G.Wagenitz
- Volutaria somalensis (Oliv. & Hiern) C.Jeffrey
- Volutaria tubuliflora (Murb.) Sennen
