= Olga Knorring =

Russian botanist (1887–1978)

- Born: 1887
- Died: 1978 (aged 90–91)
- Known for: Central Asian plants
- Scientific career
- Fields: Botany
- Author abbrev. (botany): Knorring

Olga Evertovna Knorring (1887–1978) was a Russian and Soviet botanist known for studying the plants of Central Asia.
