= Polytaxis (plant) =

Scientific classification
- Kingdom: Plantae
- Clade: Tracheophytes
- Clade: Angiosperms
- Clade: Eudicots
- Clade: Asterids
- Order: Asterales
- Family: Asteraceae
- Subfamily: Carduoideae
- Tribe: Cardueae
- Subtribe: Saussureinae
- Genus: Polytaxis; Bunge

Species
- See text

Genus of flowering plants

Polytaxis is a genus of Asian flowering plants belonging to the family Asteraceae.

Its native range is Central Asia to Afghanistan.

Species:

- Polytaxis lehmannii Bunge
- Polytaxis pulchella Rassulova & B.A.Sharipova
- Polytaxis winkleri Iljin
