= Russowia =

Scientific classification
- Kingdom: Plantae
- Clade: Tracheophytes
- Clade: Angiosperms
- Clade: Eudicots
- Clade: Asterids
- Order: Asterales
- Family: Asteraceae
- Subfamily: Carduoideae
- Tribe: Cardueae
- Subtribe: Centaureinae
- Genus: Russowia; C.Winkler
- Species: R. sogdiana

Binomial name
- Russowia sogdiana (Bunge) B.Fedtsch.

Synonyms
- Plagiobasis sogdiana Bunge; Russowia crupinoides C.Winkl.

Genus of plants

Russowia is a genus of Asian flowering plants in the tribe Cardueae within the family Asteraceae. The only known species is Russowia sogdiana, native to Kazakhstan, Kyrgyzstan, Xinjiang, Tajikistan, Uzbekistan, Afghanistan and Turkmenistan.
