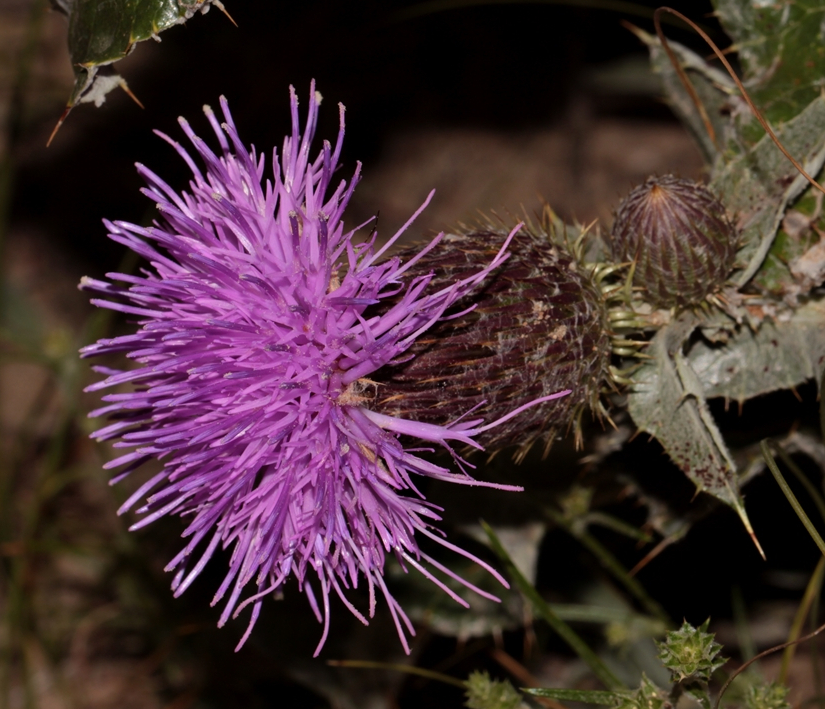
- Olgaea leucophylla in Inner Mongolia

Scientific classification
- Kingdom: Plantae
- Clade: Tracheophytes
- Clade: Angiosperms
- Clade: Eudicots
- Clade: Asterids
- Order: Asterales
- Family: Asteraceae
- Subfamily: Carduoideae
- Tribe: Cardueae
- Subtribe: Onopordinae
- Genus: Olgaea; Iljin

Synonyms
- Takeikadzuchia Kitag. & Kitam.

= Olgaea =

Genus of flowering plants

Olgaea is a genus of Asian plants in the tribe Cardueae within the family Asteraceae, having a typical thistle appearance.

In 1922, Modest Mikhaĭlovich Iljin (from the Botanical Garden of the Academy of Sciences of Soviet Russia) named the genus in honour of Russian botanist Olga Fedtschenko (1845–1921).

Olgaea's genome consists of a diploid number of 2n=26 chromosomes.

Species

- Olgaea altimurana (Rech.f.) Rech.f.
- Olgaea baldschuanica (C.Winkl.) Iljin
- Olgaea chodshamuminensis B.A.Sharipova
- Olgaea eriocephala (C.Winkl.) Iljin
- Olgaea lanipes (C.Winkl.) Iljin
- Olgaea leucophylla (Turcz.) Iljin
- Olgaea lomonossowii (Trautv.) Iljin
- Olgaea longifolia (C.Winkl.) Iljin
- Olgaea nidulans (Rupr.) Iljin
- Olgaea nivea (C.Winkl.) Iljin
- Olgaea pectinata Iljin
- Olgaea petri-primi B.A.Sharipova
- Olgaea roborowskyi Iljin
- Olgaea spinifera Iljin
- Olgaea tangutica Iljin
- Olgaea thomsonii (Hook.f.) Iljin
- Olgaea vvedenskyi Iljin
