= Family (disambiguation) =

A family is a domestic or social group.

Family or The Family may also refer to:

== Science ==
- Family (taxonomy), a level of scientific classification for organisms
- Family (periodic table), a group in the periodic table of elements
- Gene family, a set of similar genes resulting from gene duplications
- Protein family, a set of similar proteins resulting from gene duplications
- Tornado family, a series of tornadoes spawned by the same storm cell

== Mathematics ==
- Family of curves, a set of curves resulting from a function with variable parameters
- Family of sets, a collection of sets
- Indexed family, a family where each element can be given an index
- Normal family, a collection of continuous functions
- Parametric family, a family where elements are specified by a set of parameters

== Religion ==
- Holy Family of the Child Jesus, the Virgin Mary, and Saint Joseph
- Family International, a religious movement formerly called the Children of God
- The Family (Australian New Age group), a controversial Australian religious group
- The Family (Christian political organization), or the Fellowship, a Washington, D.C.–based American Christian group
- "The Family: A Proclamation to the World", a 1995 statement issued by the Church of Jesus Christ of Latter-day Saints

== Linguistics ==
- Language family, a group of languages related through descent from a common ancestral language

== Arts, entertainment, and media ==
=== Art ===
- The Family (Schiele), a 1918 oil painting by Egon Schiele
- A Family (painting), a 1951 oil on canvas by Louis le Brocquy
- The Family (Gross), a 1979 bronze sculpture in Manhattan, New York
- The Family (Puccetti), a 1982 steel statue in West Allis, Wisconsin
- Family (Blumenfeld), a 1983 public artwork by Helaine Blumenfeld, in Milwaukee, Wisconsin, U.S.

=== Films ===
- A Family (1943 film), a 1943 Soviet film
- The Family (1970 film) or Città violenta, an Italian crime film directed by Sergio Sollima
- The Family (1972 film), an Ivorian film directed by Henri Duparc
- The Family (1987 film) or La famiglia, an Italian film directed by Ettore Scola
- Family (1996 film), a 1996 Telugu drama
- Family (2001 film), a Takashi Miike film
- Family (2001 Dutch film), a 2001 Dutch drama
- A Family (2004 film), a South Korean film starring Soo Ae
- Family (2006 film), an Indian Hindi film
- A Family (2010 film), a Danish drama
- The Family (2013 film), a French action comedy directed by Luc Besson
- Families (2015 film), a French film
- Family: Ek Deal, Hindi title of the 2016 Indian Telugu film Nannaku Prematho
- The Family (2017 film), a Venezuelan film
- A Family (2017 film), an Italian film
- Family (2018 film), an American film
- A Family (2024 film), a French documentary directed by Christine Angot
- Family (2024 film), an American psychological horror film directed by Benjamin Finkel
- A Family (2026 film), a Dutch - Belgian drama film

=== Literature ===
- The Family (Shimazaki novel), 1911
- The Family (Ba Jin novel), 1933
- The Family, a 1971 book by Ed Sanders
- A Family, a 1978 play by Ronald Harwood
- The Family (Buchi Emecheta novel) (U.S.) or Gwendolen (UK), 1989
- Family (Cooper novel), 1991
- The Family (Puzo novel), 2001
- The Family: The Real Story of the Bush Dynasty, a 2004 book by Kitty Kelley
- The Family: The Secret Fundamentalism at the Heart of American Power, a 2008 book by Jeff Sharlet

=== Music ===
==== Groups ====
- Family (British band), a 1966–1973 English rock band
- Family (Spanish band), a 1990s pop band
- Family (Willie Nelson's band), Willie Nelson's recording and touring group
- The Family (band), an American R&B band formed by Prince
- The Family (songwriters), a Swedish songwriting and music production team
- The Family, an urban contemporary gospel choir led by Kirk Franklin

==== Albums ====
- Family (Ignite album), 1995
- Family (LeAnn Rimes album), 2007
- Family (Le Loup album), 2009
- Family (May J. album), 2009
- Family (Noah Gundersen EP), 2011
- Family (Roy Hargrove album), 1995
- Family (Think About Life album), 2009
- Family (Thompson album), 2014
- The Family (Brockhampton album), 2022
- The Family (The Family album), by the R&B band, 1985
- The Family (Mashmakhan album), 1971
- The Family, by Satchel, 1996

==== Songs ====
- "Family" (song), by the Chainsmokers and Kygo, 2019
- "Family" (SC3 song), 2017
- "Family", by Björk from Vulnicura
- "Family", by Dolly Parton from Eagle When She Flies, 1991
- "Family", by Ed Sheeran from No. 5 Collaborations Project
- "Family", by Joe Walsh from Analog Man
- "Family", by Hed PE from New World Orphans
- "Family", by Rodney Atkins from Take a Back Road
- "Family", by the Rolling Stones from Metamorphosis
- "Family", by TobyMac from Eye on It

=== Television ===
==== Channels ====
- AFN Family
- Freeform (TV channel), formerly ABC Family, an American television network
- Family Channel (Canadian TV network), a defunct Canadian kids' channel
- TVNZ Family, a programming block on TVNZ 6, New Zealand
- Family Television Network, a defunct New Zealand network of local television stations

==== Series ====
- Family (1976 TV series), a 1976–80 American drama series
- Family (1994 TV series), an Irish miniseries by Roddy Doyle
- Family (2003 TV series), a British crime drama
- Family (2012 TV series), a South Korean sitcom
- #Family (2018 TV series), a Ugandan sitcom
- Family: The Unbreakable Bond, a 2023 South Korean television series
- Family: the web series, an episodic 2008 web series
- Families (TV series), a 1990–93 British daytime soap opera
- The Family (1971 TV series), a 1971 Canadian drama television series
- The Family (1974 TV series), a British fly-on-the-wall documentary series
- The Family (2003 TV series), a 2003 American reality television show
- The Family (2008 TV series), a documentary series following British families
- The Family (2011 TV series), an Australian version of the British series
- The Family (2016 TV series), an American thriller/drama series
- The Family (miniseries), a 2019 American documentary series

==== Episodes and segments ====
- "Family" (Buffy the Vampire Slayer)
- "Family" (Domina)
- "Family" (House)
- "Family" (Masters of Horror), 2006
- "Family" (The Secret Circle)
- "Family" (Star Trek: The Next Generation)
- "Family" (Stargate SG-1)
- "Family" (The Walking Dead)
- "The Family" (sketch), from The Carol Burnett Show
- "Families", a Series F episode of the television series QI (2008)

=== Other uses in arts, entertainment, and media ===
- Family (musical instruments), a grouping of similar musical instruments
- The Family, a fictional group of aliens battled by the DC Comics character Metamorpho
- The Family, a professional wrestling tag team consisting of Tony D'Angelo, Channing "Stacks" Lorenzo, Luca Crusifino and Adriana Rizzo

== Groups and organizations ==
- Family (US Census), a group of related people residing together
- The Family (American crime organization), an NJ African-American crime organization founded by Akbar Pray
- The Family (Arkansas politics), a 19th-century American political coalition
- The Family (club), a private club formed in San Francisco in 1901
- "The Family", a group of 18th-century Carolina planters opposed by George Burrington
- "The Family", a 2005–06 American terrorist cell arrested in Operation Backfire
- "The Family", a gang responsible for the Family Murders in Adelaide, Australia
- Crime family, a name for crime organizations
- The Families, a gang in GTA San Andreas and GTA V
- The Fellowship (Christian organization), also known as "The Family"

== Other ==
- Family Butte, a landform in Utah, US

== See also ==
- Familia (disambiguation)
- Familial (disambiguation)
- La Familia (disambiguation)
