= La Familia =

La Familia (lit. "the family") may refer to:

== Film and television ==
- La Familia, or The Family (2017 film), a Venezuelan film
- La familia, a 1969 Mexican telenovela
- La Familia Cosmovision, a 2002–2014 American Spanish-language TV network

== Music ==
- La Familia (rap group), a Romanian hip hop group
- La Familia (album), a 2014 album by J Balvin
- "La Familia" (song), a 1995 song by Frost
- La Familia, a 2001 album by Djakout Mizik
- "La Familia", a 2016 song by Kevin Gates from Islah

== Other uses ==
- La Familia (Beitar supporters' group), an ultra supporters' group of Israeli football club Beitar Jerusalem
- La Familia (professional wrestling), a 2007–2009 WWE stable
- La Familia Michoacana, a Mexican drug cartel
- Las Meninas, or La Familia, a 1656 painting by Diego Velázquez
- La Familia, an NIL collective supporting Kentucky Wildcats men's basketball, and the Kentucky alumni team that competes in The Basketball Tournament

== See also ==
- Familia (disambiguation)
- Family (disambiguation)
- Sagrada Familia (disambiguation)
