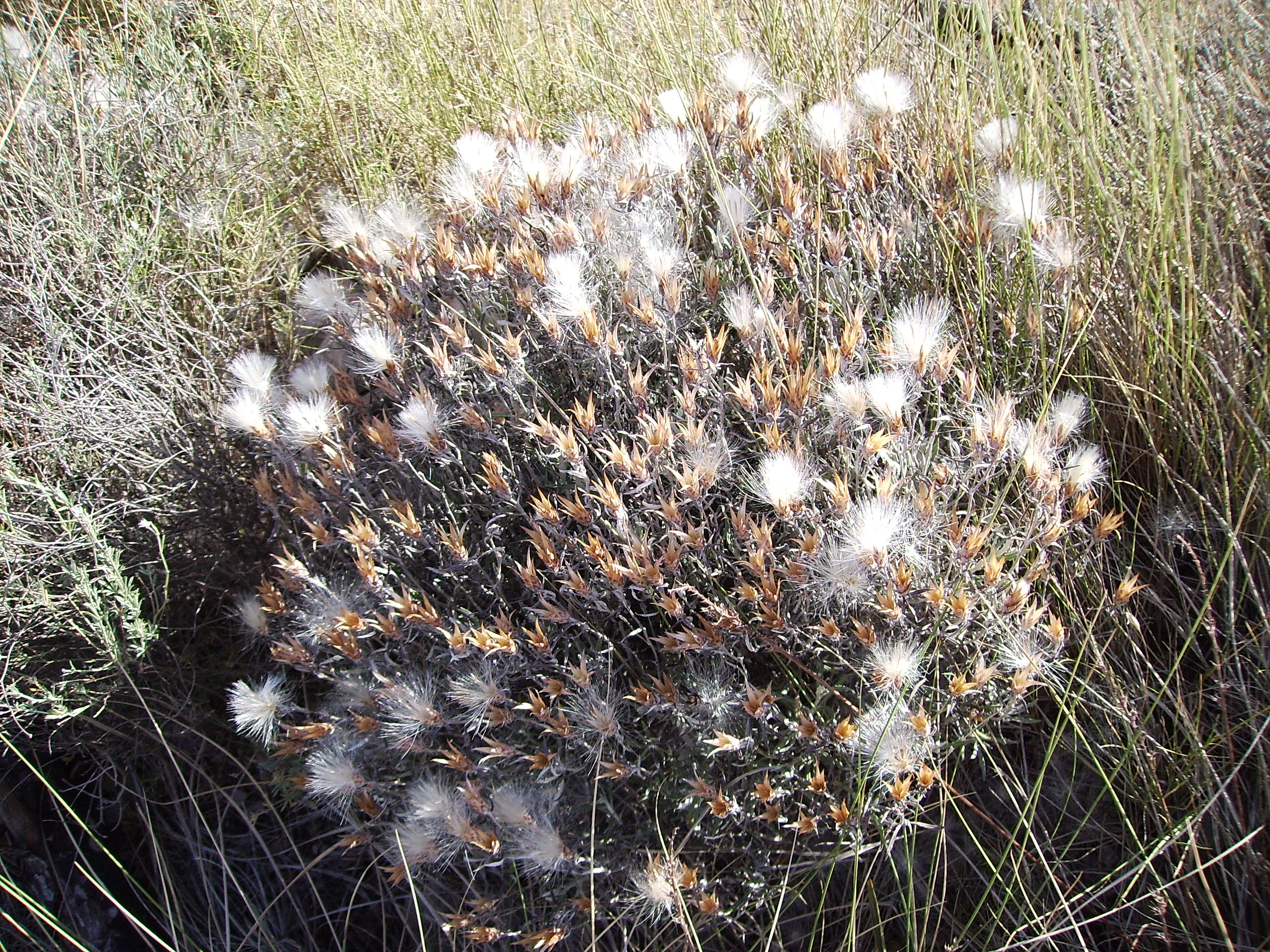
- Staehelina dubia

Scientific classification
- Kingdom: Plantae
- Clade: Tracheophytes
- Clade: Angiosperms
- Clade: Eudicots
- Clade: Asterids
- Order: Asterales
- Family: Asteraceae
- Subfamily: Carduoideae
- Tribe: Cardueae
- Subtribe: Staehelininae; Garcia-Jacas & Susanna
- Genus: Staehelina; L.

Type species
- Staehelina dubia L.

Synonyms
- Barbellina Cass.; Aplina Raf.

= Staehelina =

Genus of plants

Staehelina is a genus of Mediterranean flowering plants in the tribe Cardueae within the family Asteraceae.

== Species ==
- Staehelina dubia L. - western Mediterranean
- Staehelina petiolata (L.) Hilliard & B.L.Burtt - Crete + Karpathos Island
- Staehelina unifloscula Sibth. & Sm. - Greece, Macedonia

formerly included

several species now regarded as members of other genera: Athanasia Craspedia Cyrtocymura Gymnanthemum Hirtellina Jurinea Lachnospermum Liatris Ptilostemon Syncarpha Vernonia
