= Bill Miklich =

American football player (1919–2005)

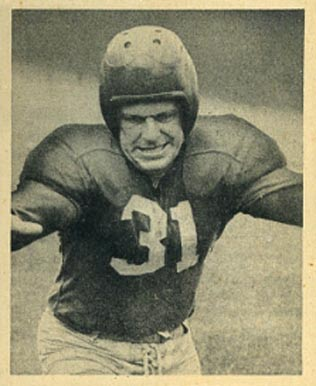

Profile
- Positions: Center, linebacker

Personal information
- Born: April 3, 1919; Greenwood, Wisconsin, US
- Died: March 10, 2005 (aged 85); Waukesha, Wisconsin, US

Career information
- College: University of Idaho

Career history
- 1947–1948: New York Giants
- 1948: Detroit Lions

William John Miklich (April 3, 1919 – March 10, 2005) was an American football player. He was a center and linebacker in the National Football League for the New York Giants and the Detroit Lions. He played college football at the University of Idaho. He was a World War II veteran of the U.S. Marines.

== Early life ==
Miklich attended West Allis High School in West Allis, Wisconsin, where he was named All-Conference in 1938. He also played quarterback and punter, and his coach Neil Gonyo described Miklich as the greatest fullback he ever coached at West Allis. He became the starting fullback and linebacker for the University of Idaho.
