= Matt Bullen =

British writer

Matt Bullen (born 1969) is an English writer and polyamory advocate.

== Biography ==
Born in Guildford, Surrey, Bullen was educated at the Royal Grammar School, Guildford and the University of Birmingham, UK. He co-wrote some Family: the web series episodes with Terisa Greenan. He has also written about polyamory for publications including The Idler. He has spoken about polyamorous parenting on national and international television, and other forums. He has been interviewed in publications including Details and City Living Seattle. The Newsweek feature that centered on his family, and on "Family: the web series", was listed as a Newsweek's Editors' Top Ten article in 2009. In June 2015, this article was cited by Chief Justice John Roberts as part of his dissent to the decision legalizing same-sex marriage in the USA.

Bullen has contributed articles on other subjects to publications including the Dancing Times and the Comedy Review and he conducted the last extensive interview with Monty Python's Graham Chapman.

On Christmas Eve 2018, he married Cecilia Capehart-Bullen in Kent, Washington, USA. Capehart-Bullen is a great granddaughter of the late U.S. Senator Homer E. Capehart.

In March 2021 they launched a podcast about their age-gap marriage, titled A Brit, A Brat, & A 25-Year Gap: A Seattle Age-Gap Marriage.
