= Women in Switzerland =

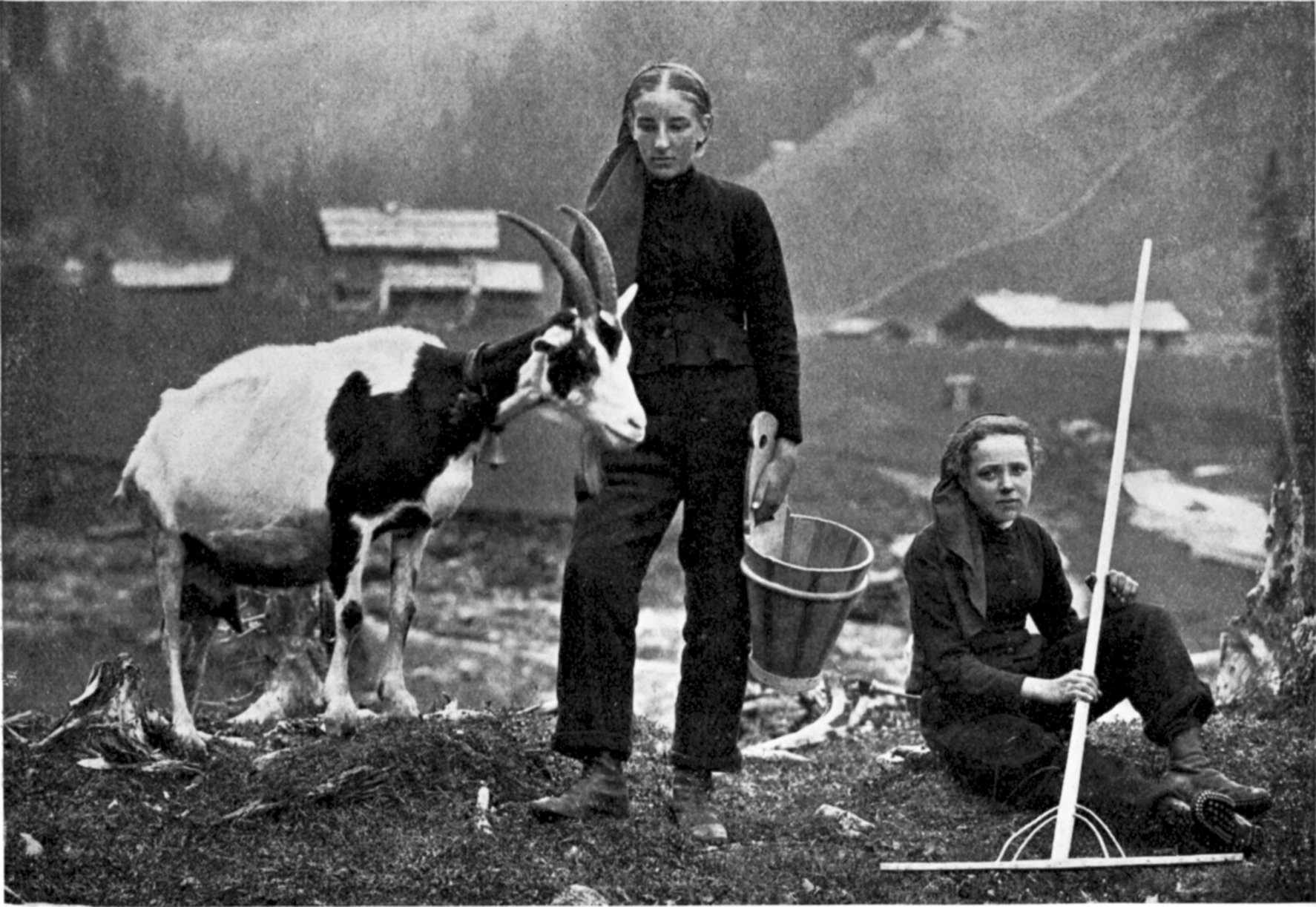
- Women of Champéry, 1912

General statistics
- Maternal mortality (per 100,000): 8 (2010)
- Women in parliament: 27.2% (2013)
- Women over 25 with secondary education: 95.0% (2012)
- Women in labour force: 76% (employment rate OECD definition, 2015)

Gender Inequality Index
- Value: 0.018 (2021)
- Rank: 3rd out of 191

Global Gender Gap Index
- Value: 0.795 (2022)
- Rank: 13th out of 146

Women in Switzerland are women who live in and are from Switzerland. The legal and social role of Swiss women has evolved significantly from the mid-20th century onwards, having been introduced at a much later rate than that of the wider West. The culture of Switzerland lies at the crossroads of several major European cultures, and therefore has certain commonalities with German culture, French culture and Italian culture.

== Patriarchal views ==
Tradition dictates that the place of Swiss women is in the home in charge of housework and child care. Being in a society with strong patriarchal roots, Swiss tradition also places women under the authority of their fathers and their husbands. Such adherence to patriarchal changed when the women of Switzerland gained their right to vote at the federal level on February 7, 1971. However, despite gaining the status of having equal rights with men, some Swiss women still have to be able to attain education beyond the post-secondary level, thus they earn less money than men, and they occupy lower-level job positions. According to swissinfo.ch in 2011, Switzerland's State Secretariat for Economic Affairs (Seco) were encouraging business companies to "appoint more women to top-level positions". Those who are already working in business companies, according to the same report, mentions that "women earn on average 20% less than men" in Switzerland, and the ratio was 6 out of 10 women were working part-time.

Prominent Swiss women in the fields of business and law include Emilie Kempin-Spyri (1853–1901), the first woman to graduate with a law degree and to be accepted as an academic lecturer in the country, and Isabelle Welton, the head of IBM Switzerland and one of few women in the country to hold a top-level position in a business firm.

== Suffrage ==
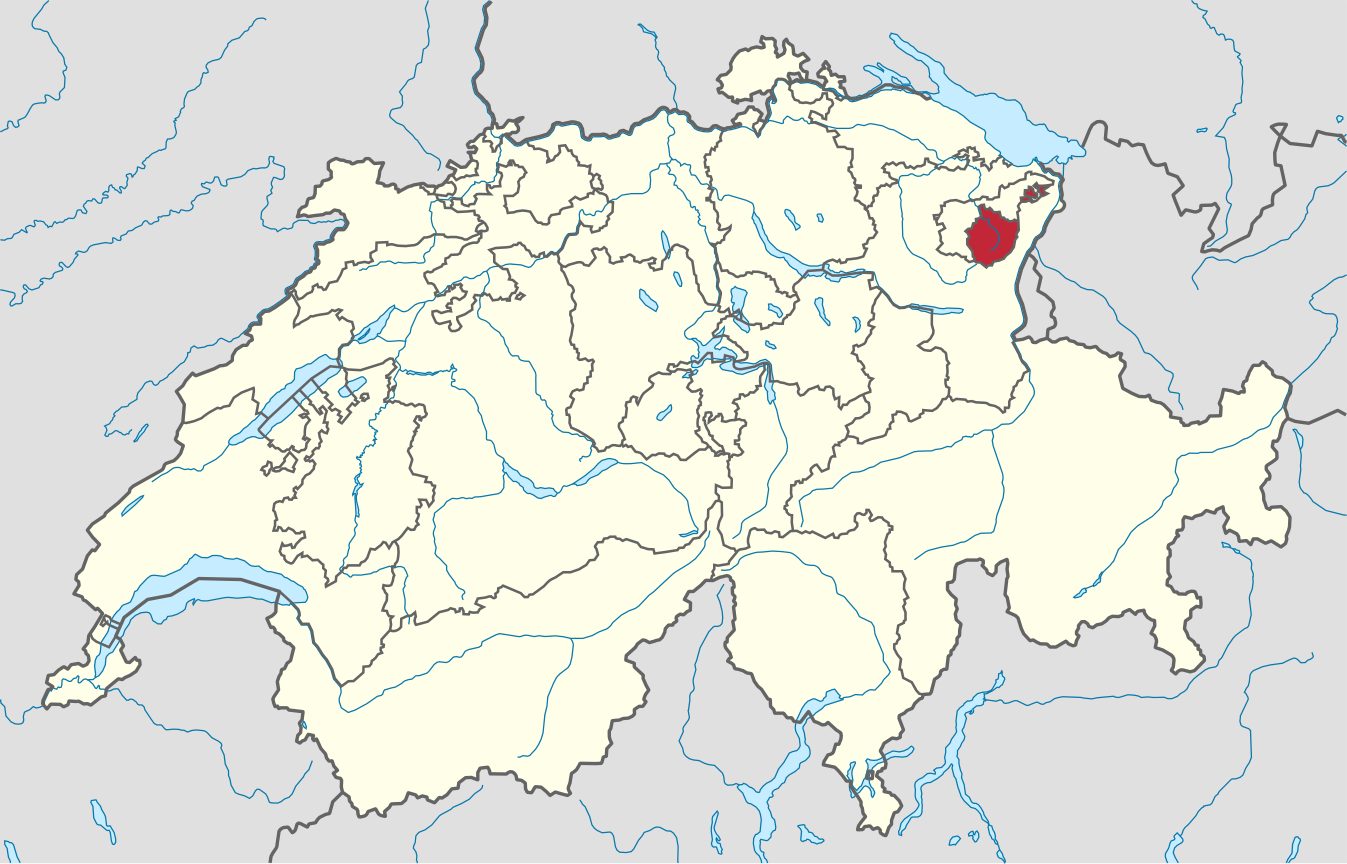
The canton of Appenzell Innerrhoden was the last jurisdiction in Europe to grant women's suffrage.

Women obtained the right to vote in national elections in 1971. Women obtained the right to vote at local canton level between 1959 (the cantons of Vaud and Neuchâtel in that year) and 1991 (the canton of Appenzell Innerrhoden).

== Marriage and family life ==
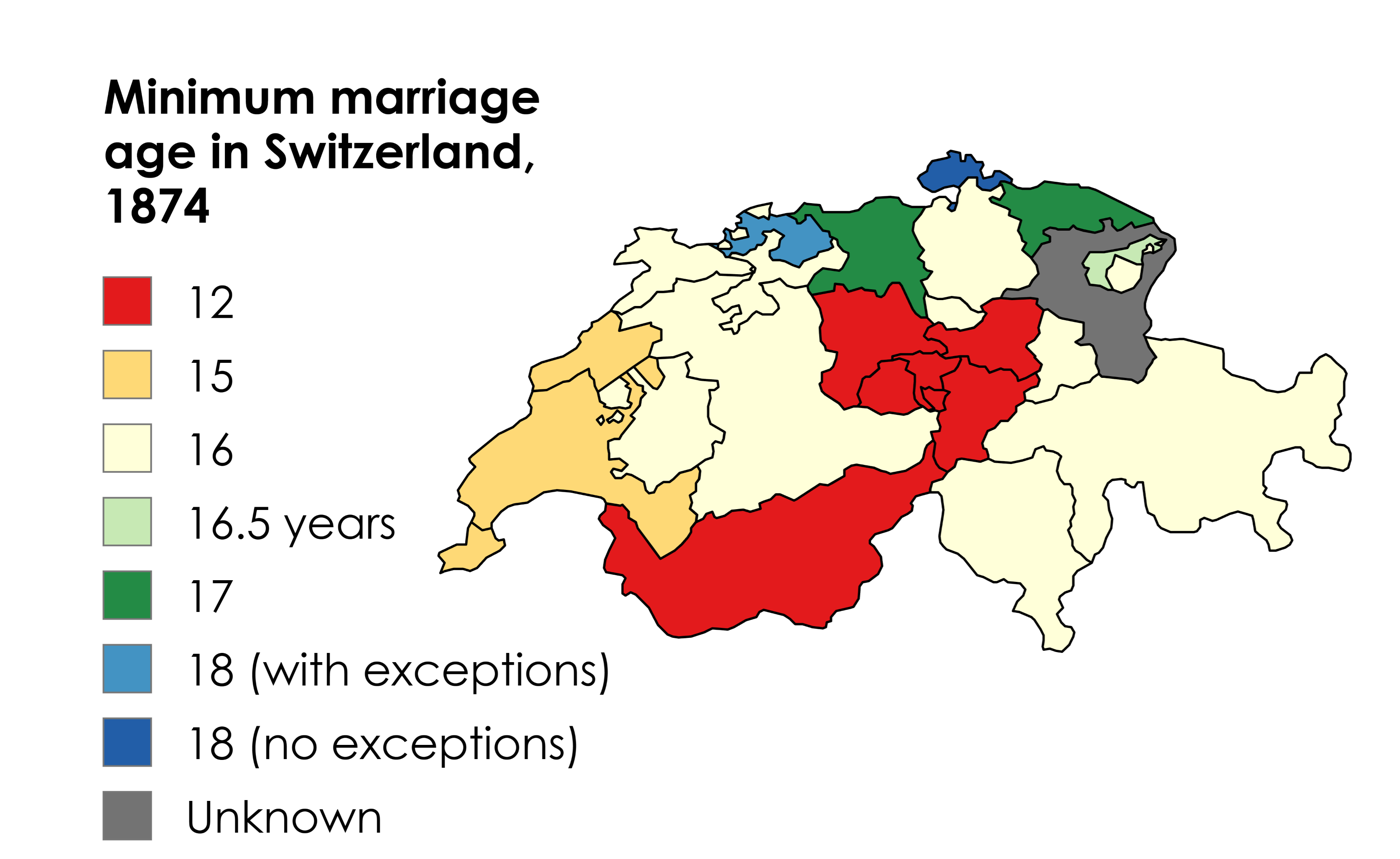
Map of female marriageable age in Switzerland in 1874

Family life has been traditionally patriarchal, following the model of a male breadwinner and a female housewife. In Europe, Switzerland was one of the last countries to establish gender equality in marriage: married women's rights were severely restricted until 1988, when legal reforms providing gender equality in marriage, abolishing the legal authority of the husband, came into force (these reforms had been approved in 1985 by voters in a referendum, who voted in favor with 54.7% of voters approving). Adultery was decriminalized in 1989. In 1992, the law was changed to end discrimination against married women with regard to national citizenship. Marital rape was criminalized in 1992, and in 2004 it became a state offense in Switzerland. Divorce laws were also reformed in 2000 and 2005. In 2013, further reforms to the civil code followed, removing the remaining discriminatory provisions regarding the spouses' choice of family name and cantonal citizenship law.

Until the late 20th century, most cantons had regulations banning unmarried cohabitation of couples. The last canton to end such prohibition was Valais, in 1995. As of 2015, 22.5% of births were to unmarried women.

== Employment ==
Women face significant struggles with regards to work for pay. Although most women are employed, many are so on a part-time basis or in marginal employment. The view that women, especially married women, should not work full-time remains prevalent. Among the OECD, only the Netherlands has more women working part-time. Although the law no longer requires the husband's consent for a wife's work, in job interviews women are often asked for it. Taxation penalizing dual-income families exists in some cantons. The OECD has stated that "The lack of family-friendly policy and workplace support makes it very difficult for many Swiss parents, usually mothers, to combine work and family life". The OECD has also urged Switzerland to end the practice of irregular and interrupted school hours which makes it difficult for mothers to work; and to revise its tax and supplementary benefits policies. Despite all these, women have a legal right to work and to not be discriminated in the workforce, under the 1996 equality law. In 2005, paid maternity leave was introduced in Switzerland, after voters approved it in a referendum. Four previous attempts to secure it had previously failed at the ballot box.

== Violence against women ==
As in other Western countries, the 1990s and the 21st century saw reforms with regard to laws on domestic violence. Marital rape was made illegal in 1992, and since 2004 marital rape is prosecutable ex-officio (meaning it can be prosecuted even if the victim does not file an official complaint). Switzerland also ratified the Council of Europe Convention on Action against Trafficking in Human Beings in 2012, and the Istanbul Convention in 2017.

According to the 2023 UNODC Global Study on Homicide, in 2021, Switzerland was one of only seven countries in the world where women were more likely to be homicide victims than men (at a global level only 19% of homicide victims were women).

== Fertility and reproductive rights ==
The maternal mortality rate in Switzerland is 5.00 deaths/100,000 live births (as of 2015). Abortion laws were liberalized in 2002. Abortion is legal during the first trimester, upon condition of counseling, for women who state that they are in distress; and at later stages for medical reasons. The total fertility rate is 1.56 children born/per woman (est. of 2018) which is below the replacement rate of 2.1.

== Politics ==
In 2010, The New York Times reported that women became the majority within the Swiss government, with women holding 4 out of the Federal Council's 7 ministerial positions.

Below is a list of women to serve in, or as president of, the Federal Council:

- Elisabeth Kopp became the first female member of the Federal Council (1984-1989)
- Ruth Dreifuss served on the Federal Council (1993-2002); she served as the first ever President of the Swiss Confederation (1999)
- Ruth Metzler-Arnold served as a member of the Federal Council (1999-2003)
- Micheline Calmy-Rey served as a member of the Federal Council (2003-2011) and as President of the Swiss Confederation (2007, 2011)
- Eveline Widmer-Schlumpf served as a member of the Federal Council (2007-2015) and as President of the Swiss Confederation (2012)
- Doris Leuthard served as a member of the Federal Council (2006-2018) and as President of the Swiss Confederation (2010, 2017)
- Simonetta Sommaruga serves as a member of the Federal Council (2010-Present) and served as the President of the Swiss Confederation (2015, 2020)
- Viola Amherd serves as a member of the Federal Council (2019-Present)
- Karin Keller-Sutter serves as a member of the Federal Council (2019-Present)

== Non-sexist use of languages ==
The Federal Administration of Switzerland regularly uses three languages: German, French and Italian (Rhaeto-Romanic, or Romansh, is used less regularly). An article by Daniel Elmiger states that, "the new Federal Language Law (Sprachengesetz, Loi sur les langues, Legge sulle lingue, Lescha da linguas) adopted in 2007 demands that official language use [for official texts] must be adequate, clear and intelligible as well as non-sexist. Non-sexist language has been required in the German section of the Federal Chancellery for about 15 years, whereas the French and Italian sections have shown little interest in modifying their use of language, sticking to a more traditional language use in which masculine terms are used both specifically as well as generically."

== Women’s strikes ==
The 1991 Swiss women's strike for women’s rights was organised 10 years after the acceptance by the Swiss population of the constitutional article on the equality between women and men on June 14, 1981. The 2019 Swiss women's strike for women’s rights was held the same day of the year as the 1991 strike.

== Historical gender roles ==
The social and legal roles assigned to women in Switzerland have varied considerably across periods, and the modern division between male breadwinner and female homemaker is itself a product of nineteenth-century bourgeois society rather than a timeless norm.

=== Middle Ages ===
In the early Middle Ages, the nuclear family, embedded in the wider kinship of the clan, was a patrimonial unit under the legal authority (mundium) of the husband and father. In the most common form of marriage, the wife passed from her father's guardianship to that of her husband, although the Church required mutual consent. A wife did not inherit from her husband but received land and other assets as dowry on marrying. Under Alemannic law, property was held either separately or in common depending on its origin: an inheritance received by the wife remained part of her personal estate. Women did not leave their families on marrying but remained heirs of their parents, although sons had precedence over daughters.

Marriage was practiced not only by the landowning upper classes but also among serfs, including those bound to different lords. In the relatively frequent unions between people of different status (free and unfree), the children inherited the unfree status, which kept the seigneurial familia intact and preserved the lord's labor force.

Entry into a convent was an alternative to marriage. As nuns, women could obtain education and assume leadership roles while approaching the Christian ideal of virginity. The convent offered a secure existence and a life befitting one's station to people of both sexes. Since women had no access to the priesthood, nuns were placed under a male spiritual director. Communities of women belonging to no order, such as the Beguines, laid themselves open to suspicion and persecution.

For the nobility, marriage was an instrument: skilful marriage and inheritance policy offered a way of extending power and territory through the female line. The principal occupation of noblemen was the exercise of the rights attached to their rank, punctuated by attendance at court days, games, festivals, tournaments, hunts, and military expeditions. The noble lady was the worthy representative of her order and family; dynastic motives or the absence of a husband could lead her to exercise seigneurial power.

In rural society, the late medieval village ordinances (Offnungen) give an idea of the division of tasks. Men generally took on heavy, dangerous, or distant work (forestry, ploughing, sowing, threshing, carting, the care of large livestock), while women worked in and around the farm: cooking, fetching water, food storage, hygiene and the care of the sick, clothing and laundry, the kitchen garden, small livestock, and field work alongside the men at haymaking and harvest. Among the subordinate communal officials elected by the late medieval village were the midwives, chosen by the community of women.

In the late medieval city, town laws and guild ordinances clearly distinguished between married women, single women, and widows. Married women, under male guardianship, needed their husband's approval to engage in economic activity, even when they had their own property. Guardianship gradually lost importance for widows and single women, who generally disposed of their property freely. Under guild rules, a widow could continue to run her late husband's workshop until a son took it over or she remarried. Women engaged in paid work were found chiefly in the clothing trades (furriers, weavers, seamstresses); Zurich had a women's guild of silk weavers after 1336.

=== Early modern period ===
In the early modern period, a person's standing in the social hierarchy was determined primarily by legal status, usually inherited at birth; sex was a secondary distinction, and an individual's room for action depended more on family origin than on gender.

On the eve of the Reformation, complaints multiplied about clandestine marriages, extra-marital relationships, and broken betrothals. The morality preached by the reformers sought to establish marriage as the only legitimate setting for sexual relations, and the authorities of the Protestant cantons enforced this ideal through consistories and morals mandates in the towns and through various bodies in the countryside, replacing the former episcopal jurisdiction. The new marital ideal assigned hierarchically ordered spheres of activity to husband and wife while emphasizing that both were responsible for the success of the relationship.

In the sixteenth and seventeenth centuries, a body of moral and didactic Hausvater literature had a normative effect on the division of roles, setting out how the whole household—father, mother, children, and servants—was to function as a hierarchical community. In the ruling class, access to political office was reserved for men. From the seventeenth century in particular, the urban elites developed into a moneyed aristocracy who displayed their wealth through silk clothing, refined bodies, and wigs. Women of this milieu took part in political life under certain conditions, especially as abbesses or sovereigns, and were legally independent: they could make wills and seal documents.

The proto-industrialization of the eighteenth century brought an expansion of home work organized by urban merchant-entrepreneurs (the Verlagssystem). Men were mostly occupied with weaving, while spinning was the affair of women and children.

=== Bourgeois gender order in the Enlightenment and the early federal state ===
During the Enlightenment and the liberal era, bourgeois women took part in the (briefly mixed) sociability of the salons, but were soon confined to a narrow role grounded in the postulate of a feminine "nature" and sharply distinguished from that of men. The new conception of citizen and human being rested on the exclusion of women, legitimized—and this was new—by biological categories, and supported by a body of scientific work in newly emerging disciplines such as biology, medicine, and anthropology. Industrialization brought a normative separation between workplace and home: men were directed toward paid work outside the household, while women were progressively pushed out of economic production and political influence.

The foundation of the federal state confirmed this gender order in constitutional law. The Federal Constitution of 1848 proclaimed the legal equality of male citizens, instituted compulsory military service, and granted the same civic rights to all Swiss men of Christian (and from 1867 also Jewish) confession, but left the other sex out entirely. Where the Ancien Régime had excluded on the basis of social status, the new order discriminated against women in civic terms. The view of the federal state as a male affair was reinforced through patriotic mass events, associations, shooting and singing festivals, and military service, becoming a constitutive element of national identity by the end of the nineteenth century.

The ideal of the Swiss housewife developed alongside that of the male citizen. The bourgeois wife and mother was responsible within the family for housework, the upbringing of children, and the care of the elderly and the sick, freeing her husband for activities outside the home. By around 1900, this division of tasks was endorsed by men of every social class, party, and profession. Among the working class and in the rural and small-trades milieu, however, low wages meant that both sexes continued to contribute to the family income through subsistence and wage work; paid work by women became a marker that excluded the lower classes from economic and political power. The codification of the gender order in family law took a similar form in all the cantons and was incorporated in the Swiss Civil Code of 1907, which entered into force in 1912.

=== Change and continuity since the twentieth century ===
Switzerland introduced universal male suffrage early in international comparison but female suffrage late. The extensive direct-democratic rights of Swiss men—initiative and referendum—meant that the male electorate could refuse women the vote at the ballot box; it was argued that since at least one man could vote in every family, women contributed indirectly to political life through their husband or father.

Women's suffrage was introduced at the federal level in 1971, in a period of social upheaval following 1968 in which gender roles were questioned and loosened. The male revolt against imposed schemas, expressed by long hair in the 1970s, was the source of considerable controversy; some men also contested compulsory military service (conscientious objection) and the orientation toward so-called masculine careers. Women began to wear trousers and other clothes with masculine connotations and to smoke in public. The younger generation rebelled against a conception of sexuality limited to marriage and experimented with new forms of cohabitation. The women's liberation movement of the 1970s criticized the predominance of the housewife and mother roles and the lack of regard for women's unpaid work. The new matrimonial law that came into force in 1988 replaced male predominance within the couple with a partnership model, removing the legal force of normative role assignments.

During the twentieth century, the national origin of women increasingly determined social stratification, reflected in women's work. Women working in domestic-sector services—first from Germany and Austria, then from the 1960s from Italy, Spain, and Portugal, and from the 1980s from the former Yugoslavia, Turkey, and other countries of the Global South—made up a significant share of immigration to Switzerland. These migrant wage-earners were subject to the same norms as the proletarian domestic servants before them, the status of housewife and mother being incompatible with factory or care work. During the post-war boom from 1945 to 1980, the economy became increasingly willing to pay men a "breadwinner wage" sufficient for the wife to devote herself entirely to the household; the school system, social insurance, divorce law, and the migration regime were aligned on this dualist model.

Despite the loosening of gender norms, sexual segregation on the labor market changed little and male participation in housework rose only modestly. At the beginning of the twenty-first century, the share of fathers in paid work remained high and their employment rate was higher than that of single men, even though the time spent on household tasks had more than doubled in households with children. Poverty linked to the absence of social-insurance contributions affected older women in particular, while migrant women were especially exposed to violence and exploitation.

== See also ==
- Women's suffrage in Switzerland
- Women in Europe
