= Derrick LeVake =

American football player (born 1972)

Profile
- Position: Tackle

Personal information
- Born: May 31, 1972 (age 54)
- Listed height: 6 ft 5 in (1.96 m)
- Listed weight: 305 lb (138 kg)

Career information
- High school: West Allis Central (West Allis, Wisconsin)
- College: Wisconsin–Whitewater
- NFL draft: 1998: undrafted

Career history
- Cincinnati Bengals (1998)*; Miami Dolphins (1999)*; Amsterdam Admirals (1999–2000)
- * Offseason or practice squad member only

Derrick LeVake (born May 31, 1972) is an American former football tackle who played for the Amsterdam Admirals of the NFL Europe. He played college football at the University of Wisconsin–Whitewater.
