= West Allis Central High School =

Public high school in Wisconsin, United States

Central High School

Location
- 8516 W Lincoln Ave; West Allis, Wisconsin 53227; United States; 43.00343°N 88.01921°W

Information
- Former name: West Allis High School (1920-1941)
- Type: Public high school
- Established: 1920
- School district: West Allis – West Milwaukee School District
- Principal: Brian Summerfield
- Teaching staff: 68.39 (FTE)
- Grades: 9-12
- Enrollment: 1,032 (2023-2024)
- Student to teacher ratio: 15.09
- Colors: Maroon and gold
- Fight song: Fighting Bulldogs
- Athletics conference: Woodland Conference
- Mascot: Bulldog
- Rival: West Allis Nathan Hale
- Yearbook: WAMAGO
- Website: central.wawmsd.org

West Allis Central High School is a public high school in West Allis, Wisconsin, United States. The school boundaries are the city of West Allis, village of West Milwaukee and portions of New Berlin and Greenfield. Central's cross-town rival is Nathan Hale High School.

== History ==
Built and opened in 1920 as West Allis High School, the school's name was changed to West Allis Central in 1941. The original building was closed in 1973, when the school moved to its present location on West Lincoln Ave.

== Programs ==
Central offers few academic programs. Programs like Project Lead The Way were cut, due to budget restraints and low student attendance in those classes. The 2022-2023 school year will be the last that the school offers AVID. Central still offers auto and woodworking programs along with other trade classes.

== Athletics ==
West Allis Central Bulldogs
- School: West Allis Central High School
- Nickname: Bulldogs
- Division: Woodland West
- Conference: Woodland
- Location: West Allis, Wisconsin
- Varsity teams: 25 varsity teams
- Football stadium: West Stadium, West Allis Athletic Complex
- Basketball arena: E.H. Stech Field House
- Baseball stadium: Tex Belich Field
- Softball stadium: Thomson Field
- Soccer stadium: East Stadium, West Allis Athletic Complex
- Aquatics center: Located within the school
- Colors: Maroon And Gold
- Mascot: Bulldog
- Website: bulldogon.com

Girls' athletics are softball, basketball, bowling, cross country, soccer, pom pons, swimming and diving, tennis, track and field, strength and conditioning, wrestling and volleyball.

Boys' athletics are basketball, bowling, cross country, soccer, swimming and diving, tennis, track and field, strength and conditioning, volleyball, baseball, football, golf, and wrestling. West Allis Central (then West Allis) won the state championship in boys' cross country in 1934. West Allis Central won the state championship in 1958.

=== Conference affiliation history ===
- Suburban Conference (1925-1985)
- Suburban Park Conference (1985-1993)
- Southeast Conference (1993-1997)
- Greater Metro Conference (1997-2017)
- Woodland Conference (2017–present)

== Student organizations ==
Student organizations include Book Club, Bulldog Buddies, Chess Club, Conservation Club, Foreign Language Club, Forensics, French Honor Society, Gay-Straight Alliance, German Honor Society, Helping Hands, HOSA, Math Team, Metric Club, Musical/Play, National Honor Society, Orchestra, SADD, Skills USA, Spanish Honor Society, Black Student Union, Student Council, and WAC Yearbook.

== Notable alumni ==
- Gary J. Barczak, politician
- Allen Busby, educator and politician (graduate who later taught at WACHS)
- Jerry Golsteyn, former NFL quarterback from 1977 to 1984
- Robert T. Huber, 65th and 67th Speaker of the Wisconsin State Assembly
- Jeff Jagodzinski, former football head coach at Boston College; former head coach of the Omaha Nighthawks
- Angela Jackson, former NCAA and WNBA Basketball Center
- Dan Jansen, Olympic speed skater
- Mehryn Kraker, 2017 draft pick for Washington Mystics, current women's basketball assistant coach at UW-Green Bay
- Rocky Krsnich, Major League Baseball player 1949-1953
- Derrick LeVake, former NFL Europe player
- James Melka, former NFL linebacker in 1987
- Chellsie Memmel, Olympic and former World Champion gymnast
- Bill Miklich, former NFL player from 1947 to 1948
- Chris Witty, Olympic speed skater
