= T-Vice =

Haitian compas band

- Origin: Port-au-Prince, Haiti
- Genre: Compas
- Years active: 1992–present
- Members: Roberto Martino, Reynaldo Martino

T-Vice is a Haitian compas band currently based in Miami, Florida. The group has performed throughout the world, most notably in cities of Miami, New York City, Chicago, Toronto, Paris and throughout the Caribbean through various concerts, carnivals, and festivals.

== History ==
Roberto and Reynaldo Martino, the sons of renowned Haitian lead guitarist Robert Martino of the classic compas band, Top Vice, were musically inspired by them to create music of their own. In 1992, T-Vice was founded as a successor to Top Vice, in which the T- is shortened twice, once from Ti', then ultimately from the word petit, which is French (as well as Creole) for "small" (hence "Small" Vice). They would eventually recruit their longtime friends, James Cardozo and Gérald Kébreau completing the popular quartet, which was best known as such during the 2000s.

T-Vice band is based in Miami, FL. It was formed in 1992. Musical influences include reggae, merengue, flamenco and rock n’ roll. Unlike most Haitian bands, T-Vice's reach extends outside of Haiti to as far as the US, the Caribbean and even Europe. T-Vice collaborates with other popular Haitian bands, most notably, their former rival Michel Martelly (Sweet Micky), Michael Benjamin (Mikaben), Carimi and even their rival band Djakout Mizik. They have also worked with the famous Haitian rapper Wyclef Jean and Jamaican musician Buju Banton.

== Members ==
Musicians

- Roberto Martino – lead singer, guitarist, composer and co-center (1992–present)
- Reynaldo Martino – band's maestro, keyboardist, composer and co-center (1992–present)
- James Cardozo – backing vocal, occasional rap and keytar (1997–Present )
- Gérald Kébreau – bass guitar (1999–2014)
- Olivier Duret – second lead singer (2005–2013)
- Eddy Junior Viau (Ti Eddy) – percussionist (2006–2014; 2016–present)
- Rivenson Louissaint - drummer (2005–2014)
- Wesner Charles (Ti Wesner) (2008–2009)
- Ricot Amazan (Ti Tambou) – drummer (2009–2015)
- Marvens Bastien - drummer (2014–2021)
- Antoine Felder - guitar (2014–2020)
- Leovins Mathurin – drummer (2021–present)
- Cyril Virginius - guitarist, keytarist (2023–present)

Manager(s):

- Jessie Al-Khal – manager (1992–)
