= Hirtellina fruticosa =

Scientific classification
- Kingdom: Plantae
- Clade: Tracheophytes
- Clade: Angiosperms
- Clade: Eudicots
- Clade: Asterids
- Order: Asterales
- Family: Asteraceae
- Genus: Hirtellina
- Species: H. fruticosa

Binomial name
- Hirtellina fruticosa (L.) Dittrich

Species of flowering plant

Hirtellina fruticosa is a species of flowering plant in the family Asteraceae. It belongs to the genus Hirtellina and is native to the Aegean Islands of Greece, including Crete.

== Taxonomy ==
Hirtellina fruticosa was first described by the botanist Alexandre Henri Gabriel de Cassini in 1827.

== Distribution and habitat ==
The accepted species, Hirtellina fruticosa, is native to the Aegean Islands of Greece, including Crete. It grows primarily in subtropical environments.
