= Hirtellina kurdica =

Scientific classification
- Kingdom: Plantae
- Clade: Tracheophytes
- Clade: Angiosperms
- Clade: Eudicots
- Clade: Asterids
- Order: Asterales
- Family: Asteraceae
- Genus: Hirtellina
- Species: H. kurdica

Binomial name
- Hirtellina kurdica (Merxm. & Rech.f.) Dittrich

Species of plant

Hirtellina kurdica is a species of flowering plant in the family Asteraceae. It belongs to the genus Hirtellina and is native to the Kurdistan Region of Turkey, Iran and Iraq. The species grows on rocky slopes and dry limestone habitats, generally at elevations between 850 and 1,350 metres.

== Taxonomy ==
The species was originally described as Staehelina kurdica by Merxmüller and Rechinger in 1959. It was subsequently transferred to the genus Hirtellina by Dittrich in 1996, giving it the currently used scientific name Hirtellina kurdica (Merxm. & Rech.f.) Dittrich.

The genus Hirtellina belongs to the tribe Cardueae within the family Asteraceae. The genus includes several species distributed mainly in the eastern Mediterranean region and western Asia.

== Description ==
Hirtellina kurdica is a subshrub with numerous stems, which may be finely papillose-scabrous or glabrous. Its flowering stems are approximately 25–70 cm tall and densely covered with leaves. The leaves are linear-lanceolate to ovate-lanceolate, measuring approximately 20–45 mm long and 8–21 mm wide.

== Distribution and habitat ==
The species was originally described from northern Iraq, in the historical Kurdistan region around Mosul. Its distribution was subsequently documented in southeastern Turkey, particularly in Şırnak and Siirt provinces.

In Turkey, specimens have been recorded from the Cudi Mountains, the Gabar Mountains and the area between Siirt and Eruh. The plants were collected from rocky slopes, rock crevices and dry limestone scrub habitats at elevations of approximately 850–1,350 m.

The species occurs in association with other plants characteristic of the Irano-Turanian region, including Satureja avromanica, Cyclotrichium stamineum and Origanum vulgare subsp. gracile.

== Phenology ==
Hirtellina kurdica flowers from October to November. Botanical specimens collected in southeastern Turkey during October 2013 and October 2014 contributed to the documentation of its distribution in the country.

== Discovery and research ==
Although the species was originally described from Iraq, it was not included in earlier accounts of the Turkish flora.

In 2013 and 2014, botanist Mehmet Fırat collected specimens from Şırnak and Siirt provinces during floristic investigations in southeastern Turkey. These collections established the presence of the species in Turkey.

In 2019, Fırat published a detailed taxonomic study in the Iranian Journal of Botany. The study provided a morphological description, photographs, a geographical distribution map and investigations of pollen and achene morphology. It formally documented Hirtellina kurdica as a new record for the flora of Turkey.

== Local name ==
In Şırnak province, the plant is locally known as Tehnovik.
