= Sagrada Familia (disambiguation) =

Sagrada Família is an unfinished basilica in Barcelona, Catalonia, Spain.

Sagrada Familia may also refer to:

- Holy Family

== Places ==
- Sagrada Familia, Chile, a town
- Sagrada Família (Barcelona Metro), a station on the Barcelona Metro serving the basilica
- Sagrada Família (neighborhood), a neighborhood of Barcelona, named after the basilica

== Other ==
- Templo de la Sagrada Familia, Cusco, a colonial Renaissance church in Cusco, Cusco Region, Peru
- Sagrada Família (East Timor), an East Timorese organisation
- La Sagrada Familia (song), a song by the Alan Parsons Project from the 1987 album Gaudi
- Alexandre da Sagrada Família (1737–1818), formerly Alexandre José da Silva, 25th Bishop of Angra

== See also ==
- Holy Family (disambiguation)
- La Familia (disambiguation)
