= West Allis – West Milwaukee School District =

School district in Wisconsin, United States

The School District of West Allis-West Milwaukee

Location
- West Allis, Wisconsin United States

District information
- Type: Public
- Motto: The West Way, Learning That Works
- Grades: Pre-K-12
- Superintendent: Tarrynce Robinson

Students and staff
- Students: 7,095
- Athletic conference: Greater Metro Conference (Hale); Woodland Conference (Central)

Other information
- Website: https://www.wawmsd.org/

The School District of West Allis-West Milwaukee is a school district mostly in Milwaukee County, Wisconsin. The district has two comprehensive high schools (grades 9–12), one alternative high school (grades 9–12), one charter high school (grades 9–12), two intermediate schools (grades 6–8) and nine elementary schools (grades 4K-5). The superintendent is Dr. Tarrynce Robinson. The West Allis-West Milwaukee Board of Education is composed of nine members.

The district is mostly in Milwaukee County, where it includes the City of West Allis, the Village of West Milwaukee, and a small portion of Greenfield. It includes a small portion of New Berlin, Waukesha County.

== Board of education ==
The school board has nine members who serve three year terms. The school board has regular school board meetings, usually on the second and fourth Monday of the month, at the district's Administration Building.

== Schools ==
=== High schools ===
- West Allis Central High School
- Nathan Hale High School
- James E. Dottke High School
- Shared Journeys Charter School

=== Intermediate schools ===
- Frank Lloyd Wright Intermediate School
- West Milwaukee Intermediate School

=== Elementary schools ===
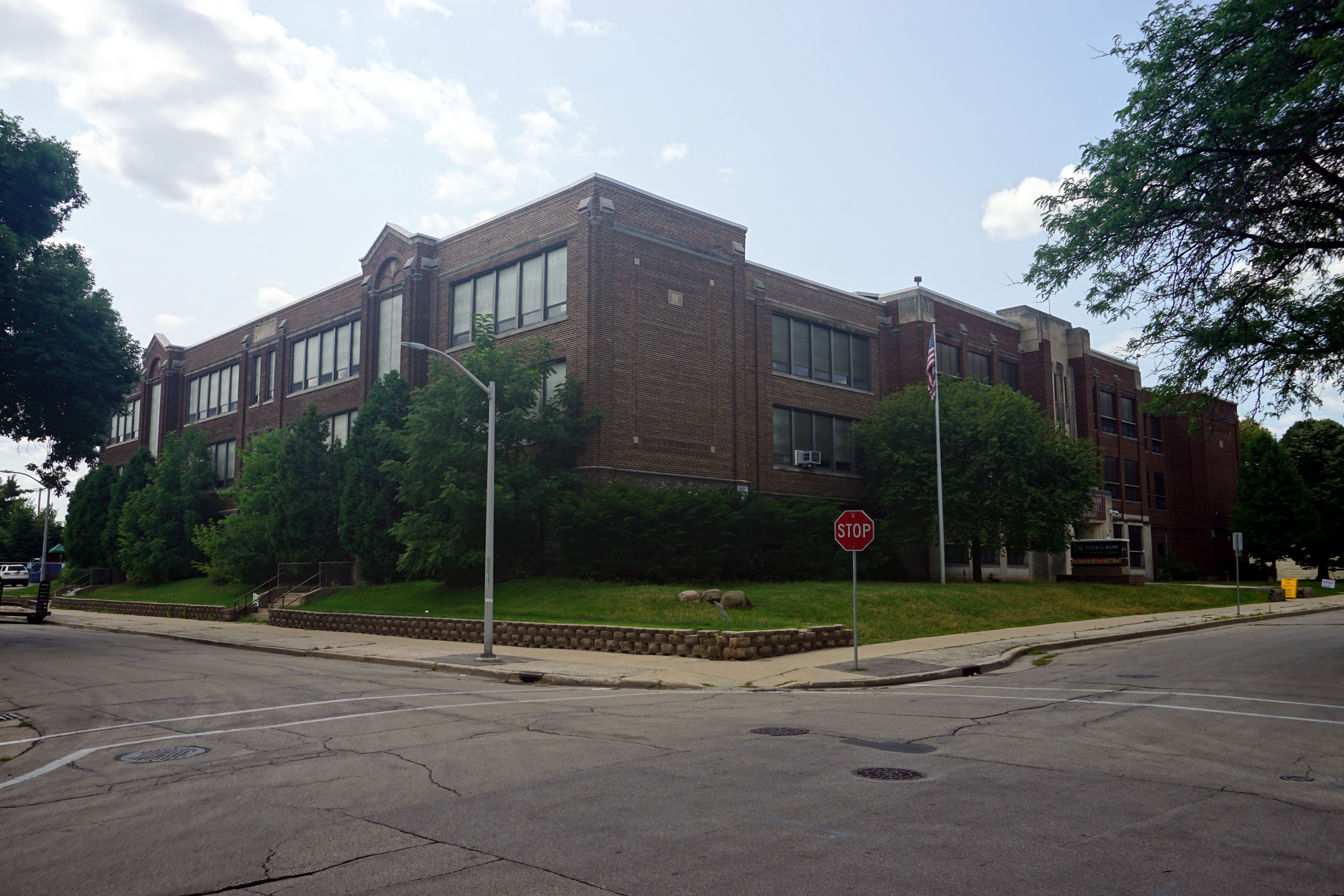
Horace Mann Elementary School in West Allis

- Franklin Elementary School
- Hoover Elementary School
- Irving Elementary School
- Jefferson Elementary School
- Horace Mann Elementary School
- General Mitchell Elementary School
- Pershing Elementary School
- Walker Elementary School
- Wilson Elementary School

The elementary schools are known in the area for providing full-day 4K, something that is not common in the greater Milwaukee area

=== 4K Centers ===
In the 2016–17 school year, all satellite 4K centers were eliminated and the programs were placed within their corresponding neighborhood school.
