= Khanh Doan =

American actress

- Born: Vietnam
- Education: Stanford University
- Occupation: Actress
- Years active: 2003-present
- Website: Official website

Khanh Doan is a stage and screen actress from Seattle, Washington.

== Early life and education ==
Doan was born in Vietnam and moved to the United States as a child. She was a dedicated student following her immigration, but also appreciated theater. She took her first acting class in ninth grade, graduated from Stanford University and began a professional acting career in Seattle in 2003.

== Career ==
=== Stage ===
Doan has performed onstage at Seattle's 5th Avenue Theatre in Miss Saigon, at Village Theater in Jesus Christ Superstar, and at the ACT Theatre in A Christmas Carol. In 2012, Doan performed the lead role of Sita in the ACT Theatre staged retelling of the sacred Hindu epic, Ramayana. Doan performs regularly at the Seattle Children's Theatre (SCT) and has appeared in: Sleeping Beauty, Harold and the Purple Crayon, Peter Pan, The Sorcerer's Apprentice, Art Dog, Everyone Knows What a Dragon Looks Like, Busytown, High School Musical, Go, Dog. Go! and Lyle the Crocodile.

=== Film and television ===
On screen, Doan has appeared with Peter Dinklage in The Knights of Badassdom, with Elliott Gould in Switchmas, with Timothy Hutton in Leverage, and with Antonio Banderas in The Big Bang. Doan has also appeared in several independent film projects including Simply Fobulous, God Machine, Family and the Seattle International Film Festival Fly Film Safe Passage. Doan has also starred as Khanh, the Red Dragon Warrior in the original web series, Chop Socky Boom.

=== Video games ===
Doan voices characters in the video games Daylight, Saw and Nancy Drew: Warnings at Waverly Academy.
