= Familial =

Familial may refer to:

- Familial (album), a 2010 studio album by Phil Selway
- Family, a group of people affiliated by consanguinity, affinity, or co-residence
- Family (taxonomy), one of the eight major taxonomic ranks, classified between order and genus
- Heredity, passing of genetic traits to offspring
  - Genetic disorder, more specifically
  - List of genetic disorders

== See also ==
- Family (disambiguation)
