= Mike Krsnich =

American baseball player (1931–2011)

- Left fielder
- Born: September 24, 1931; West Allis, Wisconsin, U.S.
- Died: April 30, 2011 (aged 79); Mesquite, Nevada, U.S.
- Batted: Right Threw: Right

Professional debut
- MLB: April 23, 1960, for the Milwaukee Braves
- NPB: July 16, 1963, for the Kintetsu Buffaloes

Last appearance
- MLB: May 19, 1962, for the Milwaukee Braves
- NPB: 1967, for the Hanshin Tigers

MLB statistics
- Batting average: .190
- Runs batted in: 2
- Games played: 15
- Stats at Baseball Reference

Teams
- Milwaukee Braves (1960, 1962); Taiyo Whales (1963–1965); Kintetsu Buffaloes (1966); Hanshin Tigers (1967)

Michael Krsnich (né Krznić; September 24, 1931 – April 30, 2011) was an American left fielder in Major League Baseball who played for the Milwaukee Braves during the 1960 and 1962 seasons. Listed at 6 ft 1 in (1.85 m), 190 lb., he batted and threw right-handed. His older brother, Rocky Krsnich, also played in the majors from 1949 to 1953.

Born in West Allis, Wisconsin, to a Montenegrin Serb father, Mike Krsnich was one of many baseball players whose career was interrupted during Korean War conflict. He was the brother of Rocky Krsnich (1927–2019) and Nick Krsnich (b. 1928).

Krsnich played briefly for the Braves in part of two seasons. He had previously signed by the Philadelphia Phillies before landing in Milwaukee, playing mostly at outfield and as pinch-hitter in just 21 games.

Following his major league stint, Krsnich joined the Taiyo Whales of the Japanese Central League from 1963 to 1965. He slugged a .500 average in his first two years in Japan, belting 36 home runs in 1964 to finish second to the legendary Sadaharu Oh, who hit 55 homers.

Krsnich opened 1966 with the Osaka Kintetsu Buffaloes and joined the Hanshin Tigers for the last half of the 1967 season. In his five years in Japan, he hit a .265 average with a .326 on-base percentage and a slugging of .475. He also played 13 Minor league seasons between 1950 and 1969, batting .288 with 127 home runs in 1237 games.

Krsnich died in Mesquite, Nevada, at the age of 79.
