= Gary J. Barczak =

Member of the Wisconsin State Assembly

Gary J. Barczak (born September 24, 1939 in West Allis, Wisconsin) was a member of the Wisconsin State Assembly. He graduated from West Allis Central High School before attending Marquette University and George Washington University. Barczak is married with one child and is a member of Kiwanis.

== Career ==
Barczak was first elected to the Assembly in 1972 in a special election. Previously, he had worked as a legislative assistant for U.S. Representative Clement J. Zablocki. He is a Democrat.
