= Familia =

Familia may refer to:

- Familia, Latin designation of the family taxonomic rank
- Familia (ancient Rome), a classical Roman household with a Pater familias
- Familia, historical designation for a medieval household
- The Spanish word for family

== People ==
- Alexandre da Sagrada Família (1737–1818), Portuguese bishop of the Azores
- Jeurys Familia (born 1989), Dominican professional baseball pitcher

== Cinema and television ==
- Familia (1996 film), a 1996 Spanish-French film
- Familia (2005 film), a 2005 Canadian film
- Familia (2023 film), a 2023 Mexican film
- Família, a 2023 Japanese film directed by Izuru Narushima
- Familia (2024 film), a 2024 Italian film by Francesco Costabile
- "Familia", an episode of the American television drama Six Feet Under
- "Familia", an episode of the Canadian television comedy series The Office Movers

== Music ==
- Família, a 2013 album by Beth
- Familia (Sophie Ellis-Bextor album), released in 2016
- Familia (Camila Cabello album), released in 2022
  - "Familia", the title track of the album
- "Família", a 1987 single by Brazilian rock band Titãs
- "Familia", a 2018 Nicki Minaj and Anuel AA song

== Organizations ==
- Familia (political party), a Polish political party
- FAMILIA (lay apostolate), a Christian organization based in Minnesota
- Familia (theatre company), a Tunisian theatre company

== Other ==
- Familia (magazine), a Romanian literary magazine published 1865–1906
- Mazda Familia, a small car manufactured by Mazda

== See also ==
- La Familia (disambiguation)
- Family (disambiguation)
