= James Melka =

American football player (born 1962)

No. 52
- Position: Linebacker

Personal information
- Born: January 15, 1962 (age 64); West Allis, Wisconsin, U.S.
- Listed height: 6 ft 1 in (1.85 m)
- Listed weight: 235 lb (107 kg)

Career information
- High school: West Allis Central
- College: Wisconsin
- NFL draft: 1985: 12th round, 330th overall pick

Career history
- Tampa Bay Buccaneers (1985)*; Buffalo Bills (1987)*; Green Bay Packers (1987)
- * Offseason or practice squad member only

Awards and highlights
- First-team All-Big Ten (1983); Second-team All-Big Ten (1984)

Career NFL statistics
- Interceptions: 1
- Stats at Pro Football Reference

James David Melka (born January 15, 1962) is an American former professional football player who was a linebacker in the National Football League (NFL). He played college football for the Wisconsin Badgers.

== Biography ==
Melka was born on January 15, 1962, in West Allis, Wisconsin. He attended West Allis Central High School where he was an All-America running back. As a senior, he rushed for over 1,600 yards. Melka is featured in his high school's Athletic Wall of Fame.

== Football career ==
Melka played linebacker at the collegiate level at the University of Wisconsin-Madison and was named to the All-Big Ten team twice. Playing under coach Dave McClain, Melka led the Badgers in tackles each of his last three seasons at Wisconsin.

Against Purdue at Ross–Ade Stadium in 1982, Melka recovered a blocked punt and returned it 32 yards for Wisconsin's game-winning touchdown with 29 seconds left. In 1983, the Badgers clinched a 35-31 win over Iowa when Melka blocked a punt and returned it for a touchdown with 32 seconds left.

In the 1984 Hall of Fame Classic against the Kentucky Wildcats, Melka recorded 14 tackles, which is tied for the second-most total tackles by a Wisconsin player in a bowl game in school history.

According to news reports, Melka "made a good showing" playing for coach Joe Restic of Harvard at the 60th annual East–West Shrine Bowl held at Stanford Stadium on January 5, 1985.

He was selected in the 12 round of the 1985 NFL draft by Tampa Bay. However, he broke his navicular bone in his wrist playing in a pickup basketball game and never appeared in a game for the Buccaneers. He was placed on waivers on August 19, 1985. He signed with the Buffalo Bills on February 21, 1986, but he broke his foot two weeks into training camp and spent the entire season on injured reserve. As a Bills player, he cast one of the preliminary votes on union matters relating to what would become the 1987 NFL Players Strike. The Bills waived him on July 30, 1987. During the strike in 1987, Melka became a member of the Green Bay Packers, coached by Forrest Gregg.

After the NFL, he became a firefighter in Waukesha, Wisconsin. Government records show that he held the job of Fire Equipment Operator from 2017 to 2020.
