= Chop Socky Boom =

Comedy web series

- Genre: Comedy
- Created by: Darlene Sellers; Heath Ward
- Starring: Khanh Doan; Andrew McMasters; Jen Page; Jay Irwin; Brandon Ryan
- Composer: Matt Sayre
- Original language: English
- No. of seasons: 1
- No. of episodes: 8

Production
- Production locations: Seattle, WA, US
- Running time: 7-10 minutes

Original release
- Release: May 1, 2012

Chop Socky Boom is a comedy web series created by Darlene Sellers and Heath Ward and filmed in Seattle, Washington. The series is broadcast on the internet and premiered on May 1, 2012. Season one includes eight episodes, with season two currently under development. Chop Socky Boom follows the adventures of misfit indie film actors cast in the fictional kung fu film, “Final Zodiac Warrior.” CSB focuses on main character Khanh and her friends, Scottie, Paige, Daisy and Max, as they audition for a poorly run chop socky series created by Trick, an Ed Wood like Director with his own unique vision.

== History ==
Chop Socky Boom was created by Sellers and Ward as a tribute to the adventures and misadventures of Seattle indie filmmaking. The first season was funded in part through a crowdfunding campaign and from a small grant awarded by 4Culture. In May, 2012 CSB premiered on YouTube and the Web Series Channel and was featured by Zombie Orpheus Entertainment (ZOE), a distribution company created by Dead Gentlemen Productions. In 2014, CSB was picked up for distribution by Frostbite Pictures and is currently available on JTS.TV.

== Plot ==
Khanh is a talented, Seattle actress working hard to find her big break. She and eleven other local actors are cast in a new action show, “Final Zodiac Warrior.” FZW is a cross between Enter the Dragon and Highlander and features twelve warriors based on the Chinese zodiac. Portraying the signs of Rat, Pig, Rabbit, Rooster and Dragon, Khanh and her friends survive the indie film making process, all the while doing battle with their own individual demons. Be it mistreatment from their fabulous and beautiful cast member counterparts, ambiguous direction from the director Trick, or even the threat of looming unemployment at the day job, the misfits boldly fight the demons.

== Production ==
Principal photography takes place in Seattle, Washington. Locations include Kubota Gardens, the Seattle Chinatown-International District, Hing Hay Park (Seattle), the University District, White Center, Washington, Jet City Improv, and Victory Studios.

== Cast ==
- Khanh Doan as Khanh, the Red Dragon
- Andrew McMasters as Trick, the Director
- Jen Page as Paige, the Pink Pig
- Jay Irwin as Scottie, the Purple Rat
- Darlene Sellers as Daisy, the Turquoise Rabbit
- Brandon Ryan as Max, the PA
- Lowell Deo as D'Angelo, the Gold Tiger
- Lisa Coronado as Eva, the Periwinkle Goat
- Dan Humphrey as Charlie, the Blue Dog
- S. Joe Downing as Dillon, the Bronze Ox
- Eric Stevens as Ty, the Orange Horse
- Terisa Greenan as Mitzi, the Casting Director
- Shawn Telford as Jerry, Khanh's Agent
- Angela DiMarco as Carmen, the Line Producer
- David S Hogan as Rory, the New Dragon
- Brittany Cox as Madison, the Maroon Monkey
- D’Angelo Midili as Jack, the Silver Snake
- Kim Watts as Athena, the Script Girl
- Cliff Lee as Bruce, the Stunt Coordinator
- Bella as Herself

== Reception ==
In 2014, the Seattle True Independent Film Festival named CSB the “Best Web Series" of the Festival. CSB has also received five Indie Fest Awards including Merit in Webseries, Directing, Writing and Editing, four Accolade Awards including Merit in Webisodes, Lead Actress and Choreography, three Best Shorts Competition Awards including Merit in Original score, Ensemble cast and Web Series, and five LA Web Fest 2013 Comedy awards including Outstanding Direction, Achievement in Sound, Outstanding Theme Song by Composer Matt Sayre, Outstanding Lead Actress Khanh Doan, and Outstanding Ensemble Cast. In 2015, CSB Production Designers Cherelle Ashby and Jonelle Cornwall were nominated for the 6th Indie Series Awards. CSB has also screened at the Raindance Film Festival as part of the London Webfest, Seattle Asian American Film Festival, Indie Film Quarterly Film Festival, the Seattle International Film Festival Catalyst Program, Emerald City Comicon, Hollyweb Festival, Vancouver Web Festival, Austin Webfest, Gen Con Indy, and KOMO-TV.
