= J. California Cooper =

American playwright and author

Joan Cooper
- Born: Joan Cooper; November 10, 1931; Berkeley, California, U.S.
- Died: September 20, 2014 (aged 82); Seattle, Washington, U.S.
- Writing career
- Genres: playwright, short stories
- Notable awards: 1989 American Book Award

Joan Cooper (November 10, 1931 – September 20, 2014), known by her pen name, J. California Cooper, was an American playwright and author. She wrote 17 plays and was named Black Playwright of the Year in 1978 for her play Strangers. Cooper also received an American Book Award in 1989, a James Baldwin Writing Award (1988), and a Literary Lion Award (1988) from the American Library Association.

== Early life ==
Joan “California” Cooper was born on November 10, 1931 in Berkeley, California to Joseph Cooper and Maxine Rosemary Lincoln Cooper. She was the youngest of five siblings, having three sisters (one deceased, Shirley May) and one brother. Her father worked as a scrap metal maker and her mother worked as a welder in World War II before owning a beauty salon later on. Though Cooper grew up in California, she also frequently spent time with her aunt in Marshall, Texas as a child, which was her father’s hometown.

Her mother, Maxine Rosemary (or “Mimi”), recalled her youngest child to be the most imaginative, always making up stories and playing with paper dolls. Maxine enjoyed her child having this vivid imagination, however, as Cooper grew older, Maxine became more strict on Cooper’s imaginative ideas, taking away her paper dolls at 18 and telling Cooper that it was time to grow up . Her mother’s action led to Cooper’s start in writing as she could no longer play out her stories out with her dolls.

Much of Cooper’s educational background is unknown. It is recorded that she graduated from a technical high school in California and temporarily attended The University of California at Berkeley before later dropping out.

== Life and career ==
=== Writing career ===
While Cooper was beginning her writing career, she worked several jobs, including being a secretary, teamster, truck-driver, manicurist, and even at one time working on the Alaskan pipelines. Cooper originally aspired to be a playwright, writing over a dozen plays by the late 1970s and coming to fame for her play Strangers, which won the 1978 Black Playwright of the Year Award. Cooper wrote a total of 17 plays throughout her career.

It was at the encouragement of Alice Walker who turned Cooper from her claim to fame in the theater to her start in writing short stories. Cooper first met Walker after her daughter, Paris, invited Walker to a performance of one of Cooper’s plays. Walker convinced Cooper to attempt at writing stories, and by 1984, Cooper had come up with a dozen short stories, including “$100 or Nothing”, “Sins Leave Scars”, “Loved to Death”, and “Color Me Real”, which was published by Alice Walker’s Wild Trees Press under the title A Piece of Mind.

After receiving some praise and success with her first series of short stories, she soon followed with a second volume, Homemade Love, in 1986, which later won her an American Book Award in 1989 and much popularity and attention. Cooper’s Homemade Love also made a TV debut as one of the short stories, “Funny Valentines,” was turned into a movie adaption in 1999 starring Alfre Woodard and Loretta Devine. Cooper went on to write five additional volumes of short stories: Some Soul to Keep (1987), The Matter is Life (1991), Some Love, Some Pain Sometime (1995), Wild Stars Seeking Midnight Suns: Stories (2006), and Catching A Falling Heart (2022).

Cooper published her first novel, Family, in 1991. Five novels followed, including In Search of Satisfaction (1994), The Wake of the Wind (1998), The Future Has a Past (2000), Some People, Some Other Place (2004), and Life is Short But Wide (2009).

=== Writing style ===
In many of her published works, Cooper stays true to the theme of writing out the lives of different poor to middle-class African-American women who must overcome individual hardships to pursue happiness. Many of her protagonists are in search of love and/or respect from their partners, and while doing so face other obstacles such as abuse, rape, resentment, childhood trauma, racism, and white supremacy. Cooper’s stories are usually told in first-person narration and are told in a gossipy style.

==== Inspiration for writing ====
Much of Cooper’s inspiration and purpose for writing comes from the Bible. As a serious Christian, many of Cooper’s lessons and morals placed in her writings came from her own religious ethics and values. It is also noted that Cooper found the most contentment writing her stories when it was raining, or when listening to classical orchestral works such as Rachmaninoff’s Third Piano Concerto.

=== Personal life ===
Much of Cooper's personal life beyond her early stages of life is unknown. Cooper was known to have kept her life very private, going under the pen name "California" Cooper (adopted from her home-state and inspired by Tennessee Williams) for a large portion of her life and revealing her given first name, Joan, in her later stages of life.

It is recorded that she was married and pregnant with her first child by age 19, and she was possibly married more than once in her lifetime. Though she was born in Berkeley, California, she spent many years of her life in Oakland, California, and Texas before moving to Seattle, Washington to live with her daughter about a year before her death in 2014.

==== Death ====
Cooper died September 20, 2014, at age 82. Her daughter, Paris Williams, reported that Cooper's cause of death was heart failure.

== Featured works ==
=== A Piece of Mine (1984) ===
Published in 1984, A Piece of Mine is Cooper’s first written work that was not a play. This short-story collection consists of twelve stories that mainly focus on the lives of women and the misogynistic hardships each individual faces, touching on subjects such as patriarchal resentment, alcoholism, and rape. Featured stories include “$100 or Nothing,” “Loved to Death,” “Sins Leave Scars”, and “Color Me Real”.

=== Homemade Love (1986) ===
Published in 1986, Homemade Love is a short-story collection containing thirteen different stories on the lives of everyday people. Several of these short-stories follow the same theme of an individual/group of individuals searching and finding happiness in the things they once had turned a blind eye to. Featured stories include “Funny Valentines,” “Without Love”, “The Magic Strength of Need,” “Living,” and “Happiness Does Not Come in Colors”.

=== Family (1991) ===
Possibly regarded as one of Cooper’s most famous works, Family is a neo-slave narrative depicting a slave family during the Civil-War era. Clora, granddaughter of a slave, commits suicide to escape slavery as her mother did. Although Clora attempted to poison her children before taking her own life, they survive and the story plays out with Clora’s spirit narrating her child’s, Always, life. Cooper displays the harsh reality of slavery through the life of Always and her fight for anticipated freedom.

=== The Wake of the Wind (1998) ===
Set on a Texas plantation in the 1860s, The Wake of the Wind tells the story of Lifee and her husband, Mordecai, who attempt to a find better life for themselves and their children in the new emancipated United States. This novel displays the cruel discrimination African-Americans faced after the Civil-War concluded, and the hardships African-Americans went through in hopes to find a life beyond slavery and the plantations.

== Bibliography ==
- 1984: A Piece of Mine
- 1986: Homemade Love, 1989 American Book Award winner
- 1987: Some Soul to Keep
- 1991: Family
- 1991: The Matter Is Life
- 1994: In Search of Satisfaction
- 1996: Some Love, Some Pain, Some Time: Stories
- 1998: The Wake of the Wind
- 2001: The Future Has a Past
- 2003: Age Ain't Nothing but a Number: Black Women Explore Midlife (contributor), edited by Carleen Brice
- 2004: Some People, Some Other Place
- 2006: Wild Stars Seeking Midnight Suns: Stories
- 2009: Life is Short but Wide
