= Terisa Greenan =

American actress and director (born 1967)

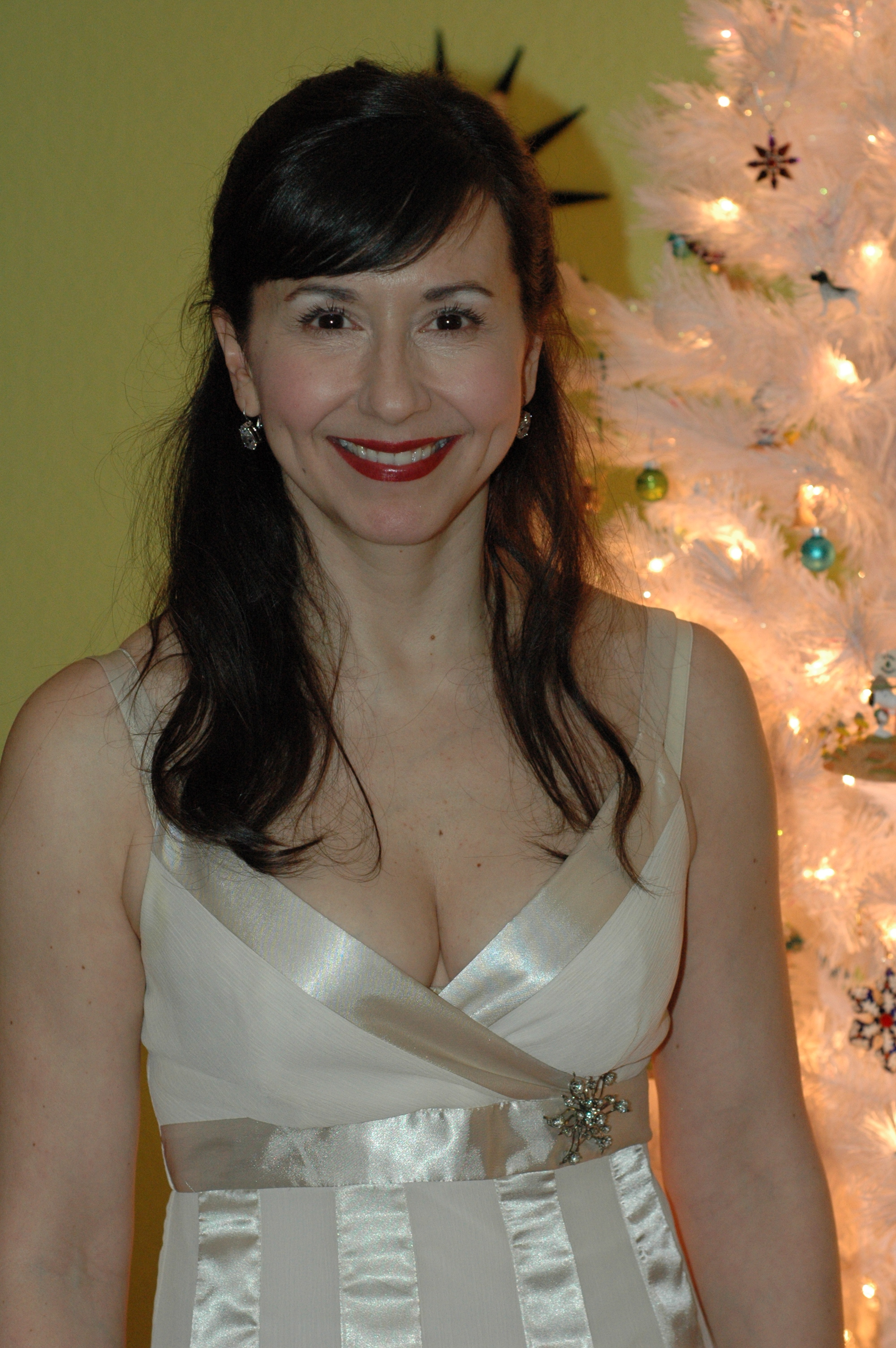
- Terisa Greenan December 2010
- Born: November 15, 1967 (age 58); Sacramento, California, USA
- Other names: Daisy; Eliza
- Education: Whitney High School; University of California, Davis
- Occupations: Film producer; Film director; Screenwriter; Stage actress; Film actress; Television actress
- Years active: 1990s-present
- Known for: Polyamory advocacy
- Notable work: Family: the web series; Chop Socky Boom
- Spouse: Markus Dinkell (m. 1991; div. 1997)
- Partners: Scott; Larry

Terisa Greenan (born November 15, 1967) is an American film producer, film director, writer and stage and film actress.

== Background ==
Raised in the suburbs of Los Angeles, Greenan attended Whitney High School (Cerritos, California) from 6th through 12th grade and then went on to graduate from University of California, Davis. Currently based in Seattle, Greenan operates her film production companies, Petal Films and 3 Dog Pictures. Greenan has received national and international attention for her semi-autobiographical web series, Family: the web series. In addition, Greenan has produced several music videos for Seattle band Gaia Consort, and wrote an article on the band for New Witch magazine. The Newsweek article which profiled Greenan, her web series and her real life family, was named one of Newsweek's Editor's Top Ten articles of 2009. Greenan's work often portrays a controversial subject in an unexpectedly nonchalant manner. As an actress, Greenan has worked in films alongside notable actors such as Cary Elwes, Dave Coulier and Tang Wei. Greenan openly advocates polyamory and lives a polyamorous life with partners Scott and Larry. The group has lived together since 2000.

== Filmography ==
=== Actress (plus) ===
- Sleep Come Free Me (1998) as Sally
- The Observation Room (2005)
- The Family Holiday (2008) as Isadora Brown
- Miss Shellagh's Miniskirt (2008) as Margaret Czarnecki (and as director, editor)
- The Day My Parents Became Cool (2009) as Mom
- Family (2008-2009) as Eliza (and as writer, producer, director, editor)
- The Classified (2009) as Kim
- Late Autumn (2010) as Prison guard
- A Face for All Occasions (2010) as Voice
- Chop Socky Boom (2 episodes, 2012) as Mitzi
- Someday You (2012) (as producer, director)
- The Rite of Sol, a Rock Opera (2013 (as editor, cinematographer)
- A Bit of Bad Luck (2014) as Country store clerk

== Advocacy ==
Terisa Greenan is an outspoken advocate for sexual freedom and has spoken on the topic of polyamory in various public forums, including multiple appearances on CNN and The BJ Shea Morning Experience, at the Institute for Advanced Study of Human Sexuality and in Canada with John Ince (politician) and Janet Hardy on a panel coinciding with a landmark Canadian court case regarding whether the anti-polygamy section of Canadian Criminal Code 293 was drawn broadly enough to impinge on the human rights of polyamorists. In 2009, Greenan co-hosted with sex therapist Dr. Roger Libby a weekly radio call-in show "Sex Once A Week" on KKNW. The radio show offered support and advice to listeners and callers with questions regarding any aspects of sex and sexuality.

"The Year The Press Came Calling, or, How My Girlfriend Mainstreamed Polyamory", ConnotationPress.com.

== Awards and nominations ==
- 2013, won shared 'Award of Recognition' from Best Shorts Competition for 'Ensemble Cast' of Chop Socky Boom
- 2015, won shared 'Outstanding Achievement Award from LA Web Fest for 'Ensemble Cast: Comedy' Chop Socky Boom
