= The Family (1971 TV series) =

- Genre: Drama
- Created by: Ed McGibbon
- Country of origin: Canada
- Original language: English
- No. of seasons: 1
- No. of episodes: 4

Production
- Producer: Jack Nixon-Brown
- Running time: 60 minutes

Original release
- Network: CBC Television
- Release: 17 February – 24 March 1971

The Family is a Canadian drama television miniseries which aired on CBC Television in 1971.

== Premise ==
This series of four dramas was about modern families.

== Scheduling ==
This hour-long series was broadcast at 9:00 p.m. from 17 February to 24 March 1971.

- 17 February 1971: "The Stranger Was Me" (by Dennis Donovan) featured the life of a boy who lives in a country foster home
- 24 February 1971: "You And Me" (by Douglas Bowie) concerned a couple whose lives are pulled in separate directions, a situation which prevents them from having a normal family life
- 10 March 1971: "Forever Amok" (by Len Peterson) was a comedy about a man whose children were born by numerous women
- 17 March 1971: "Straight And Narrow" (by George Robertson) deals with a father whose traditional values are challenged by his family
