= Hirtellina =

Scientific classification
- Kingdom: Plantae
- Clade: Tracheophytes
- Clade: Angiosperms
- Clade: Eudicots
- Clade: Asterids
- Order: Asterales
- Family: Asteraceae
- Subfamily: Carduoideae
- Tribe: Cardueae
- Genus: Hirtellina (Cass.) Cass.

Type species
- Hirtellina lanceolata Cass.

Synonyms
- Staehelina subgenus Hirtellina Cass.

Genus of flowering plants

Hirtellina is a genus of flowering plants in the thistle tribe Cardueae within the daisy family Asteraceae.

Species

- Hirtellina fruticosa (L.) Dittrich - Greek islands
- Hirtellina kurdica (Merxm. & Rech.f.) Dittrich - Iraq
- Hirtellina lanceolata Cass. - Crete
- Hirtellina lobelii (DC.) Dittrich - Cyprus, Lebanon, Syria, Turkey
