= Family (Cooper novel) =

Neo-Slave Narrative

- First edition
- Author: J. California Cooper
- Language: English
- Published: 1991
- Publisher: Doubleday
- Publication place: United States
- ISBN: 0385411723

Family, published in 1991, is a neo-slave narrative written by American playwright and author J. California Cooper. It tells the story of multiple generations of African-American slaves from the point of view of the dead Clora, who killed herself and tried to kill her four children in order to escape slavery. Clora follows her four children around the world through the years, but keeps a special eye on Always, her favorite child. The novel spans from 1840 through 1933, with Clora waking up and skipping to different time periods throughout the years.

Academic James Weaver has noted that the novel "has remained relatively understudied and undervalued for its contribution to the genre."

== Plot summary ==
=== Within Swallow-Land ===
The novel begins with the ghost of Clora describing the start of slavery and her early life. Her mother Fammy was repeatedly raped by the Master of the Land bore him nine children, all of whom were sold by the Mistress of the Land by the time they were three years old. In order to combat this, Fammy had a child with another Black slave, who she named Clora. The torture of being a slave was too much for her, however, and Flora committed a murder-suicide with the Master of the Land, leaving Clora behind in the hands of Miz Elliz, another slave. The Master's son, the Young Master of the Land, took over in his place and eventually began raping Clora before she was even twelve years old, forcing her to give birth to several children, Always, Sun, Peach, and Plum. Fearing the sale of her children and her own death by the Mistress and Master of the Land, Clora tried to feed herself and her children poison tea. Only Clora died and her ghost followed the lives of all of her children, particularly the eldest child Always.

Clora's children were constantly tormented by the Young Master's children with the Young Mistress, Loretta and Virginia. Virginia despised pretty slaves like Always and Peach because she felt that she was ugly. Loretta was sympathetic towards Sun as she could tell that they were related, giving him preferential treatment and assisting in multiple escape attempts. After a second, successful escape attempt Sun repeatedly asked Loretta to help Peach escape, only for Loretta to push her mother to sell Peach out of jealousy. The man that Peach was sold to was a nice man and eventually the two fell in love and moved to Scotland, where she changed her name to Peachel and her children grew in a wealthy household, became educated, and got high paying jobs. Sun was also able to gain happiness. When he was seventeen he was able to convince a business owner to let him work for only some food and a place to sleep. His hard work eventually convinces the business owner, Mr. DuBois, to promote Sun to work for his other businesses. Mr. DuBois's daughter also falls in love with Sun and they have children in a wealthy household.

By 1844 Always and Plum are the only two siblings remaining on the farm, which is now in very deep debt. Always is sold to a well-off landowner named Doak Butler, who purchased her as a slave for his fiancé Wanda Sue. Unable to imagine a life without her sibling, Plum manages to secretly hide herself on the bottom of the buggy but is crushed and bleeds to death by a mechanism underneath the buggy.

=== Before the Civil War ===
Once at his land, Doak rapes Always and forces her to clean up the remnants of her dead sister. She is also introduced to Poon, another slave, and Jason, Doak's brother, who was paralyzed from the waist down. Hoping to earn some money for herself, Always decides to take care of the farm but soon discovers that she's pregnant with Doak's child. She is also surprised to discover that she doesn't hate Wanda Sue, who is by now married to Doak and also pregnant with his child. Always receives kind and preferential treatment from Wanda Sue, who allows her to rebuild the chicken coop so that Always would have a private place to sleep with her future child, but asked Always to be present with her when it became time for her to give birth.

Eventually both women give birth to their respective children on the same day, both of whom are boys. Noticing that her son had Doak's blue eyes whereas Wanda Sue does not, Always switches the two children out so her son can escape becoming a slave. In order for them to have something that connects them, she burns a mole onto his and her hip. She chooses to name Wanda Sue's child "Soon" while Doak and Wanda Sue name Always's son Doak Jr. The two boys are very close, resulting in Doak Jr preventing Soon's sale even as all of Always's other children by Doak are sold before they were six years old. The proceeds from the sales are used to expand the now profitable farm and Always names the land after her missing children. Wanda Sue, on the other hand, does not become pregnant again for many years and when she does become pregnant, dies along with the second child after falling ill. After Wanda Sue's death Doak continues to sexually abuse Always but soon decides to marry the daughter of the Young Master of the Land, Loretta. Aware that Soon and Doak Jr are related to one another, Loretta makes several attempts to turn the boys against one another but is unsuccessful. It is not until the boys grow older, however, that their relationship changes and Doak Jr began to play the role of the master and started treating Soon unkindly.

When the Civil War begins Doak leaves the farm to fight for the Confederacy, where he meets his own death. This prompts Doak Jr to leave and fight in his father's place and Soon is sent with him in order to protect Doak Jr. While the two boys were gone, many slaves fled and stole from the farm. One of Always's missing children returns to the farm as a runaway slave and is hired by Loretta to serve as her carriage driver. He only stays for three months before fleeing with the carriage, which devastates Loretta, who had become pregnant with his child. Loretta asks Always for help in aborting the fetus via an abortifacient tea, only for Always to secretly feed her prenatal teas so she gives birth to a healthy child. Once the child is born Loretta convinces Always to take care of the child, who was named Apple.

=== After the Civil War ===
After the Civil War and the abolishment of slavery Always chooses to remain on the farm but not take care of Loretta, who unsuccessfully tries to threaten her into maintaining the status quo. Now home with Soon, Doak Jr tries to force Always into revealing the location of gold she helped his father bury, only for Always to tell him that she is his true mother. He initially tries to kill her in a rage, but stops as he knows that she's the only one who knows the location of the gold. Always tells him that she will not tell anyone that they are related as long as he buys her the land.

As time passes Always marries a quiet man named Time and has a child with him, Master More, however Doak Jr is still resentful towards her since he felt that she had bested him. Soon chooses to stay with Always and that he would wait to get married elsewhere. Upon hearing that the war is over, Peach and Sun return to the South to visit Always and see Plum's grave. They discuss living arrangements for Soon and Apple, who are able to access more educational opportunities since they could pass as white. Apple chooses to leave with Peach to Scotland in order to get an education, while Soon leaves with Sun to the North in order to become a veterinarian. Sun and Loretta reunite and she is invited to come live with him in the North as well.

Clora then fell asleep for about 50 years, and when she awoke, Sun was dead, Always was dying, and Peach was incredibly old. She realized that she had grandchildren and great-grandchildren living all over the world, some as White, others as Black and every color in between. She learns about the Ku Klux Klan and blames humanity for the violent repetition of history, calling to the audience and telling them that they need to change their point of view. She explains that everyone is related to one another, no matter ones race, and that it is the audience's job to realize that they are a part of the Human Family in order to stop the violence within humanity.

== Characters ==
- Clora: Clora is the narrator of the novel. After realizing that the slave master was going to kill her for protecting her child, she decided to concoct a poisonous tea for herself and her children. She did not want her children to continue living as slaves, especially without their mother. However, somehow she was the only one that died from the tea. Her spirit follows the lives of her four children (Always, Sun, Peach, and Plum), as well as their children. She is very family oriented and follows Always' life the closest.
- Always: Clora's oldest and most favorite child. A very hardworking girl who cares greatly about her siblings, especially Plum. After being enslaved in on a farm in Swallow-Land, with Loretta being one of her masters, she is then sold to a well-off land owner named Doak. After he rapes her and disregards Plum's death, Always vows to forever hate him. She tries to hate his wife, Wanda Sue, but she is too kind to her. Always becomes pregnant with Doak's child at the same time that Wanda Sue is pregnant, and during the birth of the children decides to switch the children so that her biological child is raised in a wealthy household rather than slavery.
- Sun: Clora's second oldest child and described as light-skinned enough to pass as white. As a child, he and his half-sister Loretta became close and devised a plan for Sun to escape Swallow-Land. After being taught how to read and write by his half-sister, Loretta and Sun attempted to get Sun up North. The first time, he was caught and almost killed as punishment. Him and Loretta were successful the second time, and Sun adopted the name “Mr. Freer” when he wrote to Loretta in order to try to buy his siblings. Sun was eventually hired by Mr. DuBois, a wealthy man in the food industry, and was eventually promoted within his various businesses. Sun ended up marrying Mr. DuBois's daughter and lived a wealthy lifestyle, never letting anyone know that he was the son of a slave.
- Peach: Clora's third oldest child, described as almost-white and very pretty. Sun taught her how to read and write, and her main job was within the main house, specifically taking care of Loretta's room. Loretta eventually asked her mother to sell Peach, who was sold to a nice gentleman looking for a slave to take care of his wife. His wife died eight months into the arrangement, and eventually the gentleman and Peach fell in love and got married. They moved to Scotland and lived in extreme wealth.
- Plum: Clora's youngest child, often described as a weak and very sickly. Always was her caretaker and when she learned that Always was sold, she attempted to stow away on the bottom of the buggy. However, due to the mechanism of the buggy, she was crushed and then bled to death.
- Loretta: The daughter of the Young Master of the Land as well as Always's, Sun's, Peach's, and Plum's half-sister. She is very selfish and high-maintenance, but had love for her brother, Sun. She helped him escape to the North, but was jealous when he asked her to help Peach so she got her sold. She eventually marries Master Doak and Wanda Sue dies, and her hatred for Always grows. She has a child with one of Always's children, who was named Apple.
- Master Doak: The man who purchases Always from Swallow-Land. He rapes and impregnates Always when she first arrives to his land. Described as mostly clueless to the going ons of his land and prefers for the slaves and his brother to work the land. He is the husband of Wanda Sue and the father of Doak Jr. After Wanda Sue died, he married Loretta. He dies while off at war.
- Wanda Sue: Master Doak's wife and the mother of Doak Jr. A kind and caring white woman who becomes very attached to Always. She dies during her second pregnancy, along with her second child. She never learns that the child she raised was never biologically hers.
- Doak Jr: The biological child of Always, but raised by Wanda Sue and Master Doak. As a child, he is best friends with Soon, but once Loretta comes into his life, his perspective changes as he grows into the role of a slave owner.
- Soon: The biological child of Wanda Sue, but raised by Always. He is friends with Doak Jr. and goes to war with him in order to protect him. He is raised as a slave even though he is actually white.

== Themes ==
Cooper uses the main narrator, Clora, as a vessel to speak to the audience members, which is unusual within common neo-slave narratives. Cooper's novel enacts rehabilitative storytelling, which forces readers to acknowledge the slave history within the United States as well and urges for social regeneration in the present. Cooper's novel gives its audience members a call to action and to work on ridding themselves of racists tendencies.

Cooper also discusses racial identity within the novel as most of the children, such as Sun, Peach, and Doak Jr. are biracial. The concept of passing as another race is demonstrated by Peach never discussing her racial background and only being able to take family members back to Scotland who appeared white. Similarly, the only reason that Sun was able to escape the South was because the color of his skin was so white. Within the novel, Cooper demonstrates both how passing for a different race was used as a method for survival, as well as the pointlessness for discriminating against one another via race.

== Critical reception ==
Critical reception for the novel has been positive. In an article for the CLA Journal, Cynthia Downing Bryant noted that Family provides an "extensive exploration of the benefits and consequences of passing" but that Cooper "consistently makes it clear that passing may be a means to an end, but it simply cannot yield true self-liberation." The novel has also been praised alongside Cooper's 1998 The Wake of the Wind as "historically grounded studies of the horror and complexity of slaver and its aftereffects. Both novels add to our understanding of some of the more difficult aspects of African American life since the mid-to-late 1800s."

A reviewer for The Washington Post was critical in their review, stating that "the book suffers from a flat first-person narrative that does not allow the characters to take life, a serious lack of information about slavery and a tendency to cliche: "But life and time just kept movin on, like it always does." Roy Hoffman for The New York Times was more positive, calling it "the sort of book that ought to be read out loud".

During an author tour, a reviewer at the Literary Guild and Doubleday Book Club, delivered a review for Publishers Weekly stating that "with power and grace, Cooper weaves the dialect, style and myths of the South into a portrait of the hell that was slavery."
