= FAMILIA (lay apostolate) =

FAMILIA's logo

FAMILIA is an apostolate affiliated with the Regnum Christi Federation, founded in Minneapolis, Minnesota, designed to strengthen Christian family life. It stands for FAMIly Life In America. As the director in Edmonton summarized it to the Western Catholic Reporter, "Familia was put together from what Pope John Paul II said about family."

== History ==
Familia was founded in 1993 by Paul and Libbie Sellors as a four-year program of catechetical formation. The series moves from encyclical to encyclical, and then through the Universal Catechism in a coherent way that creates the building blocks of faith.

In 2009, it co-sponsored the National Marriage Conference with the Diocese of Lexington. In 2012, the former communications director was hired as Family life coordinator for the Archdiocese of St. Paul and Minneapolis.

In 2012, the Cana Family Institute assumed the apostolate with the intent of relaunching it in conjunction with other marriage and family programs.

== Program ==
The center of FAMILA is a regular meeting that includes a Gospel reflection, catechesis, study of a magisterial document related on family life, and a resolution. The materials are prepared by those with graduate-level ecclesiastical degrees in theology and is designed to study the magisterial documents sequentially. Beyond this meeting, FAMILIA trains and equips the leaders and provides different helps to improve family life.

FAMILIA usually exists as part of parish or diocesan structures in a variety of parishes throughout Canada, the US, and the Philippines.
