= Family: the web series =

Episodic 2008 web series

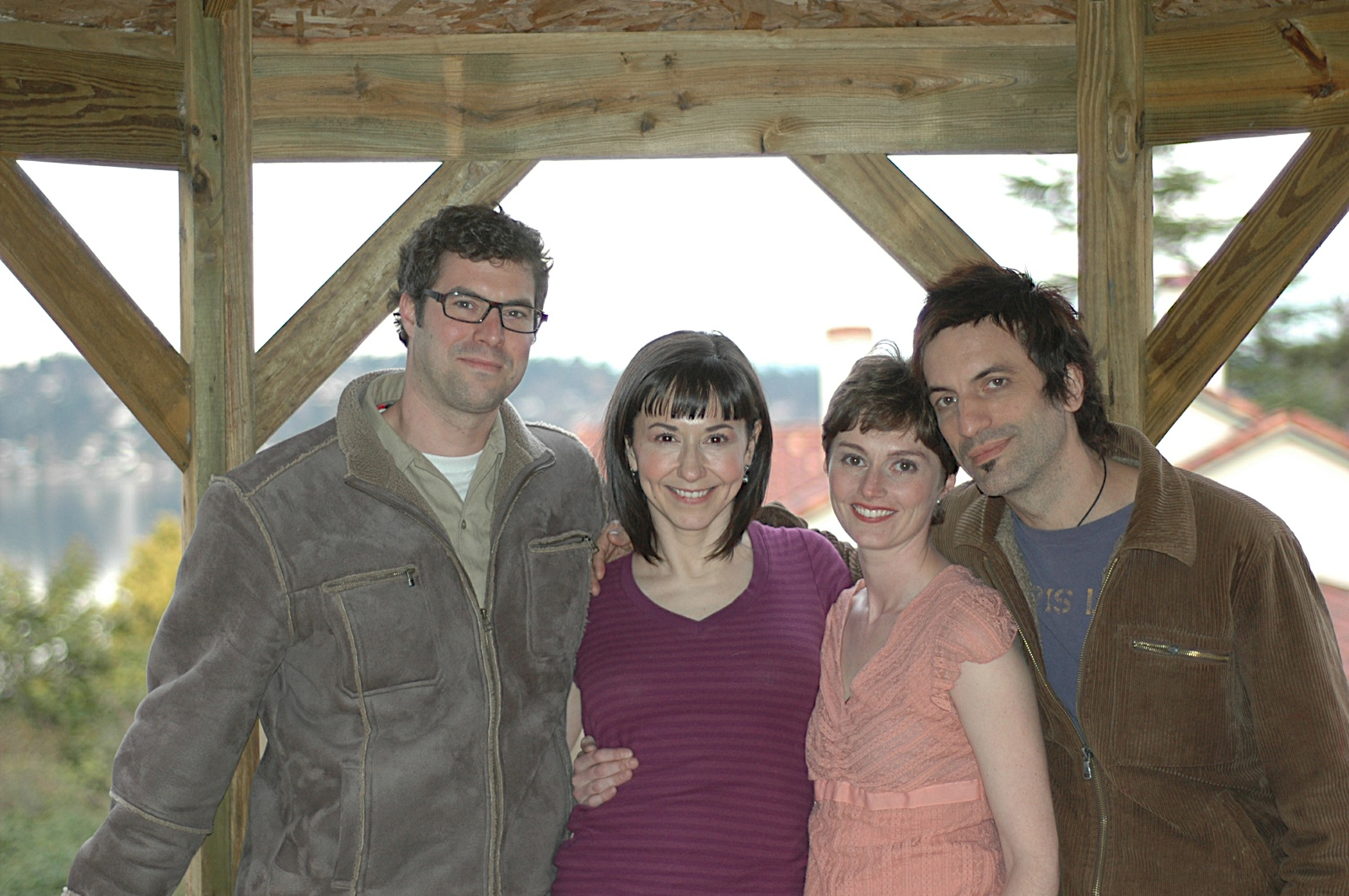
From left: Ernie Joseph, Terisa Greenan, Amber Rack, Eric Smiley

Family: the web series is an episodic 2008 web series created by actress and filmmaker Terisa Greenan, based loosely on her own life of polyamory with her two male partners. Greenan wrote and directed the show, and acted in a small supporting role. Some episodes were co-written by Matt Bullen.

== Premise ==
The series explores the fictional lives of Gemma (Amber Rack), Ben (Ernie Joseph) and Stuart (Eric Smiley), who live in Seattle as a polyamorous "V" triad. Greenan began the web series while she was between acting jobs in the autumn of 2008.

== Accolades ==
By early 2009, the show had received national attention, including an invitation from the Kinsey Institute for Research in Sex, Gender and Reproduction to include a DVD of the web series in the "polyamory" section of their library.

Greenan and "Family: the web series" have gone on to be profiled by numerous national and international newspapers, magazines, television shows and radio programs, including being featured on the television show The O'Reilly Factor.

Mistress Matisse featured and commented on many episodes of "Family" on her blog.

== Release ==
A total of 21 episodes were produced, originally released between Nov. 15, 2008, and Oct. 31, 2009. As with webisodes in general, run length is much briefer than broadcast programming. (The first episode, "Not What the Neighbors Think," runs 6:19.) The DVD release of Season One has a total runtime of 120 minutes.

The production company, 3dogpictures.com, currently sells shoes wholesale.
