= Rocky Krsnich =

American baseball player (1927–2019)

- Third baseman
- Born: August 5, 1927; West Allis, Wisconsin, U.S.
- Died: February 14, 2019 (aged 91); Overland Park, Kansas, U.S.
- Batted: Right Threw: Right

MLB debut
- September 13, 1949, for the Chicago White Sox

Last MLB appearance
- September 26, 1953, for the Chicago White Sox

MLB statistics
- Batting average: .215
- Home runs: 3
- Runs batted in: 38
- Stats at Baseball Reference

Teams
- Chicago White Sox (1949, 1952–1953)

Rocky Krsnich (born Rocco Peter Krznić; August 5, 1927 – February 14, 2019) was an American Major League Baseball third baseman.

== Biography ==
He was born in West Allis, Wisconsin. Krsnich originally signed as a free agent in 1945 with the Philadelphia Phillies. The following year, he joined the New York Yankees organization. In 1948, Krsnich was selected in the Minor League Draft by the Chicago White Sox. During his time with the White Sox, Krsnich played at the Major League level in 1949, as well as in 1952 and 1953. Later he was traded along with Saul Rogovin and Connie Ryan to the Cincinnati Reds for Willard Marshall. He is the brother of former MLB player Mike Krsnich. Krsnich died February 14, 2019.
