= The Family (Puccetti) =

- Artist: Joseph Puccetti
- Year: 1982
- Type: stainless steel
- Dimensions: 370 cm × 91 cm × 61 cm (147 in × 36 in × 24 in)
- Location: West Allis Public Library; 43.011936°N 88.005582°W
- Owner: City of West Allis Department of Public Works

The Family is a public art work by artist Joseph Puccetti that depicts an abstract man, woman and child encircled by a ring. It was originally located in front of the West Allis City Hall in downtown West Allis, Wisconsin. In 2006, the sculpture was moved to the West Allis Public Library. The sculpture is made of stainless steel. The work was donated by the artist.
