= La Familia Cosmovision =

Defunct Spanish-language network

- Type: Spanish cable television network
- Country: United States

Ownership
- Owner: The Inspiration Networks

History
- Launched: May 2002
- Closed: December 31, 2014

La Familia Cosmovision was a Spanish-language television network that emphasized traditional Hispanic family values. The channel was launched in 2002, owned by The Inspiration Networks. It aired religious programming as well as movies, telenovelas, cooking shows, talk shows and newscasts. On December 31, 2014, the channel ceased operations after 12 years.

== History ==
The network started broadcasting in May 2002 after INSP signed a distribution agreement to carry LFN. The network was created to fill in a gap in the Hispanic market, where moral-driven programming was lacking. Ahead of launch, La Familia Network pledged to produce a wide array of original content. Most of its production was done in Texas, although the channel was based in Charlotte, North Carolina. In August 2003, LFN signed a commercial agreement with WorldLink.

In October 2007, LFC was made available in Puerto Rico, with carriage on Choice Cable, reaching 94,000 subscribers. It was working to deliver its signal online, but the process was delayed after hardware problems with the manufacturing of the boxes in South Korea, moving instead to China, causing a six-month delay.

On November 12, 2012, the network started broadcasting sixteen programs from the US Hispanic network SOi TV. The following month, the channel was sold to Imagina US, making it a sister channel to the US version of Pasiones.
