= Family Butte =

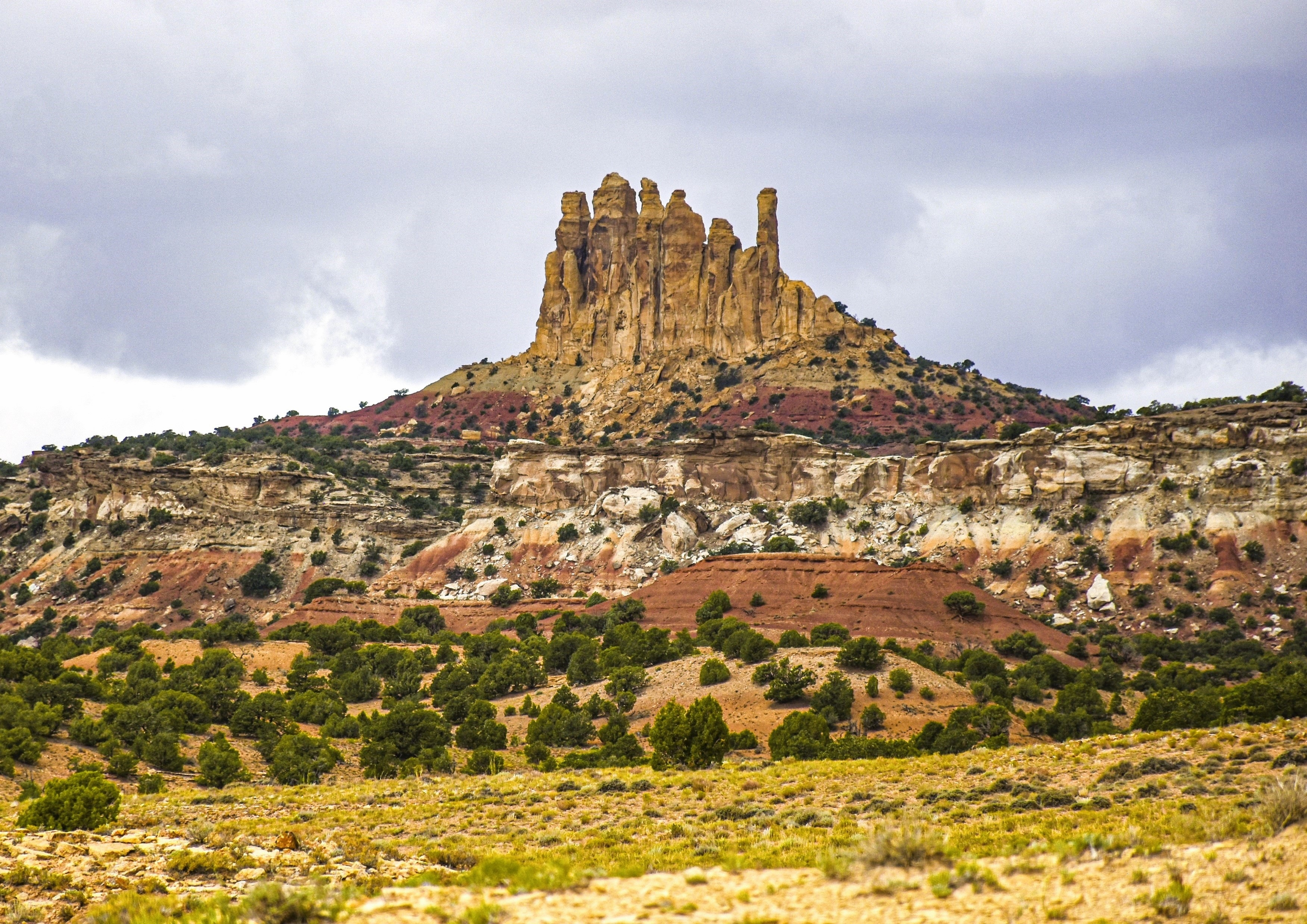
- Southeast aspect

Highest point
- Elevation: 7,405 ft (2,257 m)
- Prominence: 492 ft (150 m)
- Parent peak: Turkey Tower (7,595 ft)
- Isolation: 1.69 mi (2.72 km)
- Coordinates: 38°45′55″N 110°50′37″W

Geography
- Location within Utah Location within the United States
- Country: United States
- State: Utah
- County: Emery
- Parent range: Colorado Plateau; San Rafael Swell
- Topo map: USGS San Rafael Knob

Geology
- Rock age: Triassic
- Rock type: Sandstone

Climbing
- First ascent: 1990
- Easiest route: class 5.10 climbing

Family Butte is a 7,405-foot-elevation (2,257-meter) summit in Emery County, Utah, United States.

== Description ==
Family Butte is located 28 miles (45 km) north of Hanksville, Utah, in the San Rafael Swell on land managed by the US Bureau of Land Management. Precipitation runoff from this butte's south and east slopes drains into Little Ocean Draw → Chute Canyon → Wild Horse Creek → Muddy Creek → Dirty Devil River → Colorado River, whereas the north and west slopes drain to Muddy Creek via Reds Canyon. Topographic relief is significant as the summit rises 700 feet (213 meters) above surrounding terrain in 0.25 miles (0.40 km). Access is via Red Canyon Loop (County Road 1019). This landform's toponym has been officially adopted by the United States Board on Geographic Names.

== Geology ==
The towers of Family Butte are composed of cliff-forming Wingate Sandstone, which is the remains of wind-borne sand dunes deposited approximately 200 million years ago in the Late Triassic. Below the towers is strata of the upper and lower members of the slope-forming Chinle Formation, also of Late Triassic age. The Chinle overlays the Moody Canyon and Torrey members of the Moenkopi Formation (Early Triassic) which covers the surrounding terrain. These rocks were uplifted during the Laramide Orogeny and subjected to forces of erosion which created the butte left standing today.

== Climbing ==
The first ascent of the Middle Tower was made October 29, 1990, by James Garrett and Alan Murphy.

Rock-climbing routes on Family Butte:

- Middle Tower (Daughter) - class 5.11 - James Garrett, Alan Murphy - (1990)
- Middle Tower (Northwest Face) - class 5.9
- North Tower (Mexican Gravy Pants) - class 5.x - Cameron Burns, Benny Bach - (1993)
- South Tower (North Face) - class 5.10 - Dave Martin, Mike Tea - (1997)
- Mother Tower (Northwest Face) - class 5.10 - (2002)
- Mother Tower (Rising Sons) - class 5.9 - Shingo Ohkawa, Paul Ross, Andy Ross - (2022)

== Climate ==
Spring and fall are the most favorable seasons to visit Family Butte. According to the Köppen climate classification system, it is located in a cold semi-arid climate zone, with temperatures averaging between 0 °F to 30 °F in January, and 50 °F to 100 °F in July. Typical of high deserts, summer temperatures can be exceedingly hot, while winter temperatures can be very cold. Snowfall is common, but the snow melts rapidly in the arid and sunny climate. Rainfall is very low, and the evaporation rate classifies the area as desert, even though the rainfall exceeds 10 inches.

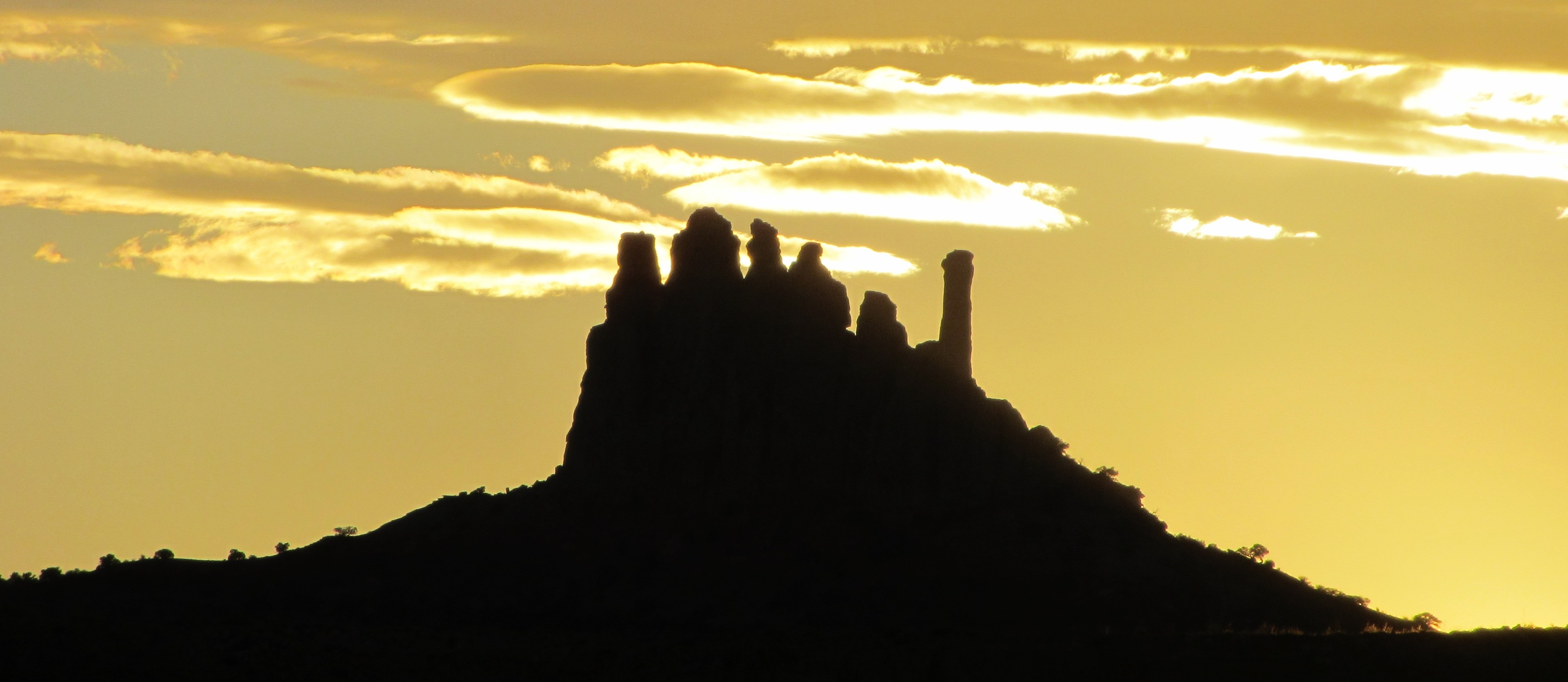
Family Butte sunset
