= West Allis, Wisconsin =

- City
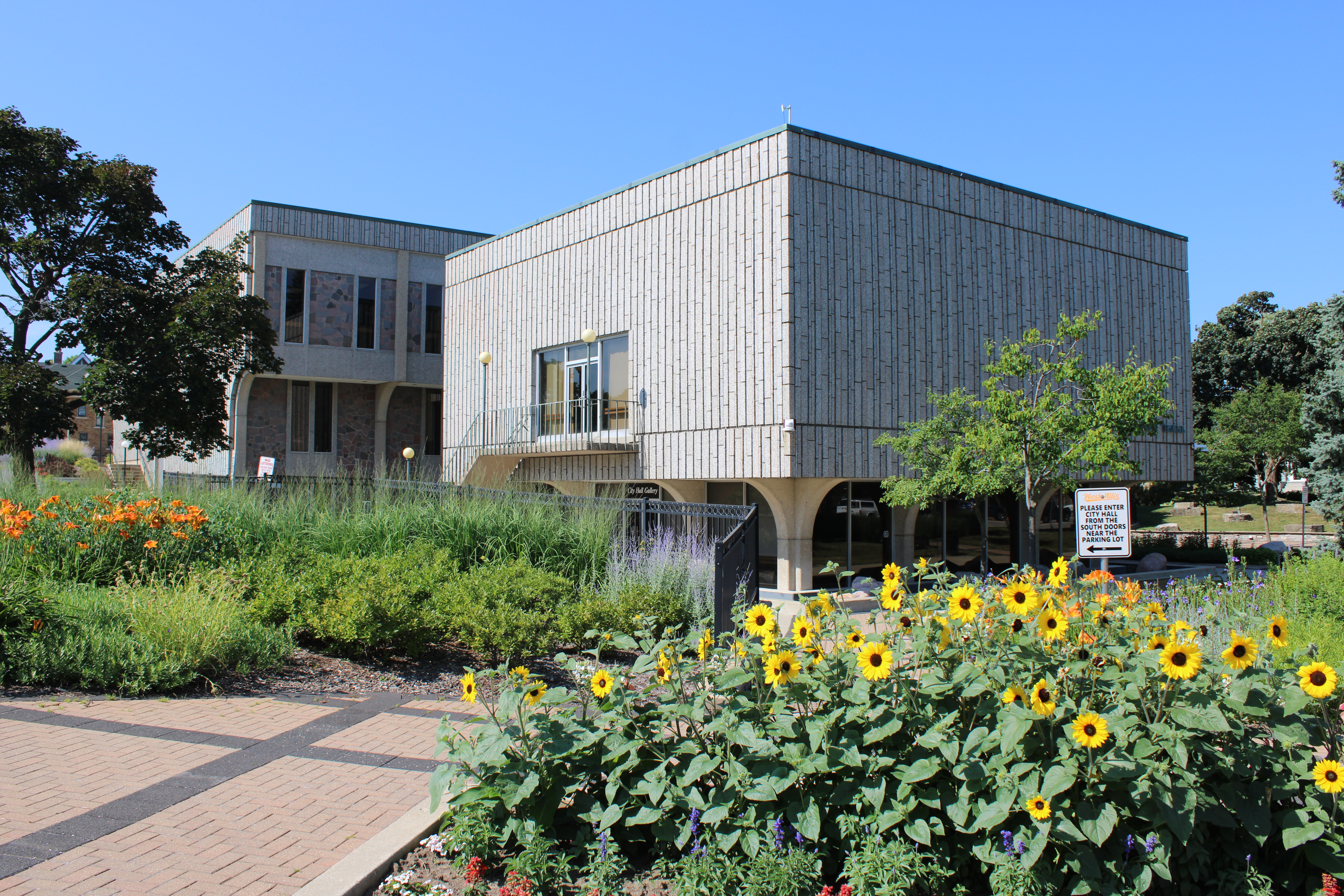
- West Allis City Hall

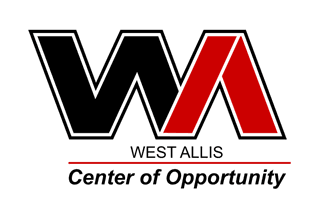
- Flag
- Interactive map of West Allis, Wisconsin
- Location within Wisconsin Location within the United States
- Coordinates: 43°0′29″N 88°1′6″W
- Country: United States
- State: Wisconsin
- County: Milwaukee

Government
  - Type: Mayor-Council
  - Mayor: Dan Devine

Area
  - Total: 11.41 sq mi (29.54 km^{2})
  - Land: 11.38 sq mi (29.48 km^{2})
  - Water: 0.023 sq mi (0.06 km^{2})
- Elevation: 728 ft (222 m)

Population (2020)
  - Total: 60,325
  - Estimate (2021): 59,484
  - Density: 5,262.2/sq mi (2,031.73/km^{2})
- Time zone: UTC−6 (Central (CST))
  - Summer (DST): UTC−5 (CDT)
- Zip Code: 53214, 53227, 53219
- Area code: 414
- FIPS code: 55-85300
- GNIS feature ID: 1576439
- Website: westalliswi.gov

West Allis is a city in Milwaukee County, Wisconsin, United States. A suburb of Milwaukee, it is part of the Milwaukee metropolitan area. The population was 60,325 at the 2020 census, making it the eleventh-most populous city in Wisconsin.

== History ==
The name West Allis derives from Edward P. Allis, whose Edward P. Allis Company was a large Milwaukee-area manufacturing firm in the late 19th century. In 1901, the Allis company became Allis-Chalmers. In 1902, the company built a large new manufacturing plant west of its existing plant. The locale in which the new plant was constructed was at the time called North Greenfield; prior to the 1880s, the area had been called Honey Creek. With the building of the western Allis plant, the area was incorporated as the Village of West Allis, and it became the City of West Allis in 1906.

With the presence of Allis-Chalmers, the largest manufacturer in the area, West Allis became the largest suburb of Milwaukee in the early 20th century. After that, West Allis grew quickly. Between 1910 and 1930, its population grew fivefold. After 1965, the Allis-Chalmers company's fortunes had turned. By 1985, Allis-Chalmers' global workforce had shrunk to 13,000 from its peak of 31,000. Allis-Chalmers would then declare bankruptcy in 1987, closing their last Milwaukee office in 1999.

== Geography ==
West Allis is located at 43°0′29″N 88°1′6″W (43.00, −88.02). The upper courses of the Root and Kinnickinnic Rivers flow through the city. According to the United States Census Bureau, the city has a total area of 11.41 square miles (29.55 km^{2}), of which 11.39 square miles (29.50 km^{2}) is land and 0.02 square miles (0.05 km^{2}) is water.

=== Climate ===
Climate data for West Allis, Wisconsin (1991–2020 normals, extremes 1948–2011, 2023–present)
Month	Jan	Feb	Mar	Apr	May	Jun	Jul	Aug	Sep	Oct	Nov	Dec	Year
Record high °F (°C)	58 (14)	73 (23)	82 (28)	92 (33)	95 (35)	102 (39)	104 (40)	101 (38)	99 (37)	91 (33)	75 (24)	70 (21)	102 (39)
Mean daily maximum °F (°C)	30.8 (−0.7)	33.9 (1.1)	45.1 (7.3)	56.8 (13.8)	69.8 (21.0)	79.9 (26.6)	84.7 (29.3)	83.0 (28.3)	76.5 (24.7)	61.9 (16.6)	47.5 (8.6)	36.2 (2.3)	58.8 (14.9)
Daily mean °F (°C)	22.8 (−5.1)	25.5 (−3.6)	35.9 (2.2)	46.6 (8.1)	58.7 (14.8)	69.0 (20.6)	73.9 (23.3)	72.4 (22.4)	65.4 (18.6)	52.0 (11.1)	38.9 (3.8)	28.4 (−2.0)	49.1 (9.5)
Mean daily minimum °F (°C)	14.7 (−9.6)	17.1 (−8.3)	26.6 (−3.0)	36.5 (2.5)	47.6 (8.7)	58.1 (14.5)	63.1 (17.3)	61.9 (16.6)	54.3 (12.4)	42.0 (5.6)	30.2 (−1.0)	20.6 (−6.3)	39.4 (4.1)
Record low °F (°C)	−26 (−32)	−15 (−26)	−12 (−24)	13 (−11)	26 (−3)	36 (2)	38 (3)	41 (5)	32 (0)	20 (−7)	−6 (−21)	−21 (−29)	−26 (−32)
Average precipitation inches (mm)	2.23 (57)	2.15 (55)	2.53 (64)	3.70 (94)	4.32 (110)	5.03 (128)	3.73 (95)	4.34 (110)	3.69 (94)	3.08 (78)	2.31 (59)	2.25 (57)	39.36 (1,000)
Average snowfall inches (cm)	13.5 (34)	13.6 (35)	8.3 (21)	2.1 (5.3)	0.0 (0.0)	0.0 (0.0)	0.0 (0.0)	0.0 (0.0)	0.0 (0.0)	0.1 (0.25)	1.4 (3.6)	13.3 (34)	52.3 (133)
Average precipitation days (≥ 0.01 in)	10.2	10.9	11.3	11.4	13.8	12.7	9.9	10.0	8.7	12.3	10.9	12.2	134.3
Average snowy days (≥ 0.1 in)	8.0	8.2	4.9	1.2	0.0	0.0	0.0	0.0	0.0	0.2	2.2	8.4	33.1
Source: NOAA

== Demographics ==
Historical population
Census	Pop.	Note	%±
1910	6,645		—
1920	13,745		106.8%
1930	34,671		152.2%
1940	36,364		4.9%
1950	42,959		18.1%
1960	68,157		58.7%
1970	71,723		5.2%
1980	63,982		−10.8%
1990	63,221		−1.2%
2000	61,254		−3.1%
2010	60,411		−1.4%
2020	60,325		−0.1%
2021 (est.)	59,484		−1.4%
U.S. Decennial Census

=== 2020 census ===
As of the 2020 census, West Allis had a population of 60,325. The median age was 38.7 years. 20.3% of residents were under the age of 18 and 16.3% of residents were 65 years of age or older. For every 100 females there were 98.2 males, and for every 100 females age 18 and over there were 95.9 males age 18 and over.

100.0% of residents lived in urban areas, while 0.0% lived in rural areas.

There were 27,495 households in West Allis, of which 24.0% had children under the age of 18 living in them. Of all households, 32.7% were married-couple households, 26.0% were households with a male householder and no spouse or partner present, and 31.9% were households with a female householder and no spouse or partner present. About 39.5% of all households were made up of individuals and 13.9% had someone living alone who was 65 years of age or older.

There were 29,015 housing units, of which 5.2% were vacant. The homeowner vacancy rate was 1.3% and the rental vacancy rate was 4.9%.

Racial composition as of the 2020 census
Race	Number	Percent
White	44,286	73.4%
Black or African American	3,818	6.3%
American Indian and Alaska Native	787	1.3%
Asian	1,545	2.6%
Native Hawaiian and Other Pacific Islander	23	0.0%
Some other race	3,615	6.0%
Two or more races	6,251	10.4%
Hispanic or Latino (of any race)	10,211	16.9%

=== 2010 census ===
As of the census of 2010, there were 60,411 people, 27,454 households, and 14,601 families living in the city. The population density was 5,303.9 inhabitants per square mile (2,047.8/km^{2}). There were 29,353 housing units at an average density of 2,577.1 per square mile (995.0/km^{2}). The racial makeup of the city was 87% White, 3.3% African American, 1.1% Native American, 2.0% Asian, 3.6% from other races, and 2.9% from two or more races. Hispanic or Latino of any race were 9.6% of the population.

There were 27,454 households, of which 25.8% had children under the age of 18 living with them, 36.3% were married couples living together, 11.9% had a female householder with no husband present, 5.0% had a male householder with no wife present, and 46.8% were non-families. 38.6% of all households were made up of individuals, and 13.3% had someone living alone who was 65 years of age or older. The average household size was 2.17 and the average family size was 2.90.

The median age in the city was 37.7 years. 20.5% of residents were under the age of 18; 8.3% were between the ages of 18 and 24; 30.1% were from 25 to 44; 26.5% were from 45 to 64; and 14.6% were 65 years of age or older. The gender makeup of the city was 49.0% male and 51.0% female.

=== 2000 census ===
As of the census of 2000, there were 61,254 people, 27,604 households, and 15,375 families living in the city. The population density was 5,397.6 people per square mile (2,083.7/km^{2}). There were 28,708 housing units at an average density of 2,529.7 per square mile (976.6/km^{2}). The racial makeup of the city was 94.03% White, 1.34% African American, 0.70% Native American, 1.33% Asian, 0.02% Pacific Islander, 1.18% from other races, and 1.41% from two or more races. Hispanic or Latino of any race were 3.52% of the population.

There were 27,604 households, out of which 25.5% had children under the age of 18 living with them, 41.2% were married couples living together, 10.6% had a female householder with no husband present, and 44.3% were non-families. 37.3% of all households were made up of individuals, and 14.0% had someone living alone who was 65 years of age or older. The average household size was 2.19 and the average family size was 2.92.

In the city, the population was spread out, with 21.5% under the age of 18, 8.4% from 18 to 24, 32.3% from 25 to 44, 20.5% from 45 to 64, and 17.2% who were 65 years of age or older. The median age was 38 years. For every 100 females, there were 93.0 males. For every 100 females age 18 and over, there were 90.0 males.

The median income for a household in the city was $39,394, and the median income for a family was $50,732. Males had a median income of $36,926 versus $26,190 for females. The per capita income for the city was $20,914. About 4.6% of families and 6.5% of the population were below the poverty line, including 9.0% of those under age 18 and 5.6% of those age 65 or over.

== Arts and culture ==
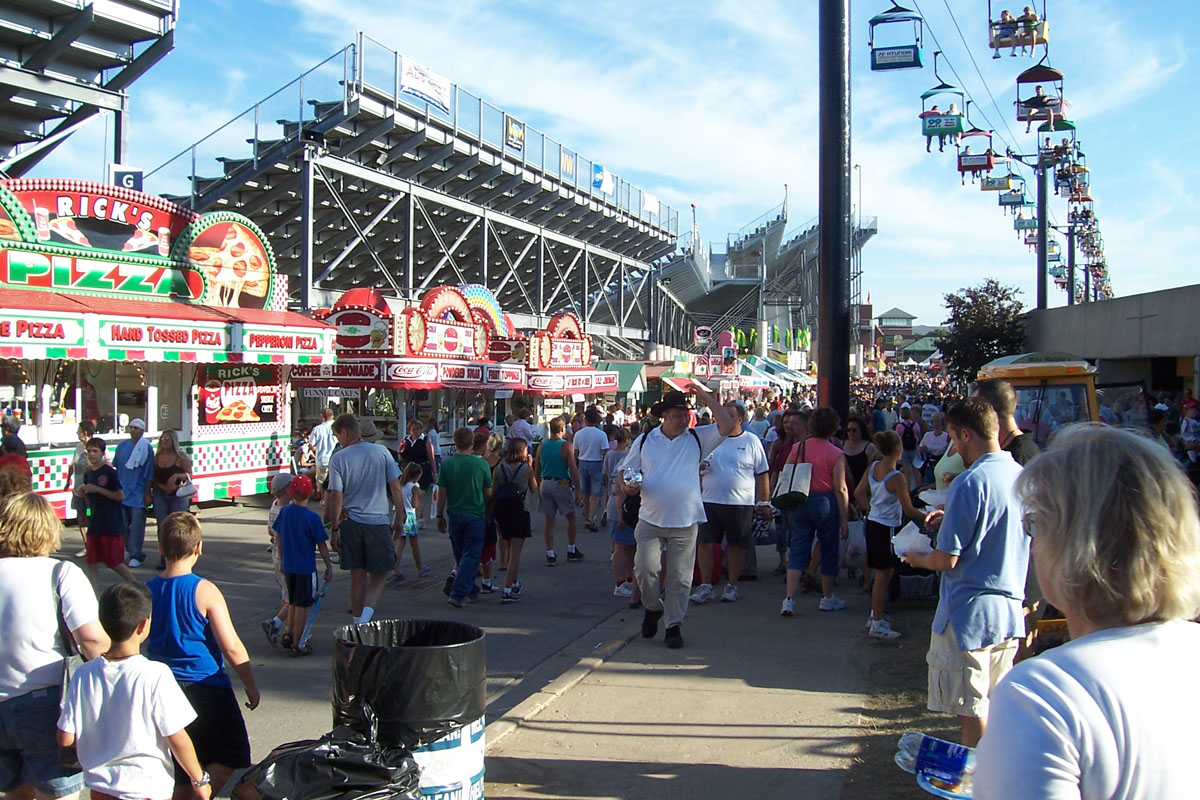
Wisconsin State Fair

The Wisconsin State Fair Park, which includes the Milwaukee Mile and is the site of the annual Wisconsin State Fair, is located in West Allis.

The West Allis Post Office contains two oil on canvas murals, Wisconsin Wild Flowers – Spring and Wisconsin Wild Flowers – Autumn, painted in 1943 by Frances Foy. Murals were produced from 1934 to 1943 in the United States through the Section of Painting and Sculpture, later called the Section of Fine Arts, of the Treasury Department.

Candy Cane Lane runs through Oklahoma and Montana Avenues and 92nd to 96th Street. Residents have been creating elaborate Christmas display since 1984, bringing bumper-to-bumper traffic through the streets on December nights. The festive event has raised over $2.2 million for the MACC Fund.

On June 15, 2006, the city celebrated its 100th anniversary. The celebration included a parade, fireworks and a family festival.

== Sports ==
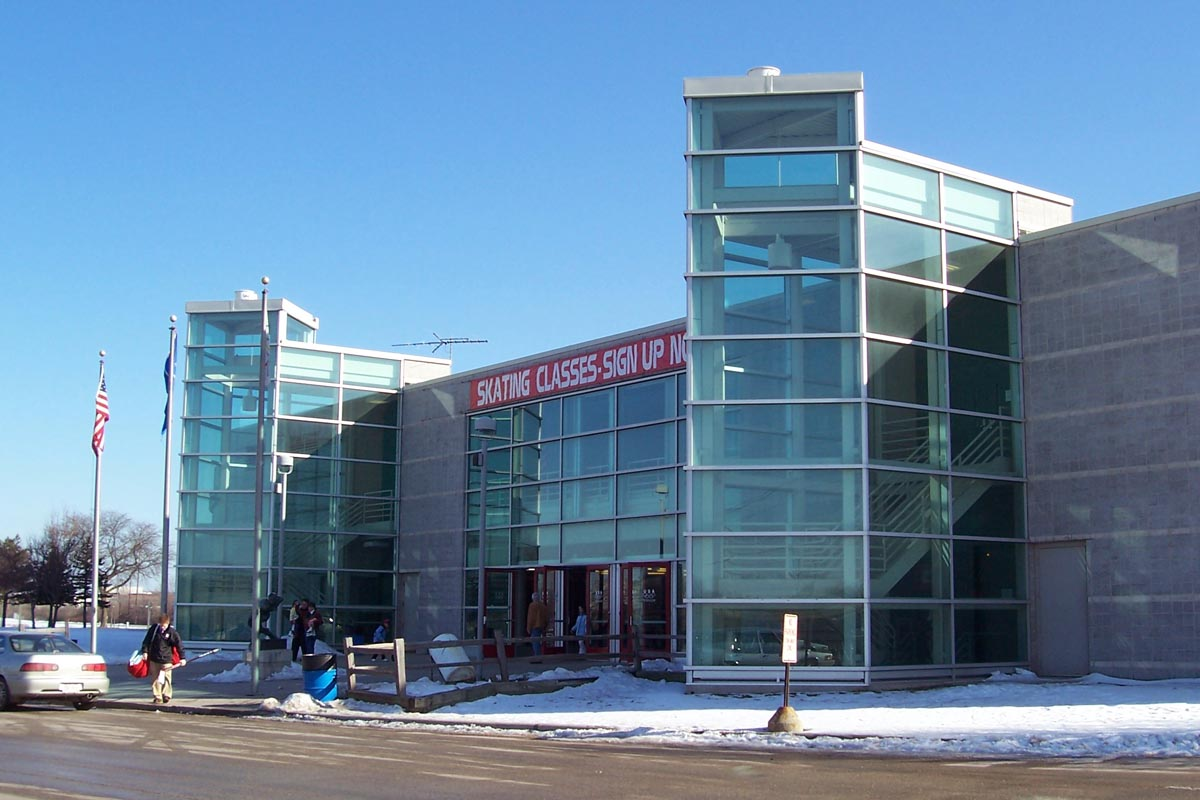
Pettit National Ice Center

Pettit National Ice Center is one of only two indoor speed skating rinks in the United States.

West Allis is also the location of the Milwaukee Mile, the world's oldest racing facility.

== Transportation ==
West Allis is served by MCTS Routes 18, 28, 44U, 51, 53, 54, 56, 64, 76, and 92.

Interstate 94 and Interstate 41/Interstate 894 also run through the city.

Portions of the Hank Aaron State Trail run through the city near its northern border. Since 2021, the city has a complete streets policy, requiring new road projects to be designed to meet the needs of all users—pedestrians, cyclists, transit riders, motorists, and others—whenever possible.

The Union Pacific Waukesha Subdivision (former Chicago & North Western) runs through West Allis.The line once extended to Lancaster on the southwest corner of Wisconsin. The line has since been abandoned in sections.

The Milwaukee Electric Railway & Light Company had lines running concurrently through West Allis along the right of way of present day Interstate 894. They split at St. Martins Junction and went south to Burlington and west to East Troy.

== Education ==
The schools in the West Allis – West Milwaukee School District:

- Franklin Elementary School
- Hoover Elementary School
- Horace Mann Elementary School
- Irving Elementary School
- Jefferson Elementary School
- Longfellow Elementary School
- Madison Elementary School
- Mitchell Elementary School
- Pershing Elementary School
- Walker Elementary School
- Wilson Elementary School
- Frank Lloyd Wright Intermediate School
- Lane Intermediate School
- West Milwaukee Intermediate School
- West Allis Central High School
- Nathan Hale High School
- James E. Dottke High School

The Wisconsin Evangelical Lutheran Synod has two grade school in West Allis:

- Good Shepherd Lutheran School
- Lamb of God Lutheran School

== Government ==
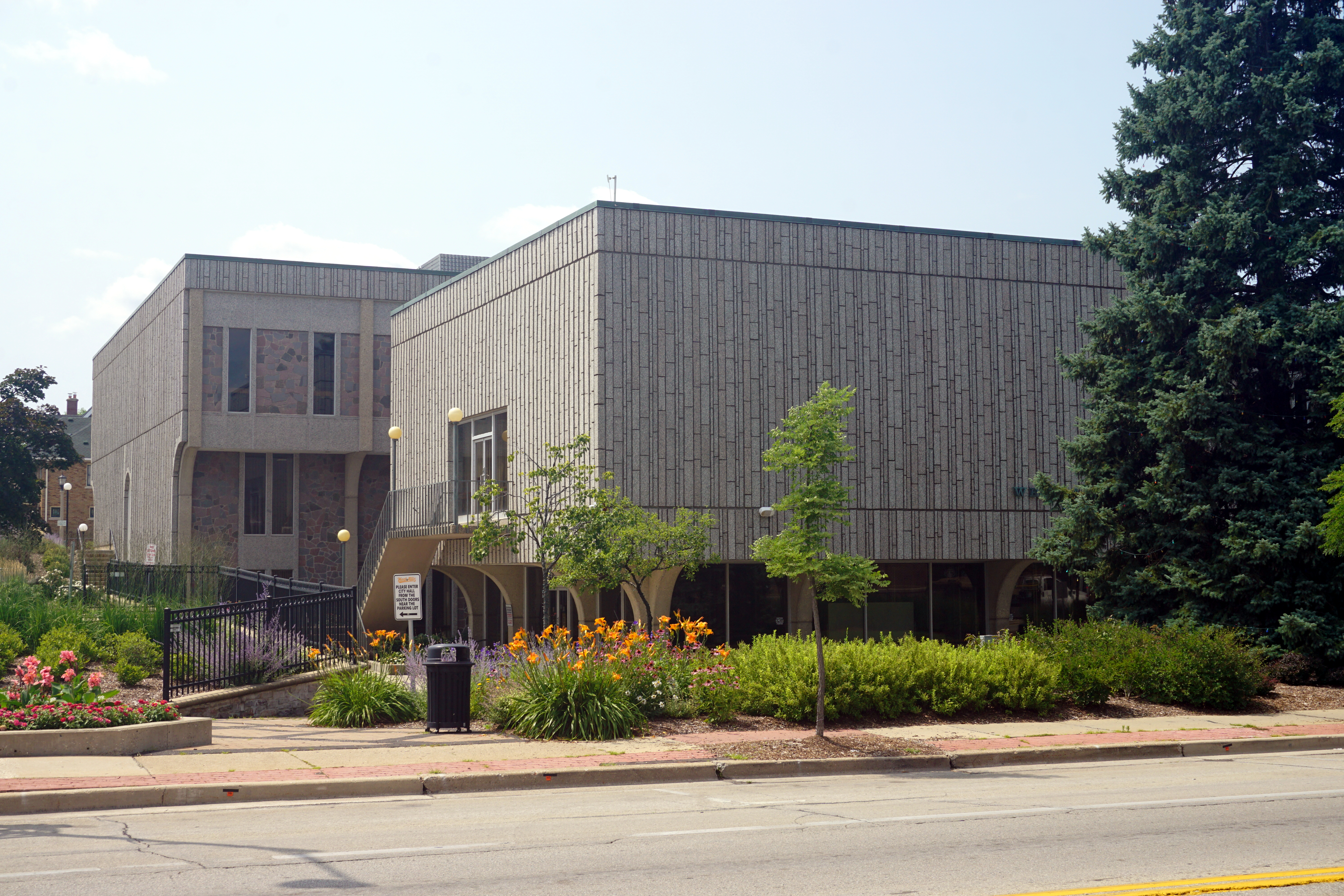
West Allis City Hall

West Allis is represented by Scott L. Fitzgerald (R) in the United States House of Representatives, and by Ron Johnson (R) and Tammy Baldwin (D) in the United States Senate. Tim Carpenter (D) and Dale P. Kooyenga (R) represent West Allis in the Wisconsin State Senate, and Daniel Riemer (D), Tom Michalski (R), and Joe Sanfelippo (R) represent West Allis in the Wisconsin State Assembly. Parts of northern West Allis are represented by Rob Hutton (R) in Senate District 5 and Robyn Vining (D) in Assembly District 14, districts traditionally associated with the cities of Brookfield and Wauwatosa.

== Notable businesses ==
- Allis-Chalmers, since closed
- Siemens Power Corporation, now on former Allis-Chalmers grounds
- Quad Graphics, printer
- WDJT-TV (Channel 58, CBS), WMLW-TV (Channel 49, IND), WBME-CD (Channel 41, Me-TV) and WYTU-LD (Channel 63, Telemundo), Weigel Broadcasting stations with studios located on South 60th Street in a former Allis-Chalmers building
- West Allis Speedskating Club

== Notable people ==
- Jared Abbrederis (born 1990), National Football League player
- Arthur J. Balzer (1895–1962), Wisconsin state representative
- Gary J. Barczak (born 1939), Wisconsin state representative
- Jeannette Bell (born 1941), former mayor of West Allis and legislator
- Aimee Betro (born 1979), convicted of attempting to carry out a contract killing in the UK
- Dave Cieslewicz (born 1959), former mayor of Madison, Wisconsin
- Jeffrey Dahmer (1960–1994), serial killer
- Terry A. Davis (1969–2018), computer programmer and creator of TempleOS
- Tighe Dombrowski (born 1982), professional soccer player
- Julius Fiege (1861–1918), Wisconsin state representative
- Michael Gableman (born 1966), lawyer and former Wisconsin Supreme Court justice
- Jerry Golsteyn (born 1954), NFL player
- Jaida Essence Hall, drag queen
- George C. Hinkley (1862–1936), Wisconsin state representative
- Martin F. Howard (1892–1969), Wisconsin state representative
- Robert T. Huber (1920–1991), Wisconsin legislator
- Donald J. Hying (born 1963), Roman Catholic bishop
- Jeff Jagodzinski (born 1963), NFL assistant coach
- Dan Jansen (born 1965), world champion speedskater, Olympic gold medalist
- Richard A. Knobloch (1918–2001), U.S. Air Force general
- Mehryn Kraker (born 1994), former WNBA player
- Mike Krsnich (1931–2011), MLB player
- Rocky Krsnich (1927–2019), MLB player
- Harvey Kuenn (1930–1988), MLB player and manager
- Liberace (1919–1987), entertainer and pianist
- Alex McRae, professional Baseball Pitcher for The Chicago White Sox
- Chellsie Memmel (born 1988), world champion gymnast, 2008 Olympic silver medalist
- James Melka (born 1962), NFL player
- Dawn Miceli, comedian, podcast host, and member of Rasputina (band)
- Delbert Miller, Wisconsin legislator
- Billy Mitchell (1879–1936), distinguished U.S. Army general
- Nick Pearson (born 1979), Olympic athlete, national champion speedskater
- Eugene A. Phalen (1876–1940), Wisconsin legislator
- Tony Staskunas (born 1961), Wisconsin legislator
- Owen Turtenwald (born 1989), Hall of Fame "Magic the Gathering" player
- Ricky Wagner (born 1989), Wisconsin Badgers, NFL player
- Jane Wiedlin (born 1958), rhythm guitarist of The Go-Go's, actress
- Tony Willman (1907–1941), professional race car driver
- Jerry L. Wing (1923–1994), Wisconsin businessman and politician
- Gabriel Zophy (1869–1947), Wisconsin politician

== See also ==
- The Family
