= Djakout Mizik =

Haitian compas band

- Origin: Haiti
- Genres: Compas
- Years active: 1986-Present
- Members: Auguste "Pouchon" Duverger; Rolls "Roro" Lainé; Etzer "Ti-Pouch" Charlemagne; Louimane "Mamàn" Absolu; Polo Thugkompa; Duckenson "Didi Santana" Fontaine
- Past members: Gracia Delva, Hervé "Shabba" Anthénor; Reginald "Ti-Regi" Bastien; Elie Lapointe; Tony Jean-Baptiste; Constantin "Tcheck" Joseph; Fabrice Rouzier; Dominique Lauture; Patrice Millet; Carel Alexandre; Michel-Henry Jeannot; Nickenson Prud'homme; Claude Marcelin; David Dupoux Philippe Monfort, Bernard Gousse

Djakout Mizik is a Haitian compas band that helped popularize a new electronic section of the compas genre called nouvelle génération (new generation). The band drew inspiration from earlier compas music artists like System Band and Tabou Combo.

On New Year's Eve 2007, they performed with Wyclef Jean on MTV, which was their first exposure on a nationally televised American network. In 2010, Djakout Mizik divided into two distinct bands; one retained the original name "Djakout Mizik", with the second band taking the name "Djakout #1".

== Studio albums ==
- Defi Leve
- Jistis
- Live Biznis pa m'
- Mannigueta
- Love Songs
- Live Mechan Mechan
- La Familia
- Septieme Ciel

== Discography ==
Title	Release date	Label
Dedouble	1995	Geronimo Records
Moso Lanmou	1998	Antilles Mizik
Septieme Ciel	2000	Antilles Mizik
La Familia	2001	Nouvel Jenerasyon
Mannigueta	2003	Z-Bo Entertainment Inc.
Jistis	2006	Tropikal Records Inc.
Pwofité (Djakout #1)	2010	Tropikal Records Inc.
Lod Nan Dezod (Djakout #1)	2014	Tropikal Records Inc.
Nou Pap Domi Deyo; Ou Pa Kontan; Vin'n Bat Mwen (Djakout #1)	2017	Tropikal Records Inc.
