= Oligochaeta (plant) =

Scientific classification
- Kingdom: Plantae
- Clade: Embryophytes
- Clade: Tracheophytes
- Clade: Angiosperms
- Clade: Eudicots
- Clade: Asterids
- Order: Asterales
- Family: Asteraceae
- Subfamily: Carduoideae
- Tribe: Cardueae
- Subtribe: Centaureinae
- Genus: Oligochaeta (DC.) K.Koch

Synonyms
- Serratula sect. Oligochaeta DC.

Genus of flowering plants

Oligochaeta is a genus of Asian flowering plants in the tribe Cardueae within the family Asteraceae.

Oligochaeta is native to central, southern, and southwestern Asia. They are annual plants that grow in mountain and steppe habitat.

It is part of the "Rhaponticum group" in the tribe Cardueae, along with the genera Callicephalus, Leuzea (including Acroptilon and Rhaponticum), Myopordon, and Ochrocephala. It can be distinguished from other genera by its pollen.

Species

- Oligochaeta divaricata - Caucasus, Iran, Iraq, Syria, Turkey
- Oligochaeta minima - Xinjiang, Kazakhstan, Turkmenistan, Uzbekistan, Iran, Afghanistan
- Oligochaeta ramosa - Indian subcontinent
- Oligochaeta tomentosa - Caucasus, Iran

formerly included

Oligochaeta leucosmerinx Rech.f. & Köie - Schischkinia albispina (Bunge) Iljin
