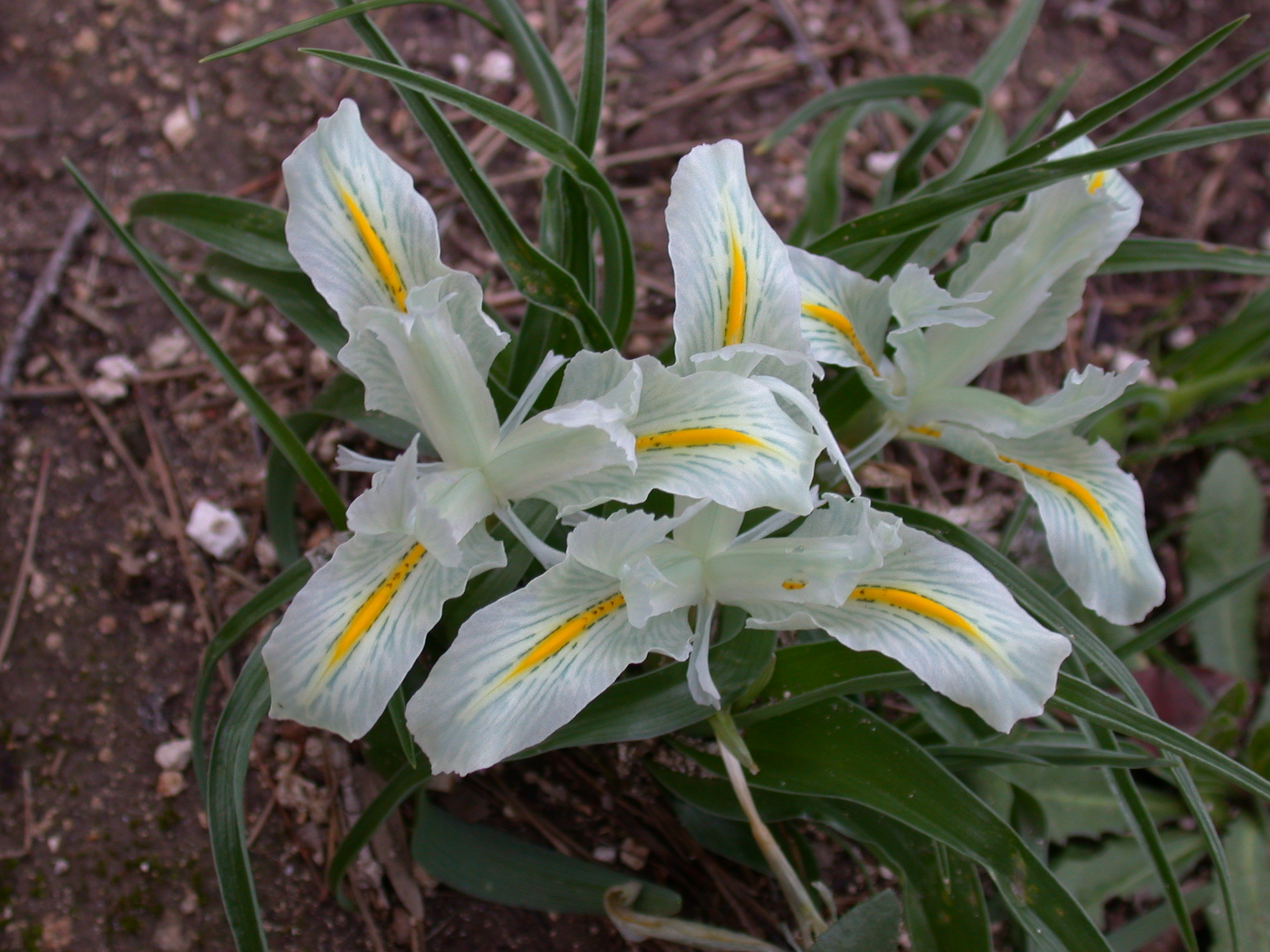

Conservation status
- Least Concern (IUCN 3.1)

Scientific classification
- Kingdom: Plantae
- Clade: Embryophytes
- Clade: Tracheophytes
- Clade: Angiosperms
- Clade: Monocots
- Order: Asparagales
- Family: Iridaceae
- Genus: Iris
- Subgenus: Iris subg. Scorpiris
- Section: Iris sect. Scorpiris
- Species: I. palaestina

Binomial name
- Iris palaestina (Baker) Barbey

Synonyms
- Iris planifolia subsp. palaestina (Baker) Bolt.; Juno palaestina (Baker) Klatt; Thelysia palaestina (Baker) Mattei; Xiphion palaestinum Baker

= Iris palaestina =

Species of flowering plant

Iris palaestina (sometimes Iris palestina) is a species in the genus Iris belonging to the subgenus Scorpiris. It is a bulbous perennial from Asia, including the Palestine region (Israel, Palestine and Jordan), Lebanon, and Syria. It has long, narrow, strap-like leaves, and a short stem. The early blooming, fragrant flowers are greenish-grey/white or yellow-white.

It is also known as the Palestine iris, and it is known in Hebrew as איריס ארץ-ישראלי (iris eretz israeli).

== Description ==
Iris palestina has 1–1.5 in (25–38 mm) ovoid brown bulbs.

Most specimens have up to six leaves, which are 6 in (150 mm) tall at flowering time. They are normally about 1–2 cm (0.39–0.79 in) wide at the base of the plant. The long, narrow, strap-like leaves have undulate edges with a thin white margin. They are normally shiny green in color, but are glossy on the upper surface. It has a short stem which is about 10–20 cm (3.9–7.9 in) high.

It has fragrant flowers between January and February. Generally, there are one to three flowers per stem. The flowers are greenish-grey/white, but can be yellow-white as well. In southern Israel, some specimens have a slight blue tinge. The flowers have winged falls. It has a perianth tube around 8–18 cm (3.1–7.1 in) long.

It has oblong capsules and seeds without arils.

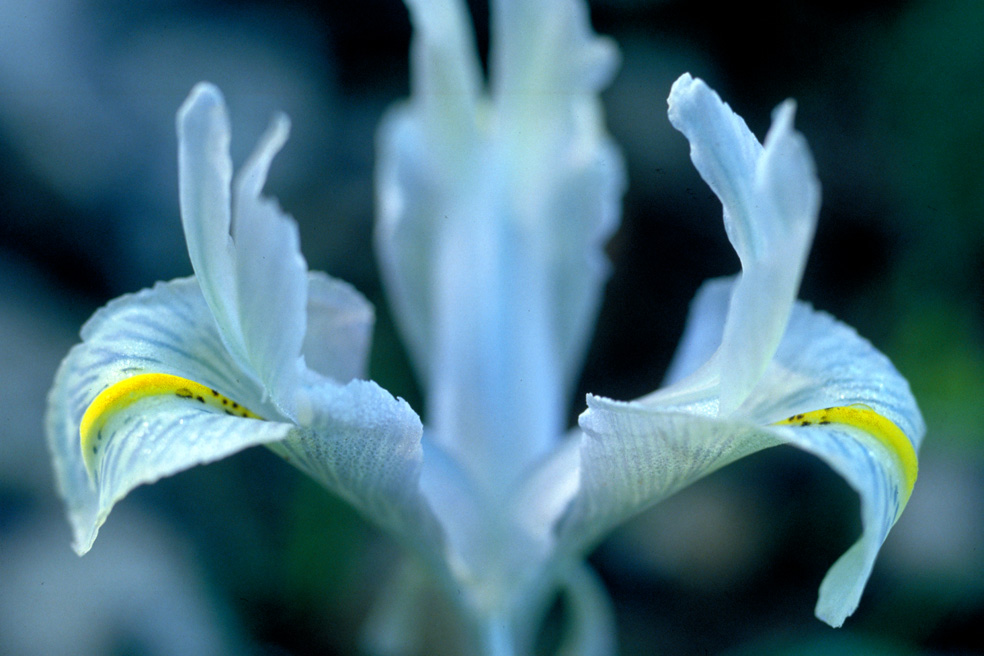
Iris palaestina near Jerusalem

== Taxonomy ==
The species was first described as Xiphion palaestinum by John Gilbert Baker in 1871. It was transferred to the now unrecognized genus Juno in 1972 as Juno palaestina. In 1882, it was given its present placement in Iris in a paper published by Caroline Barbey-Boissier and William Barbey, with the author of the combination Iris palestina being just William Barbey.

It was originally thought to be a variety of Iris vartanii. It is similar in form to the better-known and more decorative Iris planifolia. Indeed, in 2017, it was suggested to be a subspecies of Iris planifolia, I. planifolia subsp. palaestina.

Iris palaestina is a name accepted by the Royal Horticultural Society. It was verified by the United States Department of Agriculture and the Agricultural Research Service on 4 April 2003, and then updated on 1 December 2004.

== Distribution and habitat ==
Iris palestina is native to Syria, Lebanon, and the Palestine region (Israel, Palestine and Jordan). In Lebanon, its range includes Batha, and in Israel, it was found in Golan, Galilee, the Mediterranean coast, the northern valleys, Carmel, Samarian mountains, Samarian desert, Judean mountains, Sharon and Shefela.

It likes open stony soils (with sandstone material) at low altitudes. Normally it is found at coastal sites but is also common within olive groves.

== Cultivation ==
It is hardy to USDA Zone 4. In the UK, the iris is not hardy and is generally a poor grower. It is better grown in a pot under cover in a greenhouse or bulb frame. It should be potted in well-drained, fertile compost and should have a summer rest from watering.

It can be seen in Tel Aviv University Botanic Garden.

== Cultural uses ==
It has been used as a medicinal plant in the Middle East for urinary tract infections by boiling the leaves or the rhizomes in water, similar to the use of Iris pallida.

== Other sources ==
- Danin, A. (2004). Distribution Atlas of Plants in the Flora Palaestina Area: 404-410. Israel Academy of Sciences and Humanities.
- Feinbrun-Dothan, N. (1986). Flora Palaestina 4: 112-137. Israel Academy of Sciences and Humanities.
- Innes, C. (1985). The World of Iridaceae: 1-407. Holly Gare International Ltd., Ashington.
- Post, G.E. (1933). Fl. Syria, Palestine & Sinai 2: 583-604. American Press, Beirut.
