= Coleophora afghana =

Scientific classification
- Kingdom: Animalia
- Phylum: Arthropoda
- Class: Insecta
- Order: Lepidoptera
- Family: Coleophoridae
- Genus: Coleophora
- Species: C. afghana

Binomial name
- Coleophora afghana Toll & Amsel, 1967

Species of moth

Coleophora afghana is a moth of the family Coleophoridae that can be found in Afghanistan, Turkmenistan and Uzbekistan.

The larvae feed on Acanthophyllum elatius and other Caryophyllaceae species. They create a silky and straight case. It reaches a length of 10–12 millimetres (0.39–0.47 in). Larvae can be found in June and (after diapause) again in April.
