= Coleophora dentatella =

Scientific classification
- Kingdom: Animalia
- Phylum: Arthropoda
- Class: Insecta
- Order: Lepidoptera
- Family: Coleophoridae
- Genus: Coleophora
- Species: C. dentatella

Binomial name
- Coleophora dentatella Toll & Amsel, 1967

Species of moth

Coleophora dentatella is a moth of the family Coleophoridae. It is found in southern Russia.

The larvae feed on Acanthophyllum elatius. Larvae can be found in June and (after diapause) again from April to the beginning of May.
