= Psychrogeton =

Scientific classification
- Kingdom: Plantae
- Clade: Embryophytes
- Clade: Tracheophytes
- Clade: Angiosperms
- Clade: Eudicots
- Clade: Asterids
- Order: Asterales
- Family: Asteraceae
- Subfamily: Asteroideae
- Tribe: Astereae
- Subtribe: Asterinae
- Genus: Psychrogeton; Boiss.

Synonyms
- Novopokrovskia Tzvelev

Genus of flowering plants

Psychrogeton is a genus of plants in the tribe Astereae within the family Asteraceae.

It is native to Iran, Central Asia, and Anatolia.

Species

- Psychrogeton aellenii
- Psychrogeton alexeenkoi
- Psychrogeton amorphoglossus
- Psychrogeton cabulicus
- Psychrogeton candidissimus
- Psychrogeton capusi
- Psychrogeton chionophilus
- Psychrogeton drabiformis
- Psychrogeton lumbricoides
- Psychrogeton nabidshonii
- Psychrogeton nigromontanus
- Psychrogeton olgae
- Psychrogeton persicus
- Psychrogeton pseudoerigeron
- Psychrogeton rotundifolius
- Psychrogeton shahrestanicus
- Psychrogeton sphaeroxylus
- Psychrogeton turkestanicus

formerly included

several species transferred to other genera: Erigeron Rhinactinidia
