= C4orf36 =

Identifiers
- Aliases: C4orf36, chromosome 4 open reading frame 36
- External IDs: MGI: 1921468; HomoloGene: 51637; GeneCards: C4orf36; OMA:C4orf36 - orthologs

Gene location (Human)
Chr.	Chromosome 4 (human)
Band	4q21.3	Start	86,876,205 bp
Band	4q21.3	End	86,892,422 bp

Gene location (Mouse)
Chr.	Chromosome 5 (mouse)
Band	5|5 E5	Start	103,795,905 bp
Band	5|5 E5	End	103,803,876 bp
RNA expression pattern
Bgee	Human / Mouse (ortholog); Top expressed in: testicle; right testis; left testis; gonad; mucosa of esophagus; stromal cell of endometrium; skin of abdomen; right lung; canal of the cervix; prefrontal cortex / Top expressed in: seminiferous tubule; spermatid; spermatocyte; zygote; embryo; embryo; morula; secondary oocyte; blastocyst; epiblast; More reference expression data
BioGPS	n/a
Orthologs
Species	Human	Mouse
Entrez	132989	74218
Ensembl	ENSG00000163633	ENSMUSG00000029320
UniProt	Q96KX1	Q9DAA3
RefSeq (mRNA)	NM_144645; NM_001369888; NM_001369889	NM_001163550; NM_028824
RefSeq (protein)	NP_653246; NP_001356817; NP_001356818	NP_001157022; NP_083100
Location (UCSC)	Chr 4: 86.88 – 86.89 Mb	Chr 5: 103.8 – 103.8 Mb
PubMed search
- Wikidata
View/Edit Human	View/Edit Mouse

C4orf36 (chromosome 4 open reading frame 36) is a protein that in humans is encoded by the c4orf36 gene.

== Gene ==
C4orf36 (also referred to as MGC26744, LOC132989, spostobu, fersnyby, and forsnyby) is located on chromosome 4 at band 4q21.3 on the minus strand. The gene is 21,052 base pairs long (chr4: 86,876,205-86,897,256) and contains 8 exons. Its gene neighborhood includes AFF1-AS1, RPL6P13, SLC10A6, LOC260422, and AFF1. No human paralogs for c4orf36 have been identified.

=== Expression ===
RNA-seq and microarray data indicate that the c4orf36 gene is most highly expressed in the placenta, thyroid, ovary, and skin. It is also expressed in the lungs during fetal development, most highly at 17 weeks into development.

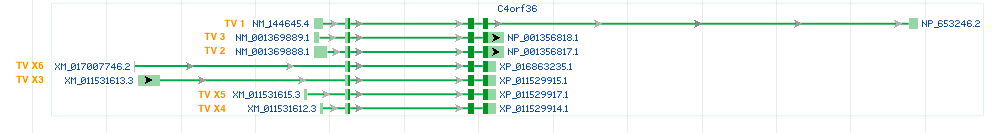

== Transcript ==
C4orf36 encodes 24 different mRNA transcripts, including 20 alternatively spliced variants and 4 unspliced forms. The transcript variant 1 (NM_144645.4), the subject of this article, is 908 nucleotides long and contains 5 exons. The promoter for transcript variant 1 (GXP_263623) spans the base pairs 86892213-86893422 on chromosome 4.

== Protein ==
C4orf36 encodes a 117 amino acid protein with a molecular weight of 13.28 kDa and an isoelectric point of 9.54. It contains a divalent cation tolerance protein CutA motif from amino acids 57-88. No transmembrane domains or N-terminal signal peptides have been identified for c4orf36. The protein is predicted to undergo several post-translational modifications, including myristoylation and phosphorylation.

Immunohistochemistry experiments have shown that the c4orf36 protein is localized to the cytosol and focal adhesion sites in the human U2-OS cell line, cultivated from the bone tissue of an osteosarcoma patient. Staining in human kidney tissue showed strong cytoplasmic and membranous expression within cells of tubules and moderate expression in glomeruli. Data from Human Protein Atlas also indicates that the protein is enriched in several regions of the brain, including the basal ganglia, cerebral cortex, pons, medulla, and in the hippocampus during its formation.

== Evolutionary history ==
C4orf36 orthologs are found in mammals and turtles. The gene is not found in other reptiles, birds, amphibians, fish, invertebrates, or outside of Kingdom Animalia. The gene likely first appeared around 318 million years ago, when mammals diverged from birds and reptiles.

The following table presents a diverse subset of c4orf36 orthologs found using BLAST searches. Within mammals, the sequence identity of the selected orthologs ranges from 99.1% to 47%. Within turtles, the sequence identity ranges from 34.8% to 32.2%.

Scientific Name	Common Name	NCBI Accession #	Protein Length (AA)	Sequence Identity to Humans (%)
Homo sapiens	Human	NP_653246.2	117	100.0
Pan troglodytes	Chimpanzee	PNI41451.1	113	99.1
Halichoerus grypus	Gray Seal	XP_035952662.1	117	75.2
Equus caballus	Horse	XP_023493530	117	75.2
Tursiops truncatus	Common bottlenose dolphin	XP_019782327.1	117	75.2
Manis pentadactyla	Chinese pangolin	XP_036752164.1	117	73.5
Choloepus didactylus	Southern two-toed sloth	XP_037684921.1	117	73.5
Galeopterus variegatus	Sunda flying lemur	XP_008566526.1	117	72.7
Bos Taurus	Cattle	XP_015327194.1	117	72.7
Vulpes Vulpes	Red fox	XP_025853915.1	117	68.4
Condylura cristata	Star-nosed mole	XP_004681481.1	117	67.5
Eptesicus fuscus	Big brown bat	XP_008141802.1	116	66.7
Mus musculus	Mouse	NP_001157022	117	64.1
Monodelphis domestica	Gray short-tailed opossum	XP_007495994	118	52.1
Ornithorhynchus anatinus	Platypus	XP_007658949.1	159	47.0
Trachemys scripta elegans	Slider turtle	XP_034628022.1	117	34.8
Chrysemys picta bellii	Painted turtle	XP_042712362	117	34.8
Dermochelys coriacea	Leatherback sea turtle	XP_038255787.1	117	33.9
Chelonia mydas	Green sea turtle	XP_043401238.1	117	33.0
Mauremys mutica	Yellow pond turtle	KAH1170002	117	32.2

C4orf36 is predicted to evolve more rapidly than other common human proteins, including cytochrome C and fibrinogen alpha.

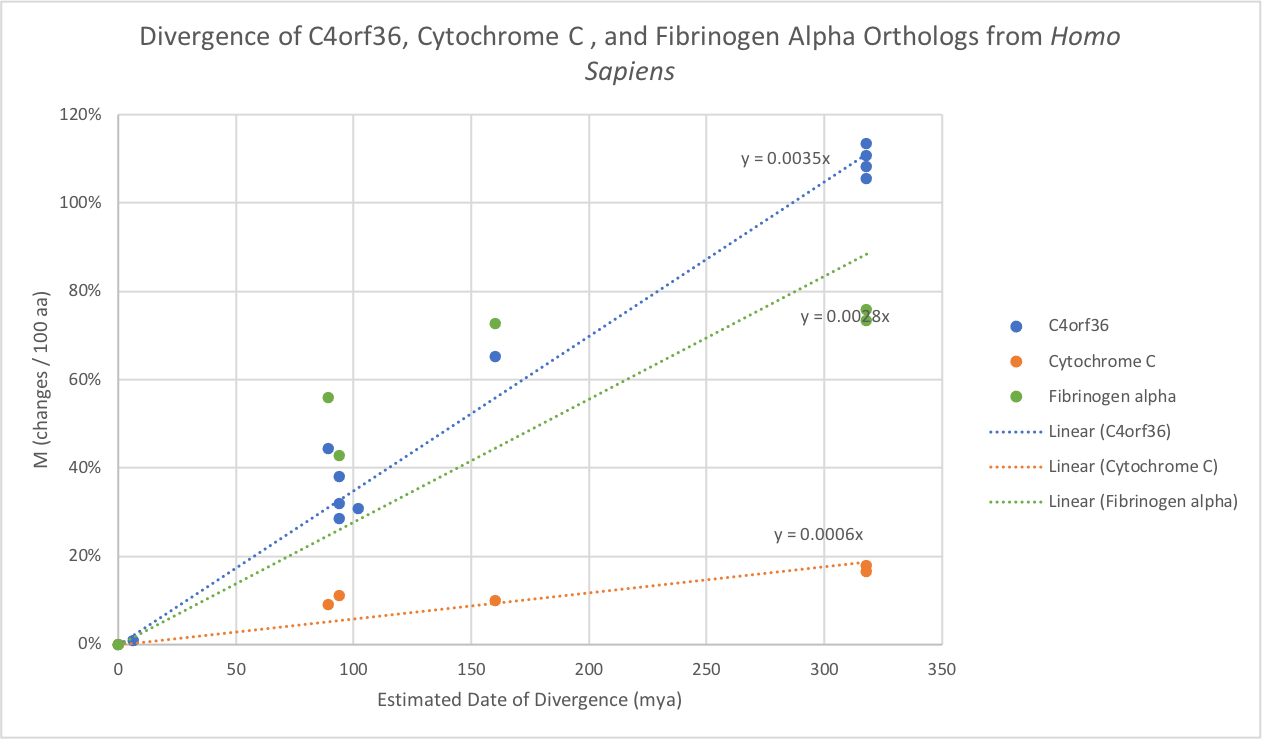

== Clinical significance ==
Immunostaining of c4orf36 in syncytiotrophoblast cells (STBs) of mid-gestation human embryos showed a dense punctate pattern consistent with that of c4orf36’s fungal protein analog, dynein light chain, which is involved in intracellular cargo transport and other cellular processes. In another study, ovarian cancer (OVCA) cell lines were treated with gemcitabine. Higher c4orf36 expression was associated with in vitro chemoresistance to the drug, indicating that increased c4orf36 expression may be related to decreased OCVA patient survival. Furthermore, microarray data suggests that C4orf36 expression levels are higher in the saliva of pre-treatment pancreatic cancer patients than that of healthy controls.

In one study on adaptogenic plants, neuroglia cell lines were treated with Rhaponticum carthamoides (RC), which promotes non-specific stress resistance and may mitigate the onset of senescence. C4orf36 was significantly deregulated in neuroglia cell lines after RC treatment, indicating that tighter c4orf36 regulation may play a role in the development of age-related disorders. A study on chondrogenesis found that c4orf36 has an oscillatory expression pattern coupled to that of ATP, indicating a potential link to skeletal development during embryogenesis.

=== Mutations ===
Chemically significant amino acid changes in conserved regions of the c4orf36 protein were found with NCBI SNPGeneView.

dbSNP rs# Cluster ID	Mutation	Function
rs149531474	M1T	No protein
rs1200223723	P70L	Missense
rs201168053	E78*	Nonsense
rs908052987	L86P	Missense
rs762808044	P113R	Missense
