= Trigonosciadium brachytaenium =

Scientific classification
- Kingdom: Plantae
- Clade: Embryophytes
- Clade: Tracheophytes
- Clade: Spermatophytes
- Clade: Angiosperms
- Clade: Eudicots
- Clade: Asterids
- Order: Apiales
- Family: Apiaceae
- Genus: Trigonosciadium
- Species: T. brachytaenium

Binomial name
- Trigonosciadium brachytaenium (Boiss.) R.Alava

Synonyms
- Malabaila brachytaenia Boiss. Pastinaca brachytaenia (Boiss.) Koso-Pol. Peucedanum brachytaenium (Boiss.) M.Hiroe

Species of flowering plant

Trigonosciadium brachytaenium is a species of flowering plant in the Apiaceae family. It is endemic to Iran. It is commonly called golparak (گلپرک in Persian).

== Sources ==
- Muẓaffariyān, Valī Allāh. 1996. Farhang-i nāmhā-yi giyāhān-i Īrān: Lātīnī, Inglīsī, Fārsī. Tihrān: Farhang-i Muʻāṣir.
