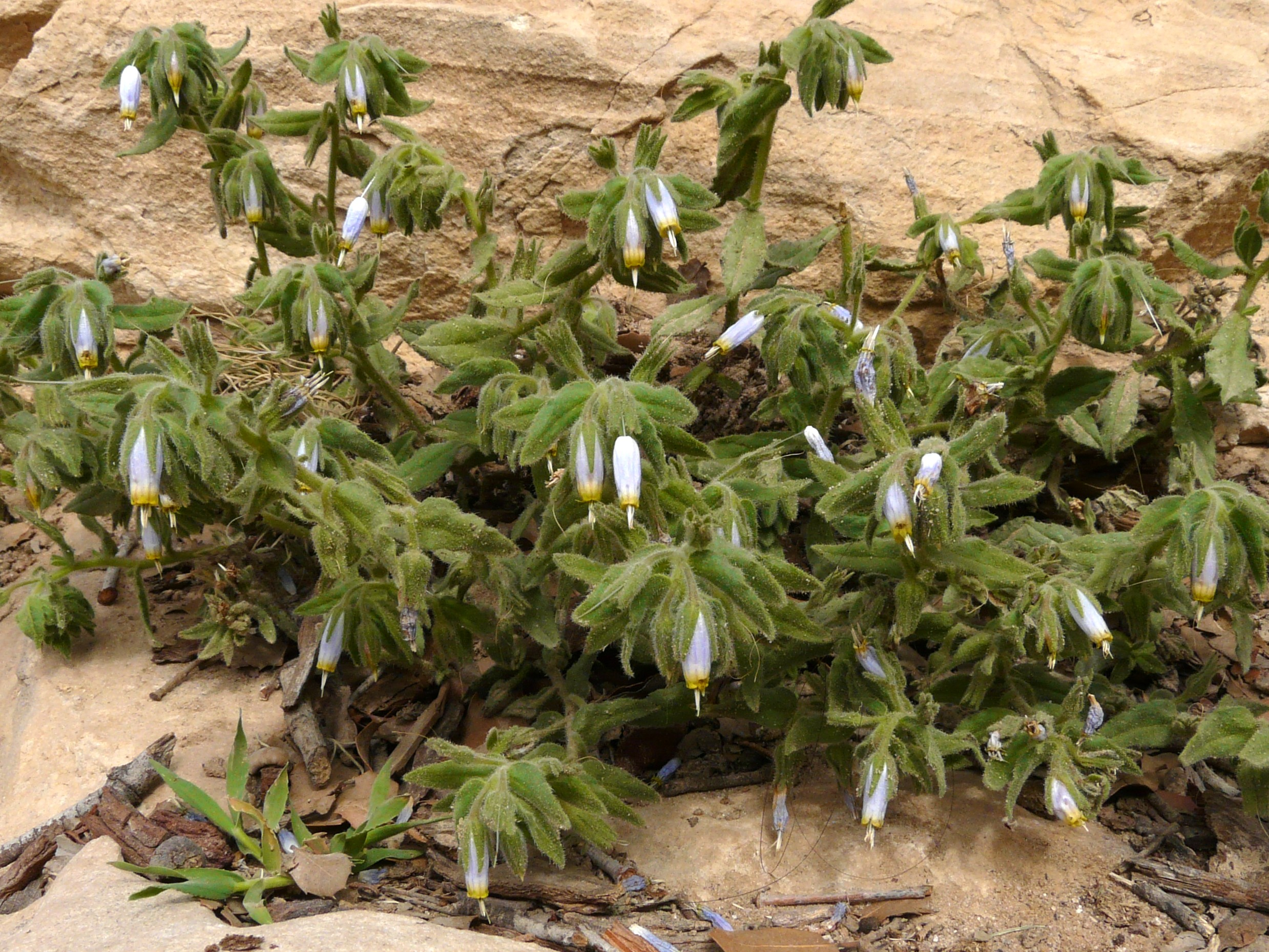

Scientific classification
- Kingdom: Plantae
- Clade: Tracheophytes
- Clade: Angiosperms
- Clade: Eudicots
- Clade: Asterids
- Order: Boraginales
- Family: Boraginaceae
- Genus: Podonosma
- Species: P. orientalis

Binomial name
- Podonosma orientalis (L.) Feinbrun

Synonyms
- Podonosma syriacum (Labill.) Boiss.; Onosmo orientalis (L.) L.; Arnebia orientalis (L.) Lipsky; Cerinthe orientalis (L.); Onosma orientalis var. amani (Riedl); Onosma orientalis var. palmyrena (Mouterde ex Charpin & Greuter); Onosma syriaca (Labill.); Podonosma orientalis var. amani (Riedl) L.Cecchi & Hilger; Podonosma orientalis var. palmyrena (Mouterde ex Charpin & Greuter) L.Cecchi & Hilger

= Podonosma orientalis =

Golden drop

Species of flowering plant

Podonosma orientalis, commonly known as golden drop, is a species of flowering plant resembling a low-lying shrub of the Boraginaceae family, first described by Carl Linnaeus. It is endemic to Turkey, the Eastern Mediterranean, namely, Syria, Lebanon, Israel (Palestine), and stretching as far as the woodlands and desert steppes of Jordan, Iraq, and in Western and Southern Iran. In Israel it is a regular feature in the Judean and Samaritan deserts, as also on Mount Carmel, where it is very common.

== Description ==
The simple leaves and stems of plant are entirely covered in green or whitish hairs, and sheds its foliage between August and October. Yellow to white and light blue flowers of a corolla-cylindrical shape appear on the plant's stalk between February and June.

In Arabic, the species of plant is known by the name maṣīṣ (Arabic: مصيص), whence its Hebrew name is also derived.

== Habitat ==
Golden drop is a subshrub (chamaephyte) that flourishes on vertical and sloping hard rock outcrops, especially on limestone rocks in garrigue terrain. In Wadi Khureitun (Judea), it grows in small vertical cracks and holes alongside Sonchus suberosus and Centaurea eryngioides, while in Wadi Qelt (Judea) it is found growing along the narrowest part of the chasm. In Jordan, it is found in Wadi Zerka Main (Moab) on the hard limestone, and grows also in the Nubian Sandstone gorge at Petra in Transjordan.

== Uses ==
The plant contains saponin, a chemical substance which produces a soapy lather. Arabs in Palestine would break off leaves and stems from the plant and form them into a wad for scouring pots and pans, or for burnishing copperware or silverware.

In Arab folk-medicine, macerated leaves of the plant, mixed with wheat flour, were placed on a heated compress and applied to the head in order to relieve migraine headaches.

The plant's flowers are edible.
