= Aphanopleura zangelanica =

Conservation status
- Data Deficient (IUCN 3.1)

Scientific classification
- Kingdom: Plantae
- Clade: Tracheophytes
- Clade: Angiosperms
- Clade: Eudicots
- Clade: Asterids
- Order: Apiales
- Family: Apiaceae
- Genus: Aphanopleura
- Species: A. zangelanica

Binomial name
- Aphanopleura zangelanica Gogina & Matsenko

Species of flowering plant

Aphanopleura zangelanica, the Zangelanian aphanopleura, is a species in the family Apiaceae that is endemic to the Zəngilan district of Azerbaijan. It is only known from its type specimen collected in 1971.
