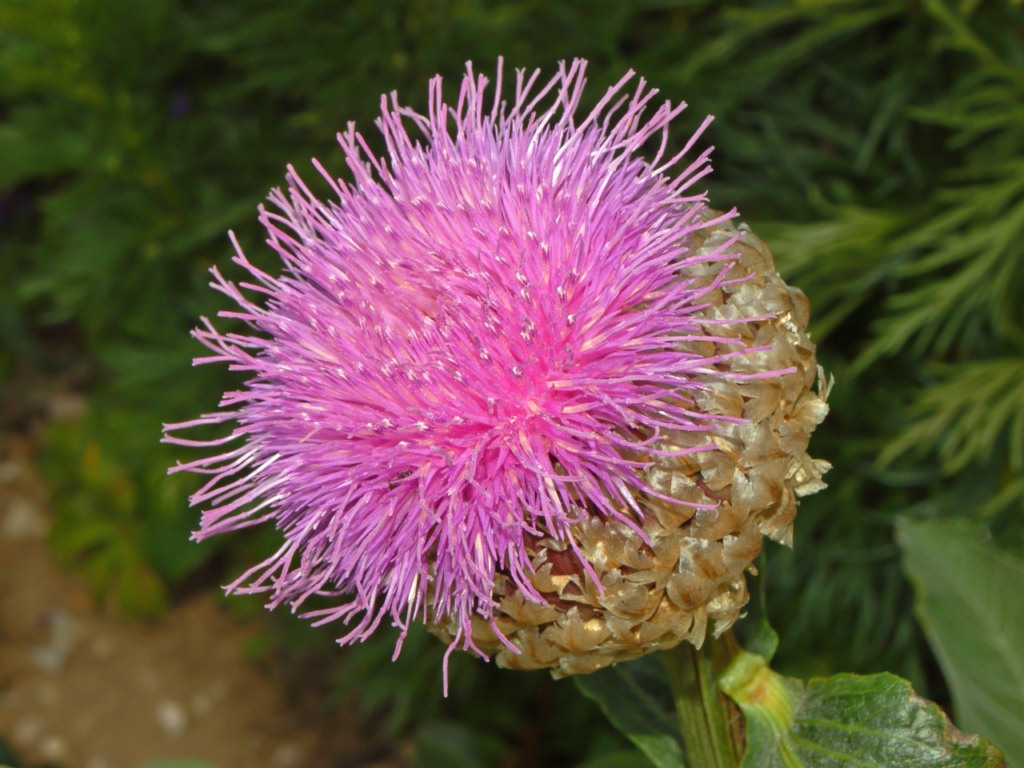
- Flower

Scientific classification
- Kingdom: Plantae
- Clade: Embryophytes
- Clade: Tracheophytes
- Clade: Spermatophytes
- Clade: Angiosperms
- Clade: Eudicots
- Clade: Asterids
- Order: Asterales
- Family: Asteraceae
- Genus: Rhaponticum
- Species: R. heleniifolium

Binomial name
- Rhaponticum heleniifolium Gren. & Godr.

Synonyms
- List: Centaurea heleniifolia (Gren. & Godr.) Fritsch; Centaurea lyrata Bellardi; Centaurea rhapontica subsp. heleniifolia (Gren. & Godr.) Arcang.; Leuzea heleniifolium (Gren. & Godr.) Holub; Rhaponticum lyratum (Bellardi) Bergmans; Rhaponticum scariosum proles heleniifolium (Gren. & Godr.) P.Fourn; Rhaponticum scariosum subsp. heleniifolium (Godr. & Gren.) Nyman; Stemmacantha heleniifolia (Godr. & Gren.) Dittrich

= Rhaponticum heleniifolium =

Species of flowering plant in the daisy family

Rhaponticum heleniifolium, synonym Leuzea heleniifolium, is a species of flowering plant in the family Asteraceae.

== Description ==
The biological form of Rhaponticum heleniifolium is hemicryptophyte scapose, as its overwintering buds are situated just below the soil surface and the floral axis is more or less erect with a few leaves.

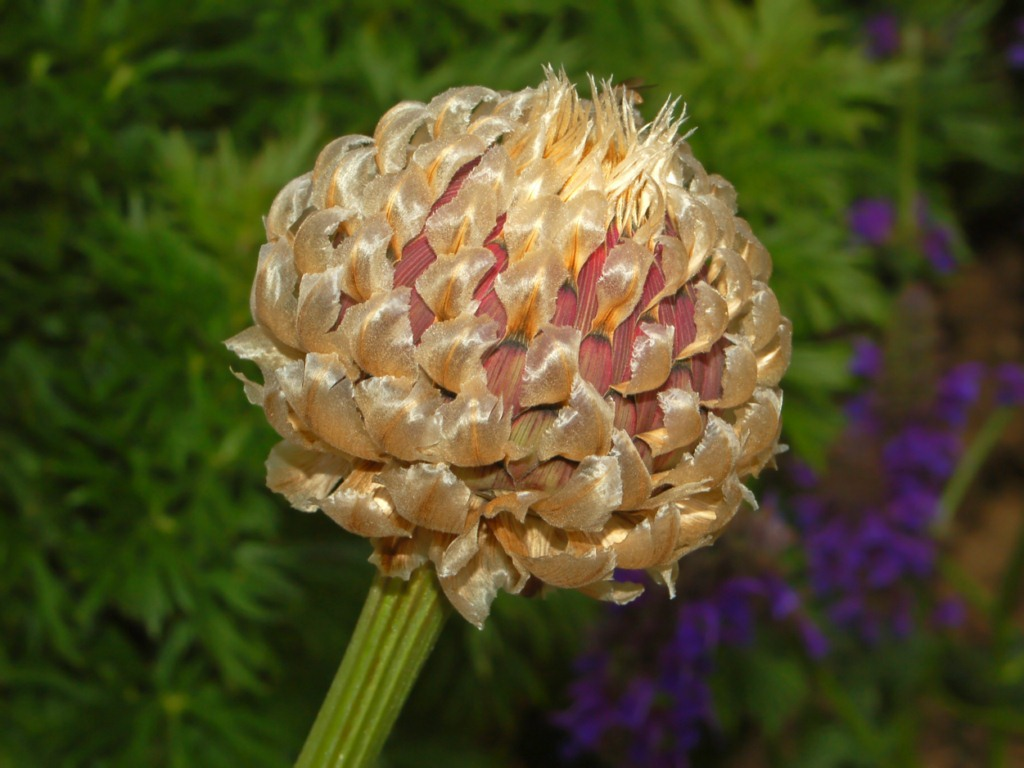
Scales with acute apex on a flower head

Rhaponticum heleniifolium reaches on average 50–150 centimetres (20–59 in) in height. The strong, thick, upright stem is quite leafy and hairy and usually has only one inflorescence. The leaves are green, while its underside is white-tomentose. Regarding the morphology of leaf blades, this species is quite polymorphic. The basal leaves are usually lanceolate or elliptical and petiolated. The flower heads are pink to purple, spherical and very large (about 6–10 centimetres (2.4–3.9 in) in diameter). The bracts are brownish and membranous. The flowering period extends from June to August. The flowers are hermaphroditic and are pollinated by insects. The fruits are brown achenes.

== Distribution and habitat ==
This quite rare plant occurs in Italy, France, Switzerland, and Austria.

Rhaponticum heleniifolium grows in western Alps in sub-alpine and alpine meadows and stony slopes. This plant prefers calcareous soils, at altitudes from 750 to 2,500 metres (2,460 to 8,200 ft).

== Gallery ==
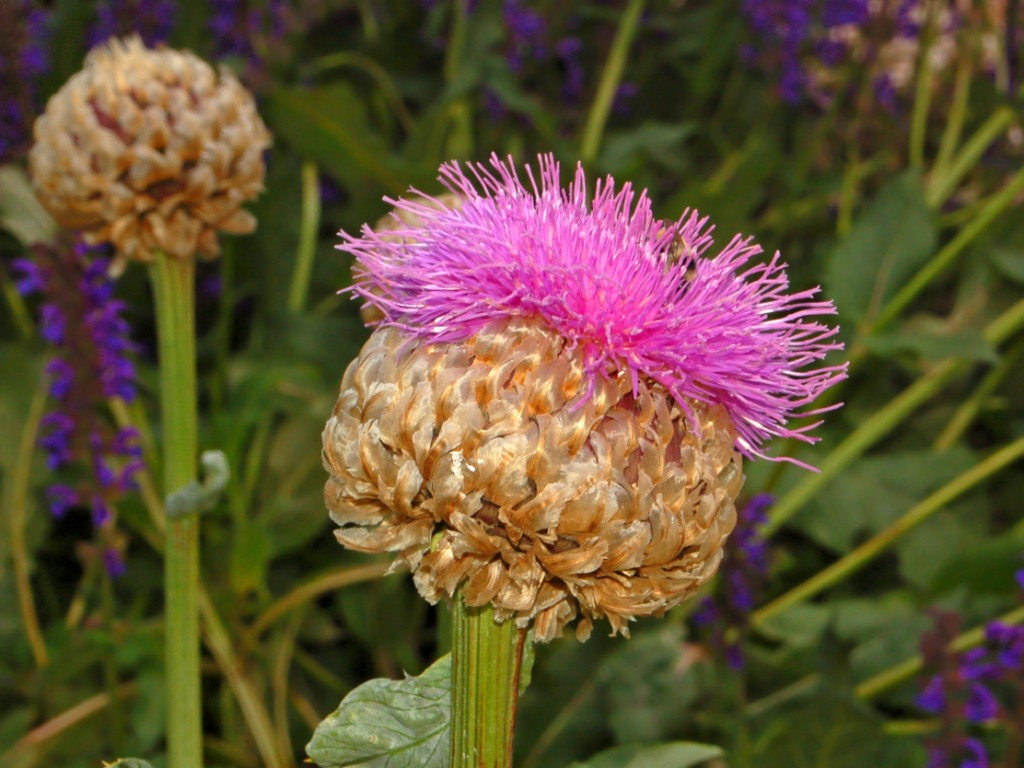
Plants

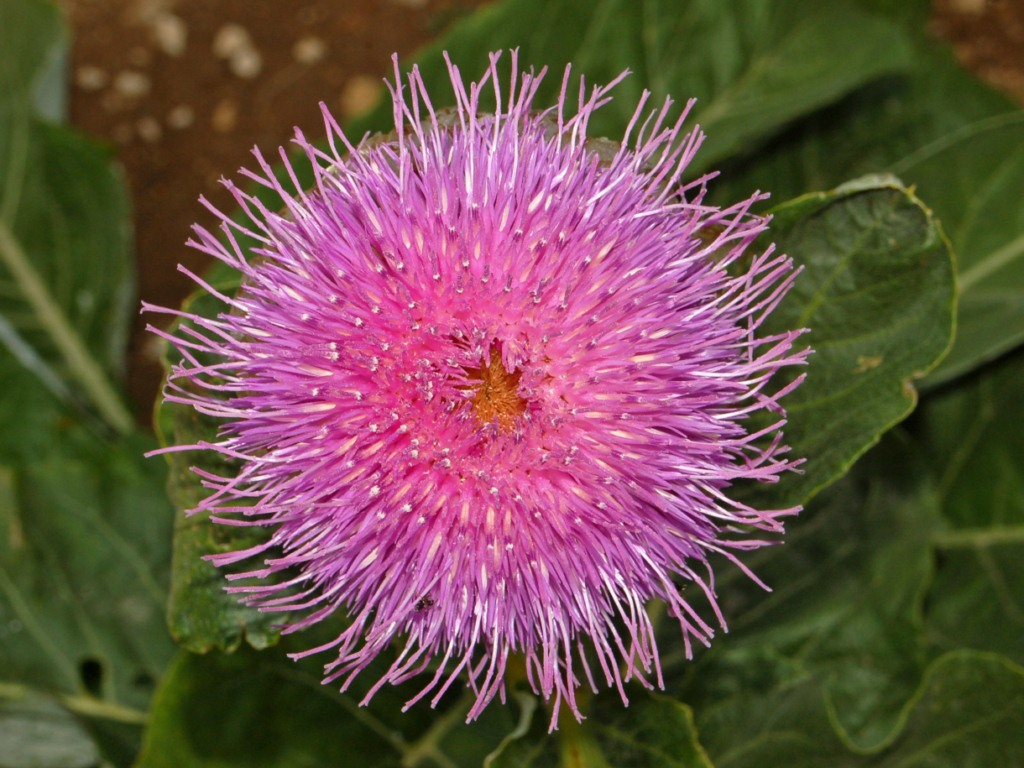
Flower

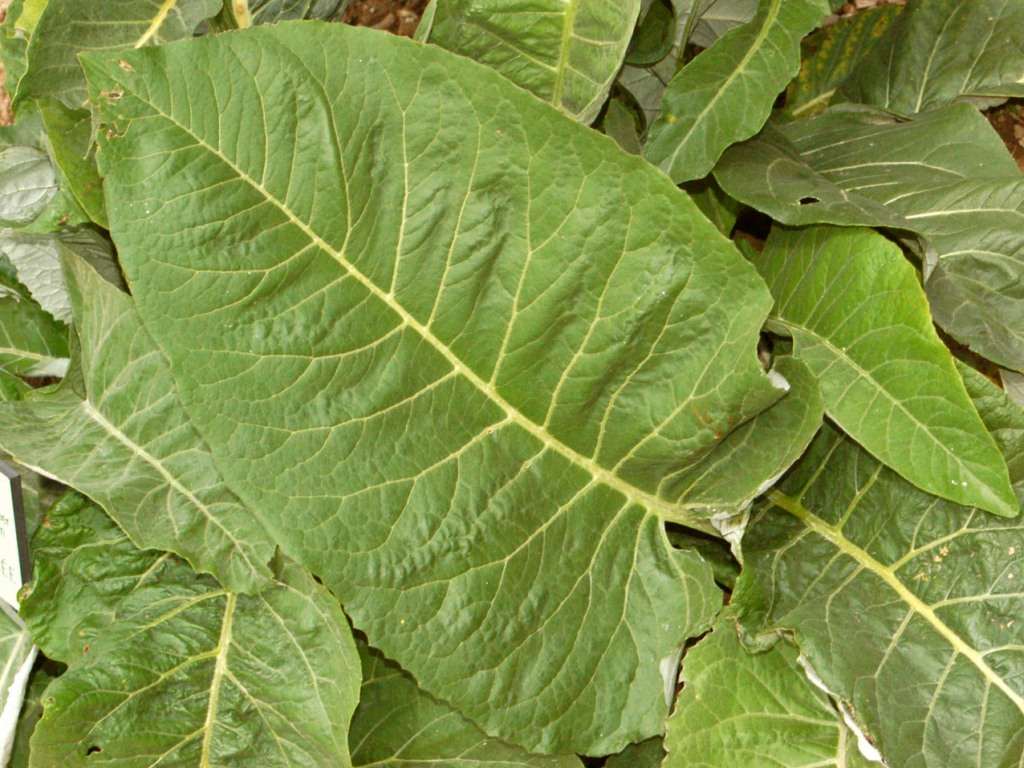
Leaves
