= Trigonosciadium =

Scientific classification
- Kingdom: Plantae
- Clade: Embryophytes
- Clade: Tracheophytes
- Clade: Spermatophytes
- Clade: Angiosperms
- Clade: Eudicots
- Clade: Asterids
- Order: Apiales
- Family: Apiaceae
- Subfamily: Apioideae
- Tribe: Tordylieae
- Subtribe: Tordyliinae
- Genus: Trigonosciadium; Boiss.

Species
- See text.

Synonyms
- Mandenovia Alava

Genus of flowering plants

Trigonosciadium is a genus in the family Apiaceae. Trigonosciadium brachytaenium is endemic to Iran, whereas T. tuberosum and T. viscidulum grow in Iran, Anatolia and Iraq.

== Species ==
Accepted species in the genus include:

- Trigonosciadium brachytaenium (Boiss.) Alava
- Trigonosciadium intermedium Freyn & Sint.
- Trigonosciadium komarovii (Manden.) Tamamsch.
- Trigonosciadium lasiocarpum (Boiss.) Alava
- Trigonosciadium tuberosum Boiss.
- Trigonosciadium viscidulum Boiss. & Hausskn.
