= Stenotaenia =

Scientific classification
- Kingdom: Plantae
- Clade: Embryophytes
- Clade: Tracheophytes
- Clade: Angiosperms
- Clade: Eudicots
- Clade: Asterids
- Order: Apiales
- Family: Apiaceae
- Genus: Stenotaenia; Boiss.

Species
- See text

Synonyms
- Pentataenium Tamamsch.

Genus of flowering plants

Stenotaenia is a genus of flowering plants in the family Apiaceae, native to Anatolia, the Transcaucasus, and Iran. Their fruit have numerous vittae on their dorsal and commissural surfaces, a trait shared with the genus Opopanax.

== Species ==
Currently accepted species include:

- Stenotaenia elbursensis Bornm.
- Stenotaenia haussknechtii Boiss.
- Stenotaenia macrocarpa Freyn & Sint.
- Stenotaenia nudicaulis Boiss.
- Stenotaenia tordylioides Boiss.
