= Acanthophyllum takhtajanii =

Conservation status
- Critically Endangered (IUCN 3.1)

Scientific classification
- Kingdom: Plantae
- Clade: Tracheophytes
- Clade: Angiosperms
- Clade: Eudicots
- Order: Caryophyllales
- Family: Caryophyllaceae
- Genus: Acanthophyllum
- Species: A. takhtajanii

Binomial name
- Acanthophyllum takhtajanii (Gabrieljan & Dittrich) A.Pirani & Rabeler

Synonyms
- Allochrusa takhtajanii Gabrieljan & Dittrich

Species of flowering plant

Acanthophyllum takhtajanii, or Takhtadjyan's allochrusa, is a species of flowering plant in the family Caryophyllaceae. It is endemic to Armenia, where it is only found in one location near Surenavan in the Urts Mountains in steppe at 800 m elevation. It is threatened by shifting agriculture and overgrazing.
