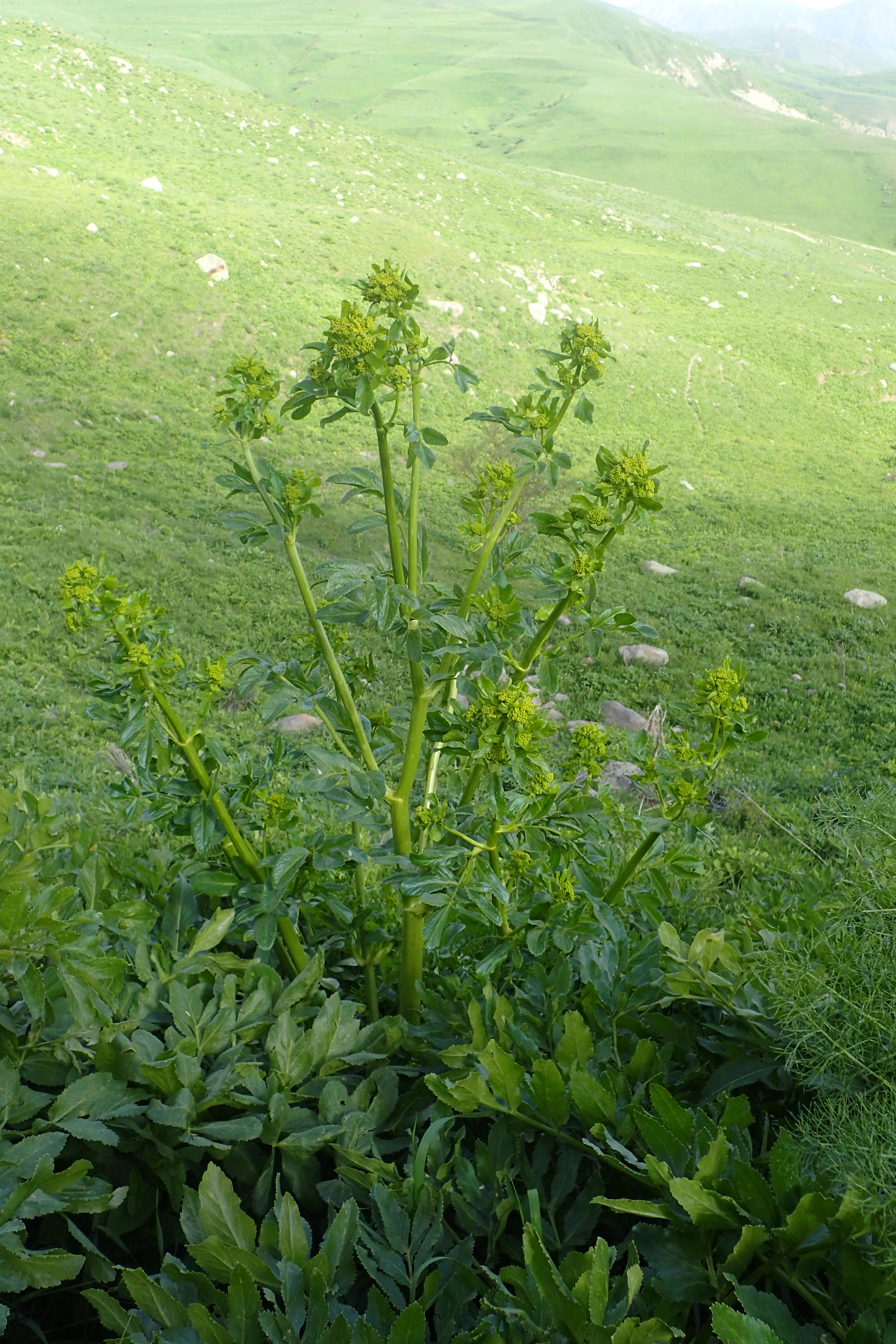
- Smyrniopsis aucheri

Scientific classification
- Kingdom: Plantae
- Clade: Tracheophytes
- Clade: Angiosperms
- Clade: Eudicots
- Clade: Asterids
- Order: Apiales
- Family: Apiaceae
- Subfamily: Apioideae
- Genus: Smyrniopsis; Boiss.

= Smyrniopsis =

Genus of plants

Smyrniopsis is a genus of flowering plants belonging to the family Apiaceae.

Its native range is Eastern Mediterranean to Iran.

== Species ==
Species:

- Smyrniopsis aucheri Boiss.
- Smyrniopsis syriaca Boiss.
