= Petroedmondia =

Scientific classification
- Kingdom: Plantae
- Clade: Tracheophytes
- Clade: Angiosperms
- Clade: Eudicots
- Clade: Asterids
- Order: Apiales
- Family: Apiaceae
- Subfamily: Apioideae
- Genus: Petroedmondia; Tamamsch.
- Species: P. syriaca

Binomial name
- Petroedmondia syriaca (Boiss.) Tamamsch.

Synonyms
- Colladonia syriaca Boiss.; Smyrniopsis cachroides Boiss.

Species of flowering plant

Petroedmondia is a monotypic genus of flowering plants belonging to the family Apiaceae. It only contains one known species, Petroedmondia syriaca.

It is native to Iran, Iraq, Lebanon, Palestine, Syria and Turkey.

The genus name of Petroedmondia is in honour of Pierre Edmond Boissier (1810–1885), a Swiss prominent botanist, explorer and mathematician. The Latin specific epithet of syriaca means "coming from the Syria. Both the genus and the species were first described and published in Fl. Iranica Vol.162 on page 167 in 1987.
