= Physoptychis =

Scientific classification
- Kingdom: Plantae
- Clade: Tracheophytes
- Clade: Angiosperms
- Clade: Eudicots
- Clade: Rosids
- Order: Brassicales
- Family: Brassicaceae
- Genus: Physoptychis; Boiss.

Genus of flowering plants

Physoptychis is a genus of flowering plants of the family Brassicaceae. It contains the following species:

- Physoptychis caspica (Hablitz) V.V. Botschantz.
- Physoptychis haussknechtii Bornm.
