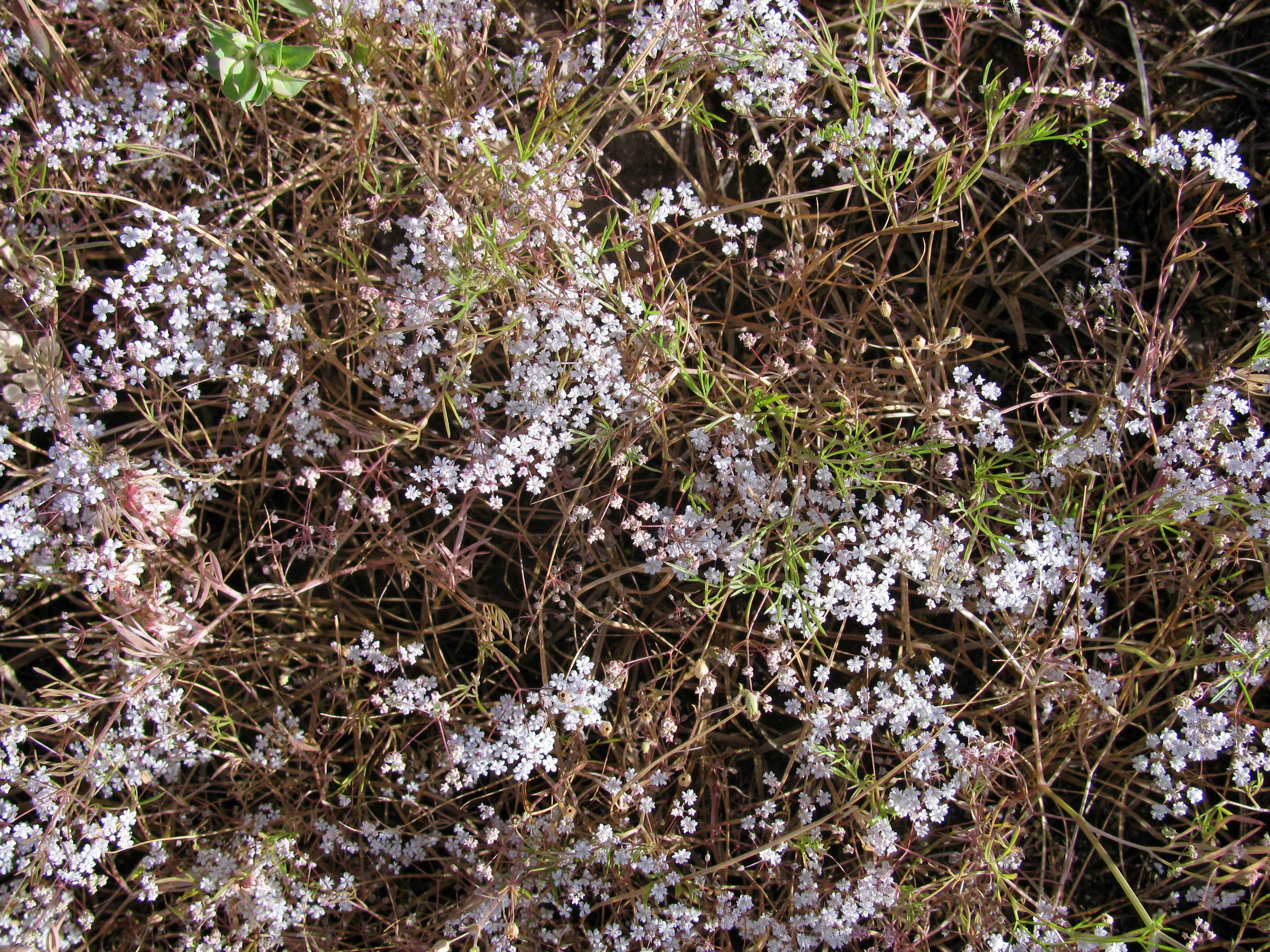

Scientific classification
- Kingdom: Plantae
- Clade: Embryophytes
- Clade: Tracheophytes
- Clade: Spermatophytes
- Clade: Angiosperms
- Clade: Eudicots
- Clade: Asterids
- Order: Apiales
- Family: Apiaceae
- Tribe: Pimpinelleae
- Genus: Aphanopleura; Boiss. (1872)

Species
- Aphanopleura breviseta (Boiss.) Heywood & Jury; Aphanopleura trachysperma Boiss.; Aphanopleura zangelanica Gogina & Matsenko

= Aphanopleura =

Genus of flowering plants

Aphanopleura is a genus of flowering plants in the family Apiaceae. It includes three species native to Iran and Transcaucasia.

== Species ==
Three species are accepted.

- Aphanopleura breviseta (Boiss.) Heywood & Jury
- Aphanopleura trachysperma Boiss.
- Aphanopleura zangelanica Gogina & Matsenko
