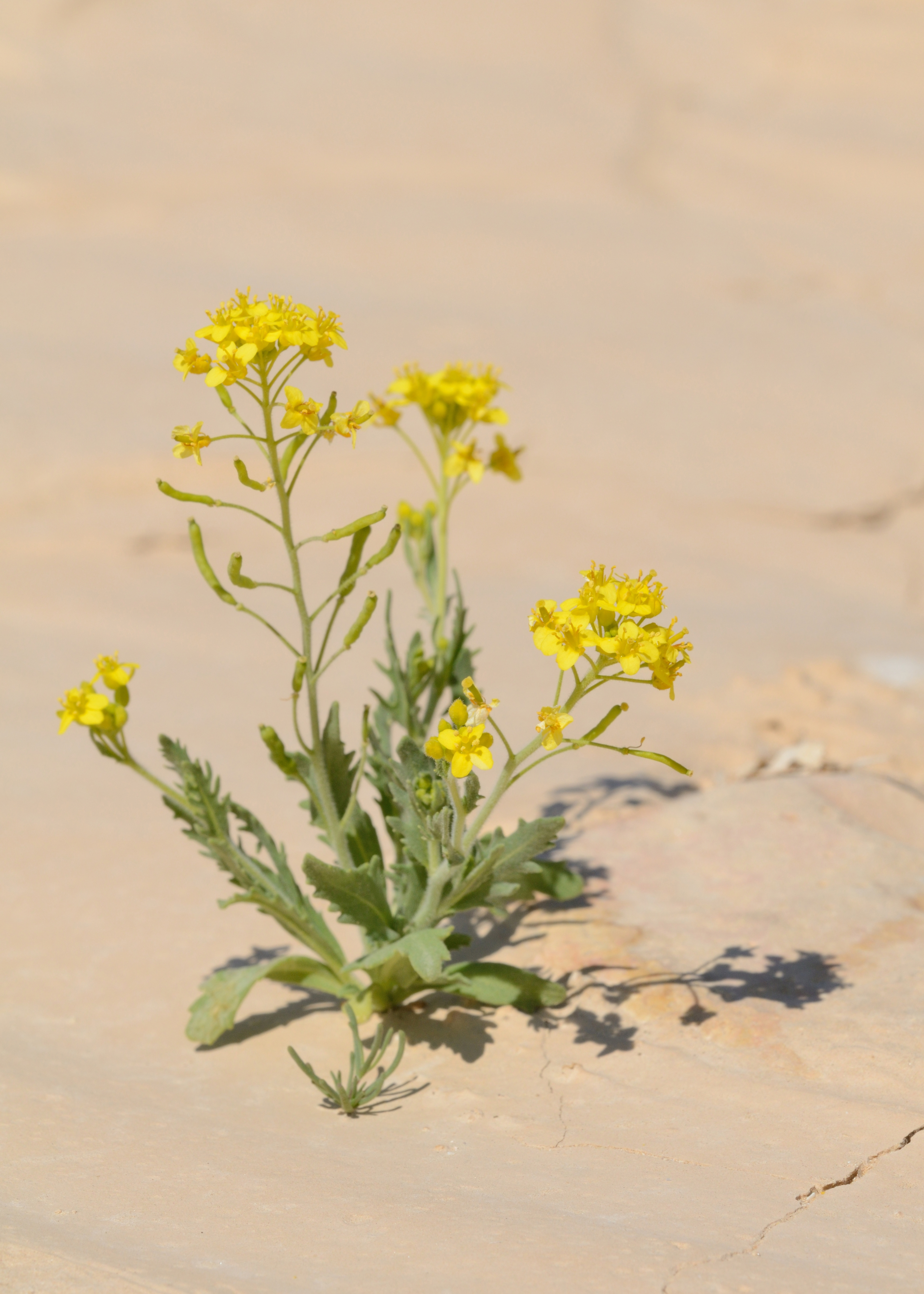
- Nasturtiopsis coronopifolia in Israel

Scientific classification
- Kingdom: Plantae
- Clade: Tracheophytes
- Clade: Angiosperms
- Clade: Eudicots
- Clade: Rosids
- Order: Brassicales
- Family: Brassicaceae
- Genus: Nasturtiopsis; Boiss.

= Nasturtiopsis =

Genus of plants

Nasturtiopsis is a genus of flowering plants belonging to the family Brassicaceae.

Its native range is the Southern and Eastern Mediterranean.

== Species ==
Species:

- Nasturtiopsis coronopifolia (Desf.) Boiss.
- Nasturtiopsis integrifolia (Boulos) Abdel Khalik & F.T.Bakker
