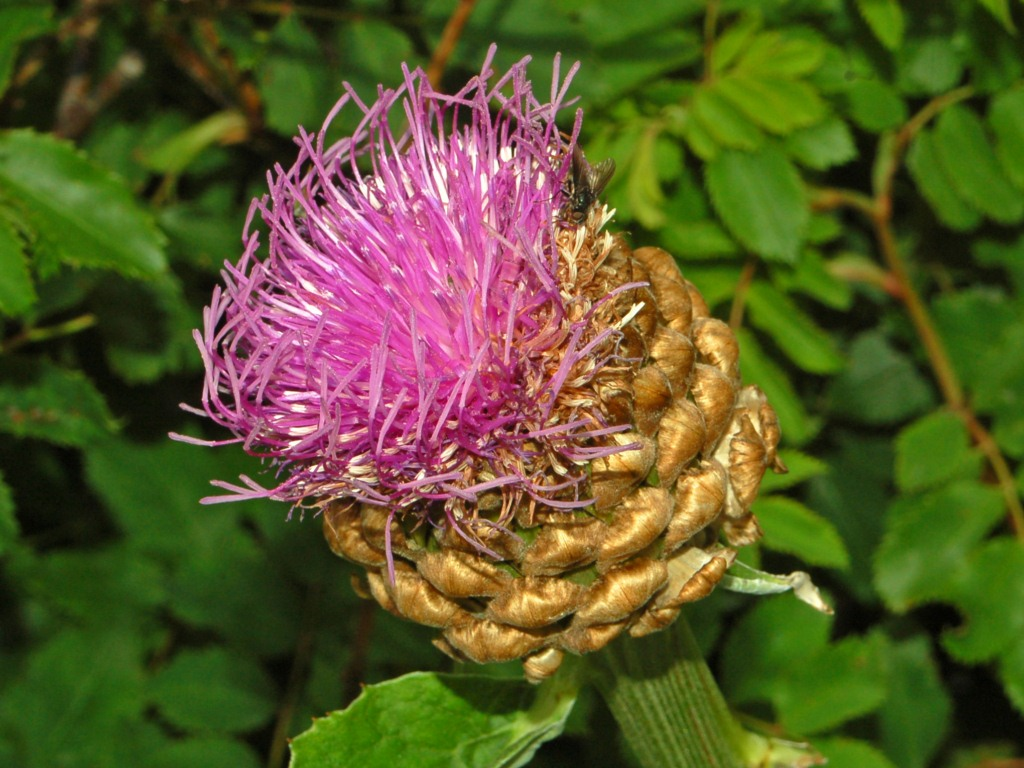
- Flower of Rhaponticum scariosum

Scientific classification
- Kingdom: Plantae
- Clade: Embryophytes
- Clade: Tracheophytes
- Clade: Angiosperms
- Clade: Eudicots
- Clade: Asterids
- Order: Asterales
- Family: Asteraceae
- Genus: Rhaponticum
- Species: R. scariosum

Binomial name
- Rhaponticum scariosum Lam.

= Rhaponticum scariosum =

Species of flowering plant in the daisy family

Rhaponticum scariosum, common name giant scabiosa, is a perennial herbaceous flowering plant of the genus Rhaponticum of the family Asteraceae.

== Description ==
The biological form of Rhaponticum scariosum is hemicryptophyte scapose, as its overwintering buds are situated just below the soil surface and the floral axis is more or less erect with a few leaves.

Rhaponticum scariosum reaches on average 30–150 centimetres (12–59 in) in height. The strong, thick, upright stem is leafy and hairy, woolly-tomentose and usually has only one inflorescence. The leaves are green, while its underside is white-tomentose, with irregularly toothed edges. The basal leaves are heart-shaped and petiolated, about 30–40 centimetres (12–16 in) long, the upper leaves are smaller, lanceolate, about 10–22 centimetres (3.9–8.7 in) long. The flower heads are pink to purple, spherical and very large (about 6–7 centimetres (2.4–2.8 in) in diameter). The bracts are brownish and scarious. The flowering period extends from June to August.The flowers are hermaphroditic and are pollinated by insects. The fruits are brown achenes.

== Distribution ==
This quite rare plant occurs in Italy, France, Switzerland, Austria and Slovenia.

== Habitat ==
It grows in sub-alpine and alpine meadows, stony slopes and thickets. This plant prefers slightly moist and mostly calcareous soils, at altitudes from 750 to 2,500 metres (750 to 2,500 m).

== Gallery ==
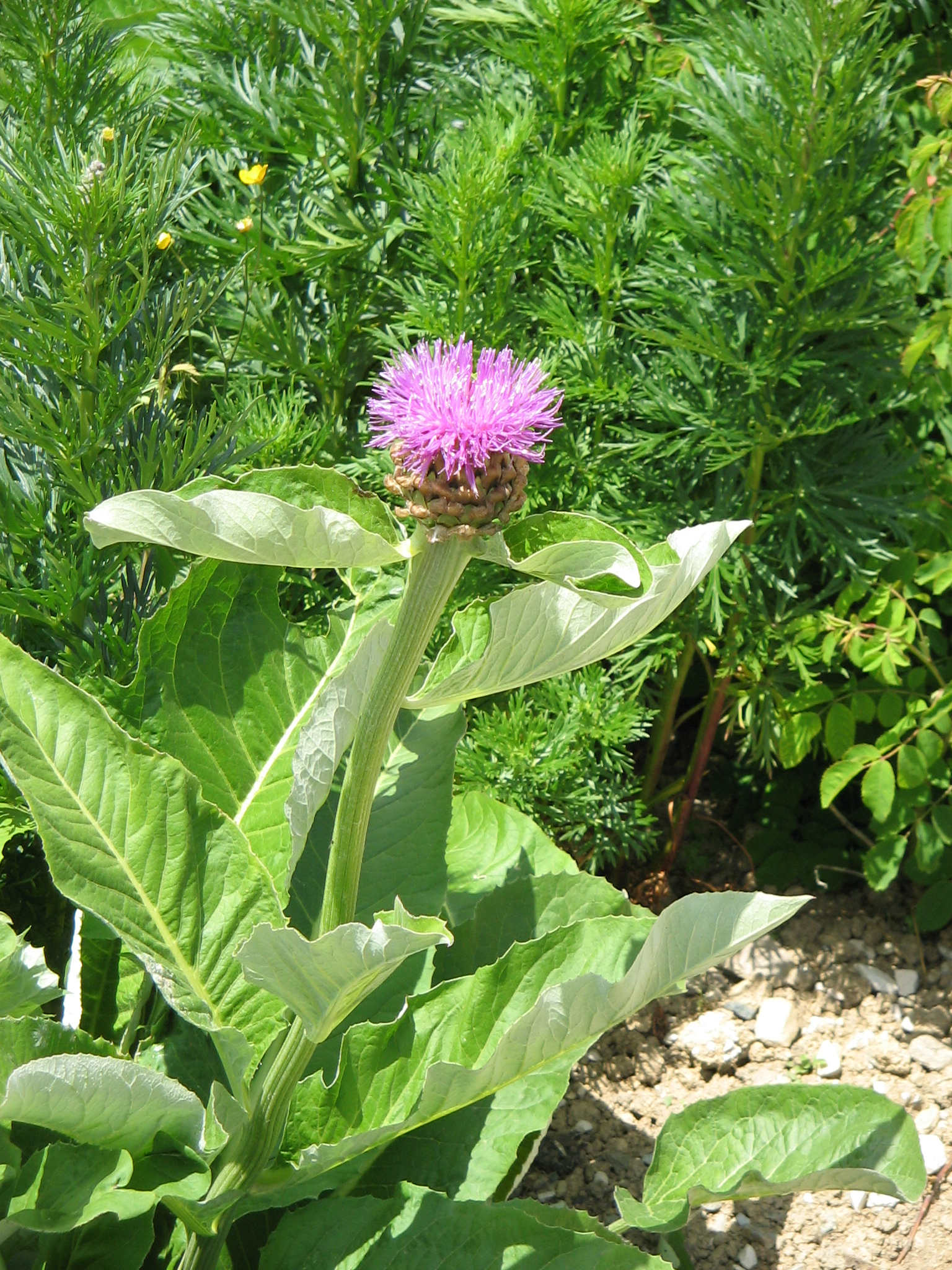
Plant of Rhaponticum scariosum

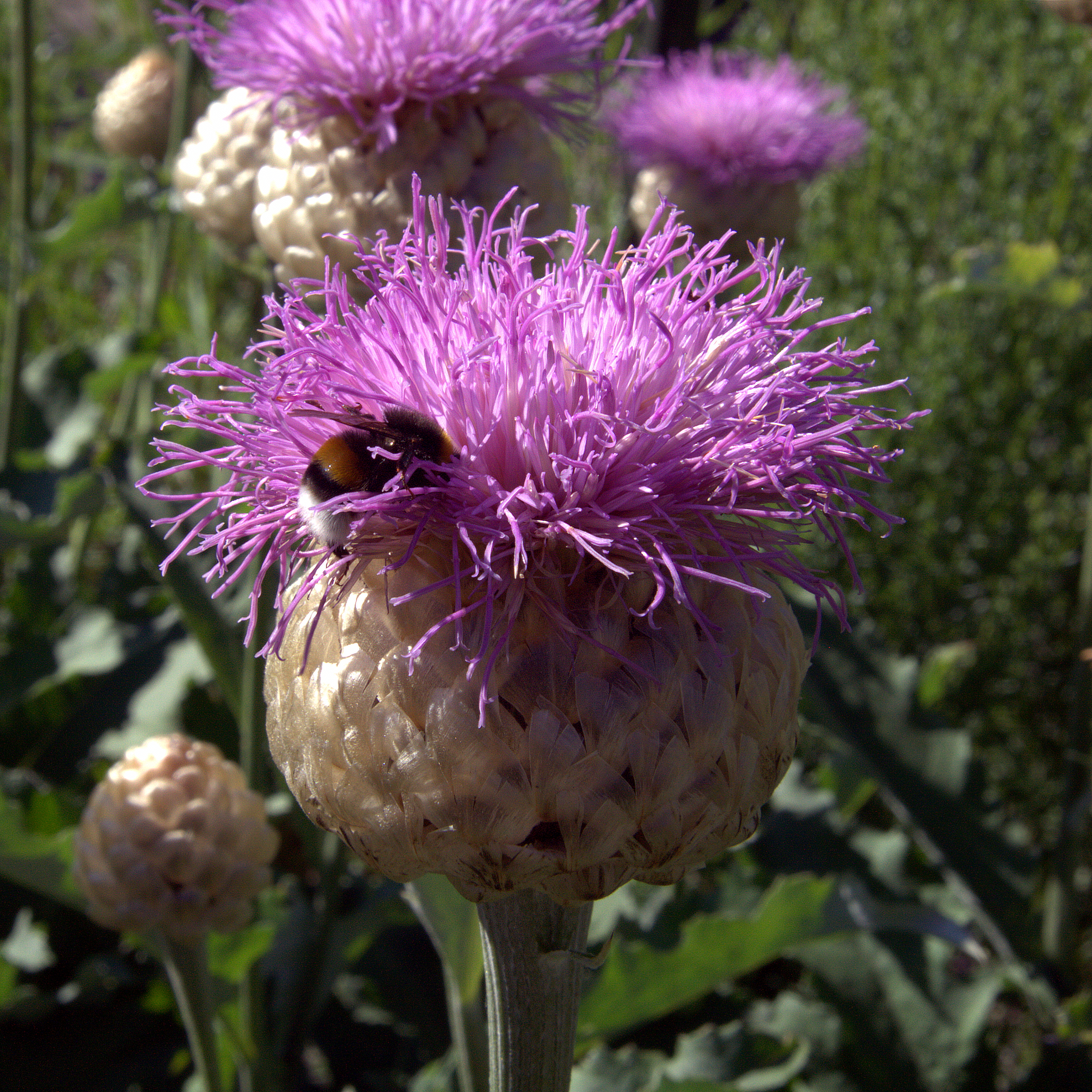
Rhaponticum scariosum ssp rhaponticum

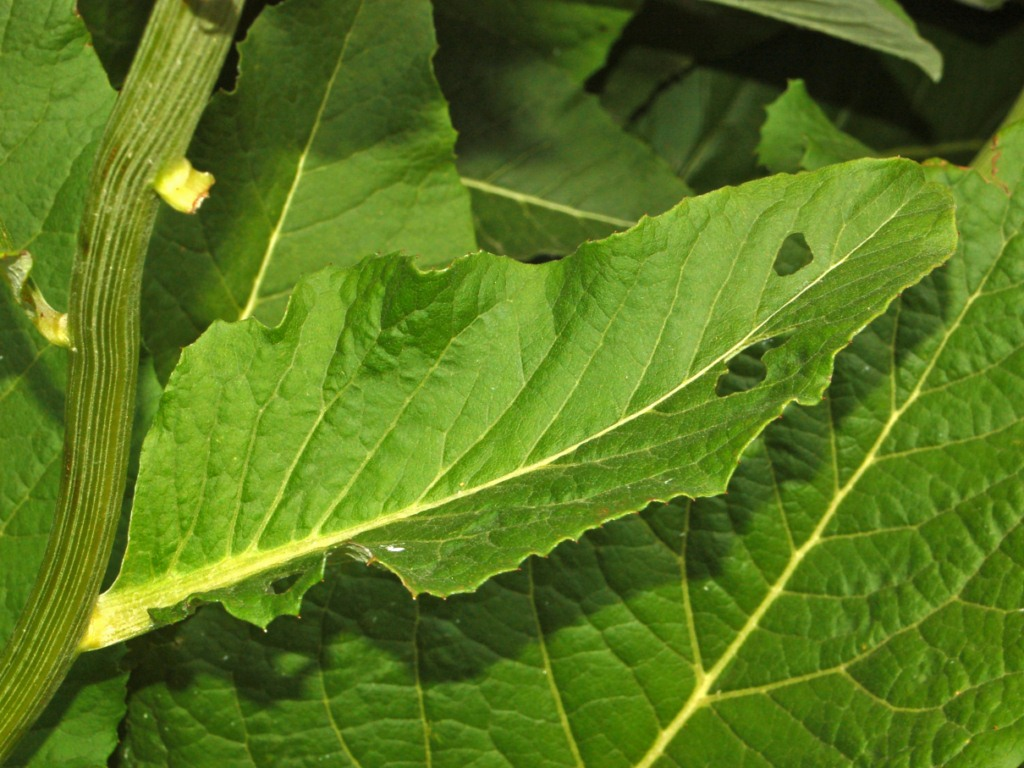
Leaves of Rhaponticum scariosum

== Synonyms ==
- Centaurea rhapontica L., Sp. Pl. 2: 915. 1753.
- Centaurea scariosa (Lam.) Rouy, Fl. France 9: 114. 1905.
- Leuzea rhapontica (L.) Holub, Folia Geobot. Phytotax. (Praha) 8:392. 1973.
- Rhapontica rhapontica Hill, Hort. Kew. 69. 1768, nom. illeg.
- Rhaponticum rhaponticum (L.) Voss, Vilm. Blumengärtn., ed. 3. 1: 554. 1894, nom. illeg.
- Serratula rhapontica (L.) DC., Fl. Franc. (Candolle & Lamarck), ed. 3. 4: 87. 1805.
- Stemmacantha rhapontica (L.) Dittrich, Candollea 39(1): 49. 1984.
- Rhaponticum scariosum subsp. lamarckii (Dittrich) Greuter, Willdenowia 33(1): 61. 2003.
- Stemmacantha rhapontica subsp. lamarckii Dittrich, Candollea 39: 49. 1984, nom. illeg.
