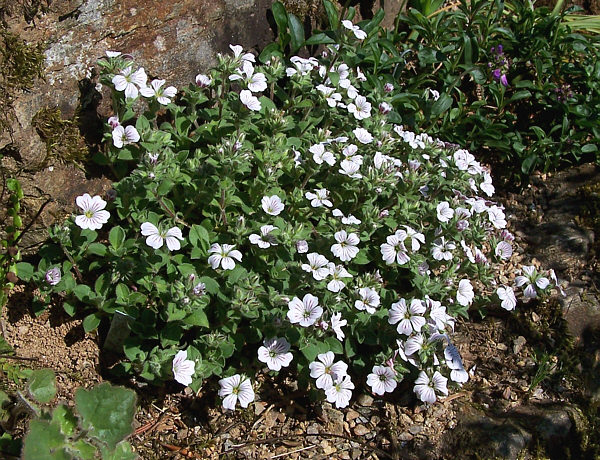

Scientific classification
- Kingdom: Plantae
- Clade: Tracheophytes
- Clade: Angiosperms
- Clade: Eudicots
- Order: Caryophyllales
- Family: Caryophyllaceae
- Genus: Acanthophyllum
- Species: A. cerastioides

Binomial name
- Acanthophyllum cerastioides (D.Don) Madhani & Zarre

Synonyms
- Gypsophila cerastioides D.Don

= Acanthophyllum cerastioides =

Chickweed baby's-breath

Species of flowering plant

Acanthophyllum cerastioides, the chickweed baby's-breath, is a perennial plant of the family Caryophyllaceae, found in Bangladesh, Bhutan, North India, Nepal, North Pakistan, and Sikkim, with a typical height of 10–27 cm. Recent molecular studies show this species is a member of the genus Acanthophyllum rather than Gypsophila.

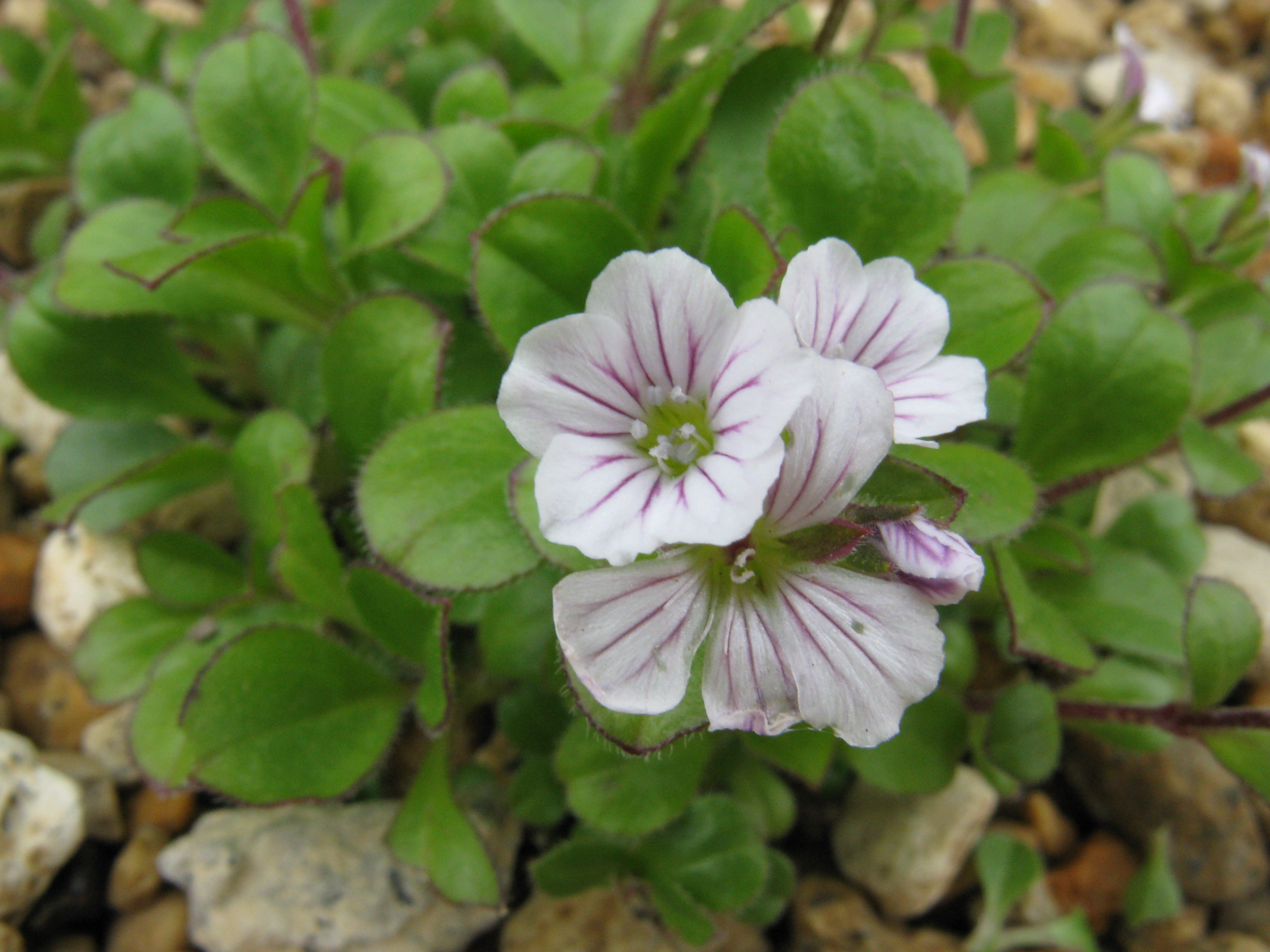
Flowers
