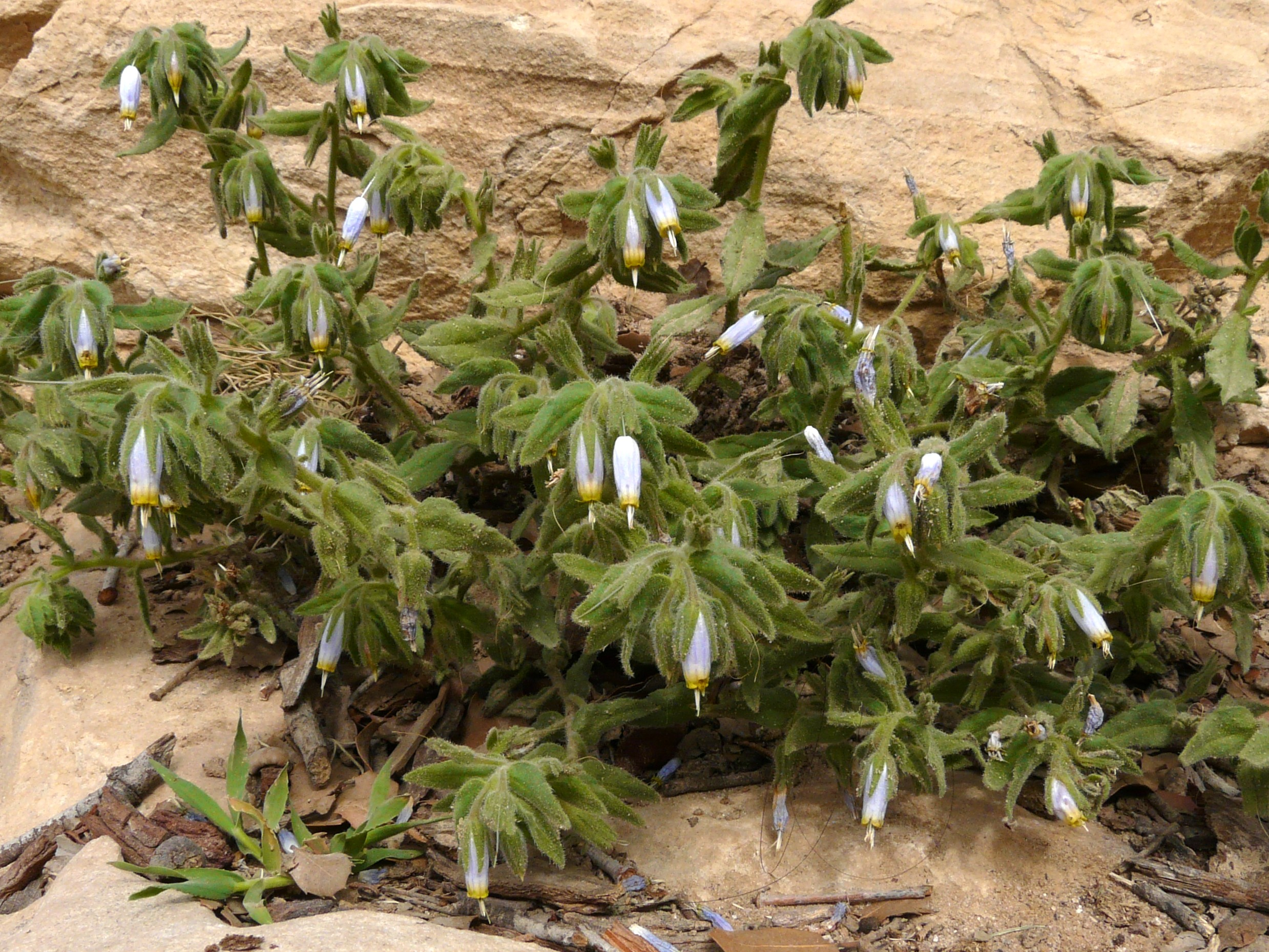
- Podonosma orientalis

Scientific classification
- Kingdom: Plantae
- Clade: Tracheophytes
- Clade: Angiosperms
- Clade: Eudicots
- Clade: Asterids
- Order: Boraginales
- Family: Boraginaceae
- Genus: Podonosma; Boiss. (1849)

Species
- 4; see text

= Podonosma =

Genus of plants

Podonosma is a genus of flowering plants belonging to the family Boraginaceae.

Its native range is Eastern Mediterranean to Iran.

== Species ==
Four species are accepted.

- Podonosma galalensis Schweinf. ex Boiss.
- Podonosma orientalis (L.) Feinbrun
- Podonosma sindjarensis (Riedl) L.Cecchi & Hilger
- Podonosma sintenisii Bornm.
