= Myopordon pulchellum =

Scientific classification
- Kingdom: Plantae
- Clade: Tracheophytes
- Clade: Angiosperms
- Clade: Eudicots
- Clade: Asterids
- Order: Asterales
- Family: Asteraceae
- Genus: Myopordon
- Species: M. pulchellum

Binomial name
- Myopordon pulchellum (C.Winkl. & Barbey) Wagenitz

Synonyms
- Autrania pulchella

Species of plant

Myopordon pulchellum (Arabic: مِيوبُرْدون ظَريف) is a species of flowering plants in the tribe Cardueae within the family Asteraceae.

== Description ==
The plant is sub-acaulescent with a single flowering head, it measures 3 to 5 centimetres (1.2 to 2.0 in). The briefly petiolated leaves are arranged in a rosette around a thick rhizome; the leaves form a sheath around the base. The leaves are appressed, pinnatifid or lyrate and the contour is ovate to lanceolate; both leave faces are canescent with ciliated and spiny margins. The pant's receptacle has silky trichomes. Involucral bracts are canescent and covered with cobweb-like hairs, each bract ends with a single spine. The fruit is a smooth rotund achene with lateral hilum measuring 5 millimetres (0.20 in) long and 1 millimetre (0.039 in) wide surmounted by a white pappus.

== Distribution ==
The plant is endemic to Lebanon.
