= Ducrosia =

Scientific classification
- Kingdom: Plantae
- Clade: Tracheophytes
- Clade: Angiosperms
- Clade: Eudicots
- Clade: Asterids
- Order: Apiales
- Family: Apiaceae
- Subfamily: Apioideae
- Tribe: Tordylieae
- Genus: Ducrosia; Boiss.

Synonyms
- Ducroisia Endl.

Genus of plants

Ducrosia is a genus of flowering plants belonging to the family Apiaceae.

Its native range was southern Egypt to Pakistan. The plants can be found in Afghanistan, the Gulf States, Iran, Iraq, Lebanon-Syria, Oman, Pakistan, Palestine, Saudi Arabia and Yemen.

1 species, Ducrosia ismaelis Asch. is now extinct in Egypt, but can be found in Saudi Arabia.

The genus name of Ducrosia is in honour of François-Barthélémy Ducros (1751–1822), Swiss clergyman, botanist in Nyon, Switzerland, and was a friend of Edmond Boissier who then described and published the genus in Ann. Sci. Nat., Bot., séries 3, Vol.1 on page 341 in 1844.

Known species:

- Ducrosia anethifolia (DC.) Boiss.
- Ducrosia areysiana (Deflers) Pimenov & Kljuykov
- Ducrosia assadii Alava
- Ducrosia flabellifolia Boiss.
- Ducrosia inaccessa (C.C.Towns.) Pimenov & Kljuykov
- Ducrosia ismaelis Asch.
