= Caroline Barbey-Boissier =

Swiss botanist (1847–1918)

Caroline Barbey-Boissier (née Boissier; 4 August 1847 – 18 January 1918) was a Swiss botanist, author and philanthropist.

== Life ==
Barbey-Boissier was born in Geneva on 4 August 1847, the daughter of botanist Pierre Edmond Boissier and Lucile Butini-de la Rive. After her mother's early death, she was raised by her aunt, Countess Valérie de Gasparin (née Boissier), whose biography she wrote. Barbey-Boissier collaborated in botanical works with her husband William Barbey, whom she married in 1869. She was active in Protestant philanthropic organizations such as l'Amie de la jeune fille ("Friend of the Young Woman"). Barbey-Boissier died in Pregny-Chambésy on 18 January 1918, aged 70.

== Written works ==
- Herborisations au Levant −1882 (in French), co-written with her husband William Barbey
- La comtesse Agénor de Gasparin et sa famille: Correspondance et souvenirs 1813–1894, Volume 1 – 1902 (in French)

The standard author abbreviation Barb.-Boiss. is used to indicate this person as the author when citing a botanical name.
