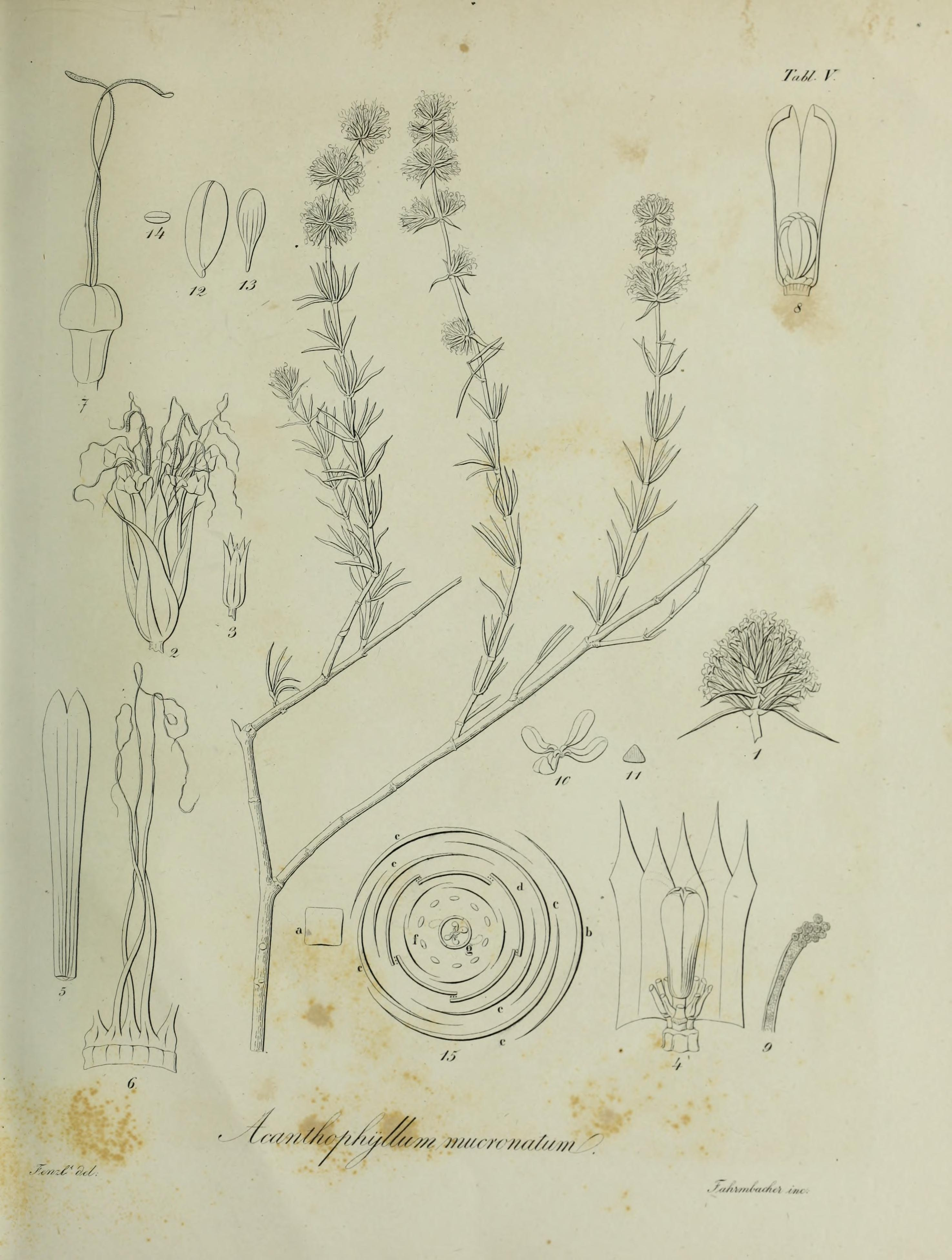
- Acanthophyllum mucronatum

Scientific classification
- Kingdom: Plantae
- Clade: Tracheophytes
- Clade: Angiosperms
- Clade: Eudicots
- Order: Caryophyllales
- Family: Caryophyllaceae
- Genus: Acanthophyllum; C.A.Mey.

Species
- See text

Synonyms
- Allochrusa Bunge ex Boiss.; Czeikia Ikonn.; Diaphanoptera Rech.f.; Kabulianthe (Rech.f.) Ikonn.; Kuhitangia Ovcz.; Ochotonophila Gilli; Scleranthopsis Rech.f.; Timaeosia Klotzsch

= Acanthophyllum =

Genus of flowering plants in the pink family

Acanthophyllum is a genus of flowering plants in the family Caryophyllaceae with about 75 species, spread in the Irano-Turanian area.

== Description ==
Small, shrubby perennial plants with spiny leaves. Flowers white or pink, sessile in solitary or globose heads. Spiny bracts. Calyx cylindrical, with 5 teeth. Petals 5, entire or retuse. Stamens 20. Capsule ovoid, irregularly dehiscent from base. Reniform seeds.

== Taxonomy ==
The genus was described by Carl Anton von Meyer and published in Verzeichness der Pflanzen des Caspischen Meeres 210, 1831. The type species is Acanthophyllum mucronatum C.A.Mey.

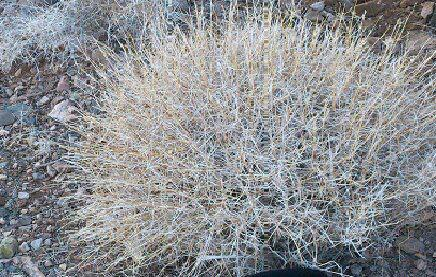
Acanthophyllum squarrosum in Iran

== Species ==
As of March 2023, Plants of the World Online accepted the following species:

- Acanthophyllum acerosum Sosn.
- Acanthophyllum aculeatum Schischk.
- Acanthophyllum adenophorum Freyn
- Acanthophyllum afghanicum (Podlech) A.Pirani & Zarre
- Acanthophyllum albidum Schischk.
- Acanthophyllum allochrusoides (Gilli) Pirani
- Acanthophyllum andarabicum Podlech ex Schiman-Czeika
- Acanthophyllum andersenii Schiman-Czeika
- Acanthophyllum anisocladum Schiman-Czeika
- Acanthophyllum aphananthum Rech.f.
- Acanthophyllum bilobum Schiman-Czeika
- Acanthophyllum bracteatum Boiss.
- Acanthophyllum brevibracteatum Lipsky
- Acanthophyllum bungei (Boiss.) Trautv.
- Acanthophyllum caespitosum Boiss.
- Acanthophyllum cerastioides (D.Don) Madhani & Zarre
- Acanthophyllum coloratum Schischk.
- Acanthophyllum crassifolium Boiss.
- Acanthophyllum cyrtostegium Vved.
- Acanthophyllum diaphanopterum A.Pirani & Moazzeni
- Acanthophyllum diezianum Hand.-Mazz.
- Acanthophyllum eglandulosum (Hedge & Wendelbo) Pirani
- Acanthophyllum ejtehadii Mahmoudi & Vaezi
- Acanthophyllum ekbergii (Hedge & Wendelbo) A.Pirani & Rabeler
- Acanthophyllum elatius Bunge
- Acanthophyllum flavum (Dickoré & Freitag) A.Pirani & Rabeler
- Acanthophyllum glandulosum Bunge ex Boiss.
- Acanthophyllum gracile Bunge ex Boiss.
- Acanthophyllum grandiflorum Stocks
- Acanthophyllum gypsophiloides Regel
- Acanthophyllum herniarioides (Boiss.) Madhani & Zarre
- Acanthophyllum honigbergeri (Fenzl) Barkoudah
- Acanthophyllum kabulicum Schiman-Czeika
- Acanthophyllum kandaharicum Gilli
- Acanthophyllum kermanense (Bornm.) A.Pirani & Rabeler
- Acanthophyllum knorringianum Schischk.
- Acanthophyllum korolkowii Regel & Schmalh.
- Acanthophyllum korshinskyi Schischk.
- Acanthophyllum krascheninnikovii Schischk.
- Acanthophyllum lamondiae Schiman-Czeika
- Acanthophyllum laxiflorum Boiss.
- Acanthophyllum laxiusculum Schiman-Czeika
- Acanthophyllum lilacinum Schischk.
- Acanthophyllum lindbergii (Hedge & Wendelbo) A.Pirani & Oxelman
- Acanthophyllum longicalyx Hedge & Wendelbo
- Acanthophyllum luteum (Falat. & Mahmoodi) A.Pirani & Kovalchuk
- Acanthophyllum maimanense Schiman-Czeika
- Acanthophyllum makranicum (Rech.f.) A.Pirani & Rabeler
- Acanthophyllum mikeschinianum Yukhan. & Kuvaev
- Acanthophyllum mucronatum C.A.Mey.
- Acanthophyllum myrianthum (Rech.f.) Madhani & A.Pirani
- Acanthophyllum oppositiflorum Aytaç
- Acanthophyllum pachycephalum Schiman-Czeika
- Acanthophyllum pachystegium Rech.f.
- Acanthophyllum paniculatum Regel & Herder
- Acanthophyllum persicum (Boiss.) A.Pirani & Rabeler
- Acanthophyllum pleiostegium Schiman-Czeika
- Acanthophyllum popovii (Preobr.) Barkoudah
- Acanthophyllum pulcherrimum Hedge & Wendelbo
- Acanthophyllum pulchrum Schischk.
- Acanthophyllum pungens (Bunge) Boiss.
- Acanthophyllum raphiophyllum (Rech.f.) Barkoudah
- Acanthophyllum recurvum Regel
- Acanthophyllum sarawschanicum Golenkin
- Acanthophyllum scapiflorum (Akhtar) Schiman-Czeika
- Acanthophyllum schugnanicum Schischk.
- Acanthophyllum sedifolium (Kurz) Madhani & Zarre
- Acanthophyllum sordidum Bunge ex Boiss.
- Acanthophyllum speciosum Schiman-Czeika
- Acanthophyllum spinosum (Desf.) C.A.Mey.
- Acanthophyllum squarrosum Boiss.
- Acanthophyllum stenocalycinum (Rech.f. & Schiman-Czeika) A.Pirani & Moazzeni
- Acanthophyllum stenostegium Freyn
- Acanthophyllum stocksianum Boiss.
- Acanthophyllum subglabrum Schischk.
- Acanthophyllum tadshikistanicum (Schischk.) Schischk.
- Acanthophyllum takhtajanii (Gabrieljan & Dittrich) A.Pirani & Rabeler
- Acanthophyllum transhyrcanum G.Preobr.
- Acanthophyllum versicolor Fisch. & C.A.Mey.
- Acanthophyllum verticillatum C.A.Mey.
- Acanthophyllum xanthoporphyranthum Hedge & Wendelbo
- Acanthophyllum yasamin-nassehiae Joharchi & A.Pirani

== Bibliography ==
1. Bailey, L.H. & E.Z. Bailey. 1976. Hortus Third i–xiv, 1–1290. MacMillan, New York.
2. Nasir, E. & S. I. Ali (eds). 1980–2005. Fl. Pakistan Univ. of Karachi, Karachi.
