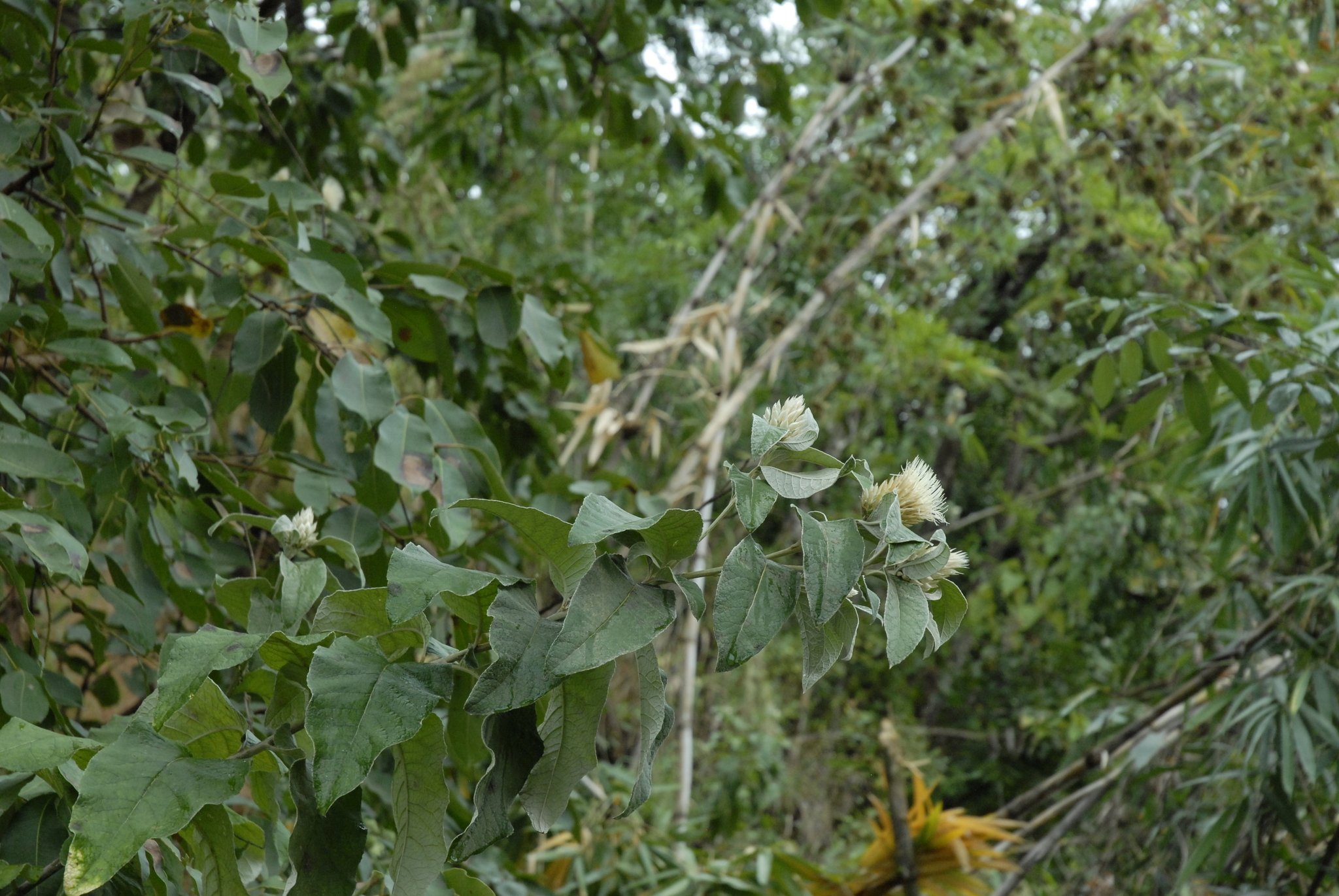

Scientific classification
- Kingdom: Plantae
- Clade: Tracheophytes
- Clade: Angiosperms
- Clade: Eudicots
- Clade: Asterids
- Order: Asterales
- Family: Asteraceae
- Subfamily: Carduoideae
- Tribe: Cardueae
- Genus: Ochrocephala; Dittrich
- Species: O. imatongensis

Binomial name
- Ochrocephala imatongensis (Philipson) Dittrich

Synonyms
- Centaurea imatongensis Philipson; Leuzea imatongensis (Philipson) Holub; Rhaponticum imatongense (Philipson) Soják; Stemmacantha imatongensis (Philipson) Soldano

= Ochrocephala =

Genus of flowering plants

Ochrocephala is a genus of Ethiopian flowering plants in the tribe Cardueae within the daisy family Asteraceae. Its only known species is Ochrocephala imatongensis, native to Ethiopia.
