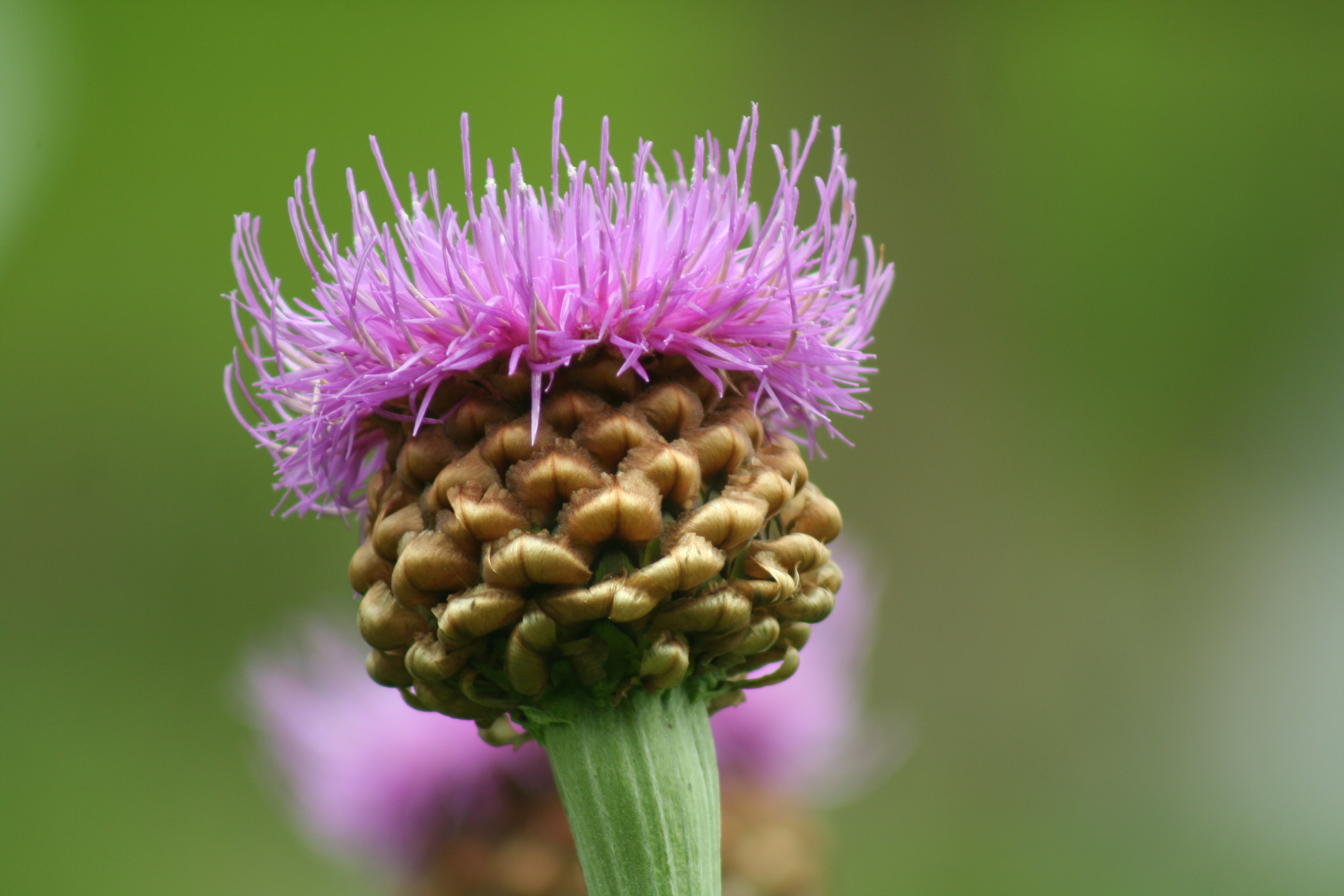
- Rhaponticum scariosum

Scientific classification
- Kingdom: Plantae
- Clade: Embryophytes
- Clade: Tracheophytes
- Clade: Spermatophytes
- Clade: Angiosperms
- Clade: Eudicots
- Clade: Asterids
- Order: Asterales
- Family: Asteraceae
- Tribe: Cardueae
- Genus: Rhaponticum; Ludw.

Synonyms
- List: Centaurium Haller; Acroptilon Cass.; Klaseopsis L.Martins; Leuzea DC.; Malacocephalus Tausch; Rhapontica Hill; Stemmacantha Cass.

= Rhaponticum =

Genus of flowering plants in the daisy family

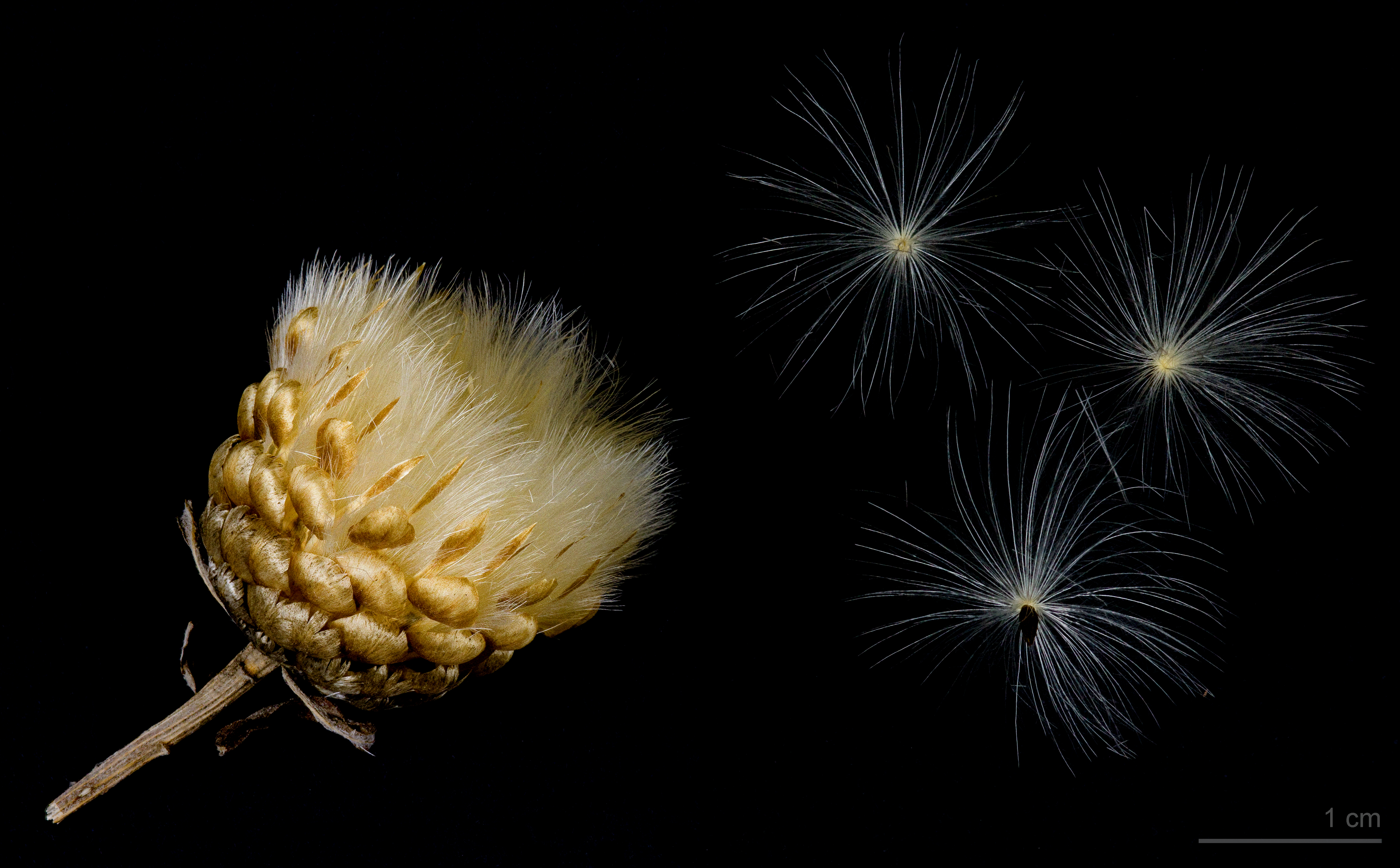
Rhaponticum coniferum - MHNT

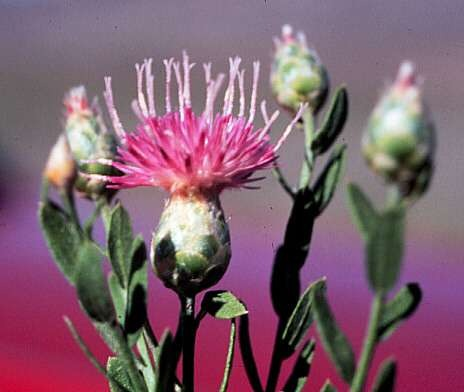
Rhaponticum repens

Rhaponticum is a genus of flowering plants in the tribe Cardueae within the family Asteraceae. As of November 2023, it is accepted by Plants of the World Online, but rejected by the Global Compositae Database in favour of Leuzea.

== Taxonomy ==
The taxonomic history of the genus name Rhaponticum is complicated. It has been published at least four times according to the International Plant Names Index. The earliest was by Albrecht von Haller in 1742, which is regarded as an invalid name (nom. inval.). The next publication was by Sébastien Vaillant in 1754, also an invalid name. The next was by Christian Gottlieb Ludwig in 1757. This has become a conserved name (nom. cons.), with the conserved type species Centaurea rhapontica (syn. Leuzea rhapontica subsp. rhapontica). A subsequent publication by Michel Adanson in 1763 is illegitimate.

Combining the genera Rhaponticum and Leuzea under the latter name was first suggested by Josef Holub in 1973. A 2006 phylogenetic study confirmed that as then circumscribed the genus Leuzea was embedded within Rhaponticum. As of November 2023, the Global Composite Database considers all four Rhaponticum names as synonyms of the genus Leuzea.

=== Species ===
The following species are recognised in the genus Rhaponticum:

- Rhaponticum acaule (L.) DC.
- Rhaponticum altaicum (Fisch. ex Spreng.) Soskov
- Rhaponticum annae-bentiae Rech.f.
- Rhaponticum aulieatense Iljin
- Rhaponticum australe (Gaudich.) Soskov
- Rhaponticum berardioides (Batt.) Hidalgo
- Rhaponticum canariense DC.
- Rhaponticum carthamoides (Willd.) Iljin – maral root, rhaponticum
- Rhaponticum centauroides (L.) O.Bolòs
- Rhaponticum chinense (S.Moore) L.Martins & Hidalgo
- Rhaponticum coniferum (L.) Greuter
- Rhaponticum cossonianum (Ball) Greuter
- Rhaponticum exaltatum (Cutanda ex Willk.) Greuter
- Rhaponticum heleniifolium Gren. & Godr.
- Rhaponticum insigne (Boiss.) Wagenitz
- Rhaponticum integrifolium C.Winkl.
- Rhaponticum karatavicum Regel & Schmalh.
- Rhaponticum longifolium (Hoffmanns. & Link) Soskov
- Rhaponticum lyratum C.Winkl. ex Iljin
- Rhaponticum namanganicum Iljin
- Rhaponticum nanum Lipsky
- Rhaponticum nitidum Fisch. ex DC.
- Rhaponticum pulchrum Fisch. & C.A.Mey.
- Rhaponticum pygmaeum DC.
- Rhaponticum repens (L.) Hidalgo – Russian knapweed
- Rhaponticum scariosum Lam. – giant scabiosa
- Rhaponticum uniflorum (L.) DC.
