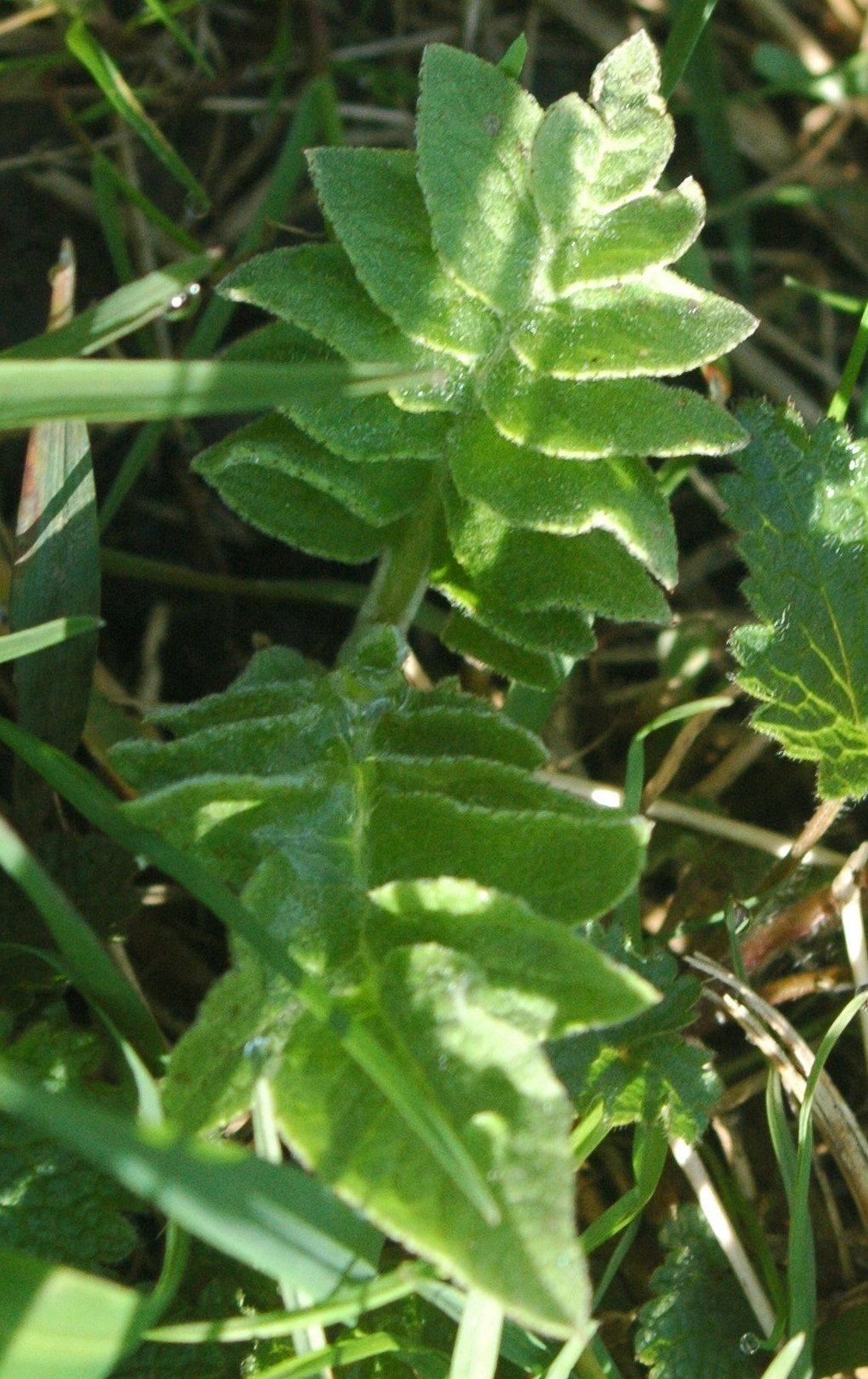

Scientific classification
- Kingdom: Plantae
- Clade: Embryophytes
- Clade: Tracheophytes
- Clade: Spermatophytes
- Clade: Angiosperms
- Clade: Eudicots
- Clade: Asterids
- Order: Asterales
- Family: Asteraceae
- Genus: Rhaponticum
- Species: R. carthamoides

Binomial name
- Rhaponticum carthamoides (Willd.) Iljin

Synonyms
- List: Carduus carthamoides (Willd.) Steud.; Centaurea carthamoides (Willd.) B.Fedtsch.; Cirsium carthamoides (Willd.) Link; Cnicus carthamoides Willd.; Fornicium carthamoides (Willd.) Kamelin; Leuzea carthamoides (Willd.) DC.; Serratula carthamoides (Willd.) Poir.; Stemmacantha carthamoides (Willd.) Dittrich

= Rhaponticum carthamoides =

Maral root

Species of flowering plant in the daisy family

Rhaponticum carthamoides, synonym Leuzea carthamoides, is a species of herbaceous perennial plant in the family Asteraceae. It is known as maral root or rhaponticum. It inhabits the sub-alpine zone (4,500–6,000 ft (1,400–1,800 m) above sea level) as well as alpine meadows. It can be found growing wild in Southern Siberia, Kazakhstan, the Altay region, and Western Sayan Mountains. Maral root is widely cultivated throughout Russia and Eastern Europe. This plant derives its traditional name maral root (maralu) from the maral deer that fed on it.

R. carthamoides is high in 20-hydroxyecdysone, a steroidal substance that can disrupt the molting and reproduction of arthropods.

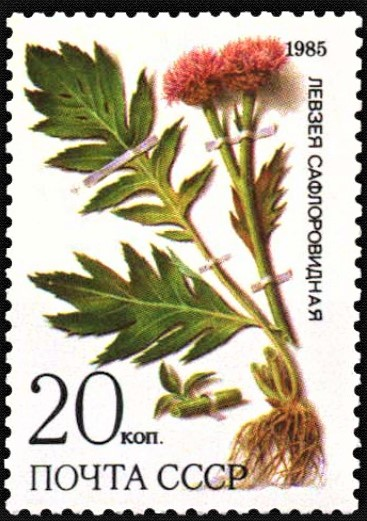
1985 USSR stamp, depicting Rhaponticum carthamoides
