= William Barbey =

Swiss botanist (1842–1914)

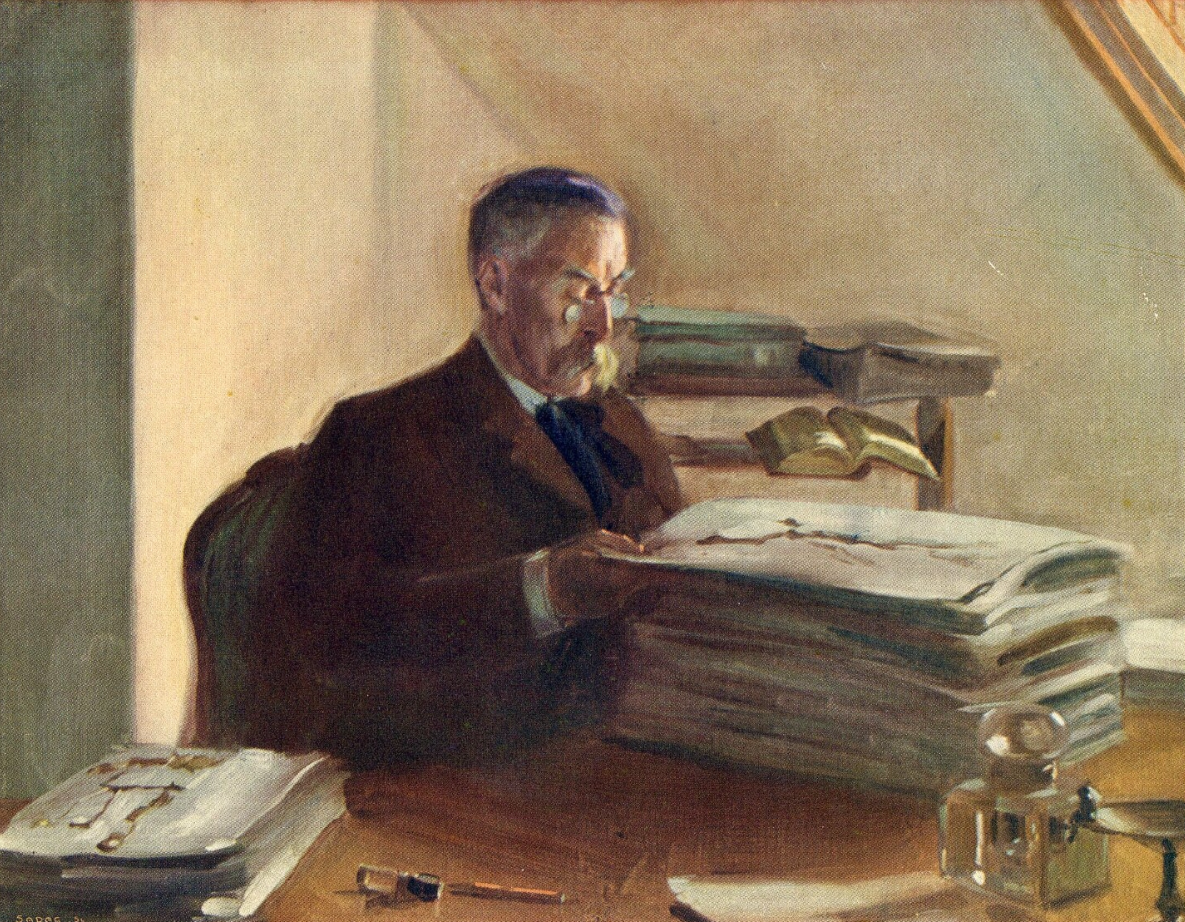
William Barbey

William Barbey (also known as William Barbey-Boissier after his marriage; 14 July 1842 – 18 November 1914) was a Swiss botanist and politician. The standard author abbreviation Barbey is used to indicate this person as the author when citing a botanical name.

== Biography ==
Barbey was born on 14 July 1842 in Genthod, in the canton of Geneva, the son of Henri Barbey and Hélène-Marie Iselin. He attended the Academy of Geneva and then studied engineering at the École Centrale de Paris. From 1862 to 1869, Barbey worked at an export business in New York City. He married Caroline Boissier, the daughter of prominent botanist Edmond Boissier.

After his marriage, Barbey studied botany and undertook botanical research in Spain, Palestine, Greece and Asia Minor. In 1885, he founded the publication Bulletin de l'Herbier Boissier, which in 1910 became the Bulletin de la société botanique de Genève. He built, largely at his own expense, the Yverdon–Saint-Croix railway. However, as a supporter of Sunday observance, he insisted that the trains did not run on that day. He lived in, and was an honorary citizen of, Valeyres-sous-Rances and Sainte-Croix in the canton of Vaud. Barbey served as a Liberal member of the Grand Council of Vaud from 1885 to 1909. He died on 18 November 1914 in Chambésy, aged 72.
