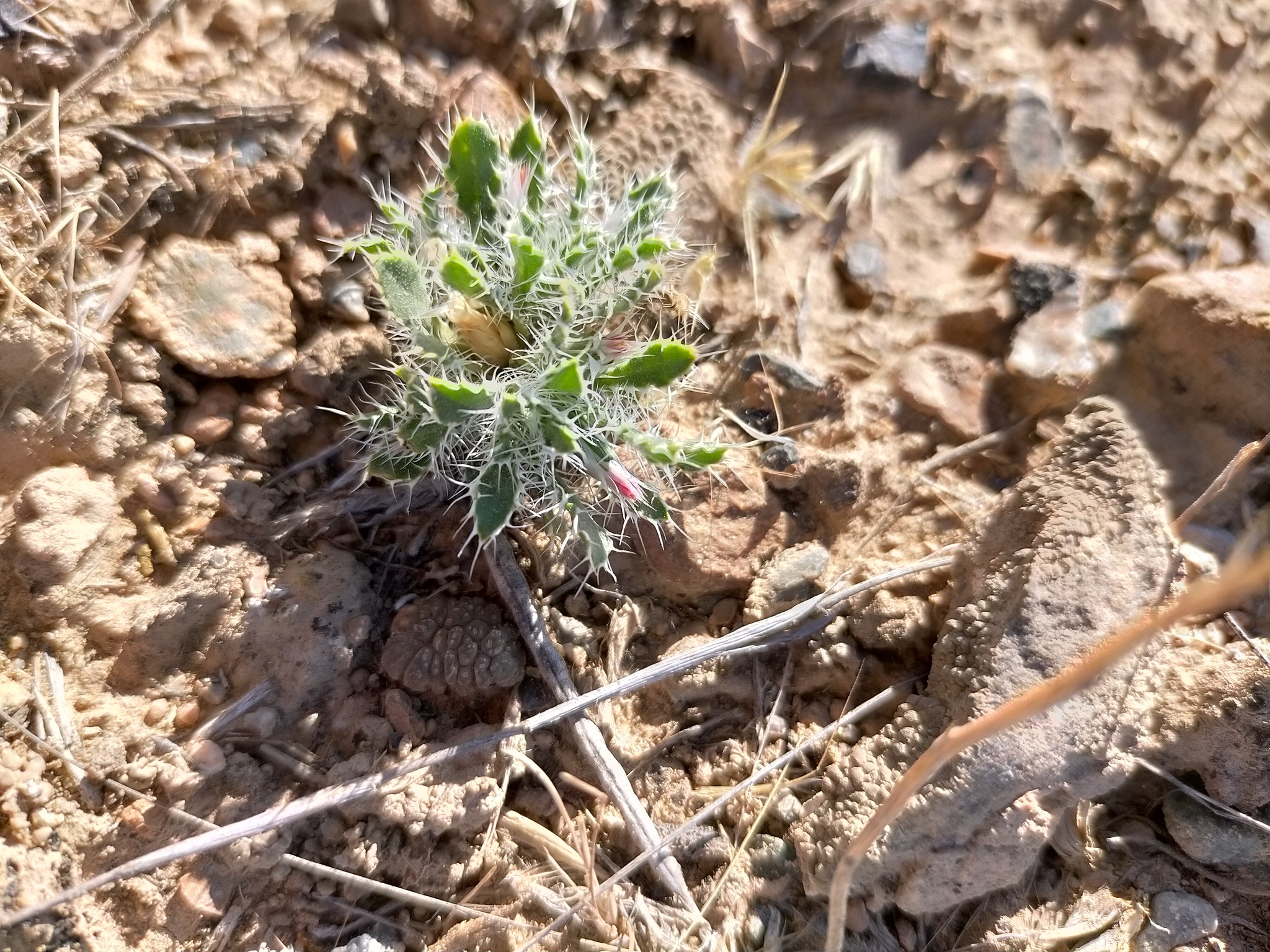
- Schischkinia albispina in Kazakhstan

Scientific classification
- Kingdom: Plantae
- Clade: Tracheophytes
- Clade: Angiosperms
- Clade: Eudicots
- Clade: Asterids
- Order: Asterales
- Family: Asteraceae
- Subfamily: Carduoideae
- Tribe: Cardueae
- Subtribe: Centaureinae
- Genus: Schischkinia; Iljin
- Species: S. albispina

Binomial name
- Schischkinia albispina (Bunge) Iljin

Synonyms
- Microlonchus albispinus Bunge; Centaurea albispina (Bunge) B.Fedtsch.; Oligochaeta leucosmerinx Rech.f. & Köie

= Schischkinia =

Genus of plants

Schischkinia is a genus of Asian flowering plants in the family Asteraceae.

== Species ==
There is only one known species, Schischkinia albispina, native to Asia: Kazakhstan, Uzbekistan, Kyrgyzstan, Tajikistan, Xinjiang, Afghanistan, and Iran.
