= Rhinactinidia =

Scientific classification
- Kingdom: Plantae
- Clade: Embryophytes
- Clade: Tracheophytes
- Clade: Spermatophytes
- Clade: Angiosperms
- Clade: Eudicots
- Clade: Asterids
- Order: Asterales
- Family: Asteraceae
- Subfamily: Asteroideae
- Tribe: Astereae
- Subtribe: Asterinae
- Genus: Rhinactinidia; Novopokr.
- Species: R. limoniifolia

Binomial name
- Rhinactinidia limoniifolia (Less.) Novopokr. ex Botsch.

Synonyms
- Krylovia Schischk.; Borkonstia Ignatov; Rhinactina Less. 1831, illegitimate homonym not Willd. 1807; Krylovia limoniifolia (Less.) Schischk.; Rhinactina limoniifolia Less.; Aster limoniifolius (Less.) B. Fedtsch.; Borkonstia limoniifolia (Less.) Ignatov

Genus of plants

Rhinactinidia is a genus of Asian plants in the tribe Astereae within the family Asteraceae.

Species

The only recognized species is Rhinactinidia limoniifolia, native to Mongolia, Tibet, Kazakhstan, Siberia, Kazakhstan, and Uzbekistan

formerly included

see Aster

- Rhinactinidia eremophila (Bunge) Novopokr. ex Botsch. - Aster eremophilus Bunge
- Rhinactinidia novopokrovskyi (Krasch. & Iljin) Novopokr. ex Botsch. - Aster novopokrovskyi Iljin
- Rhinactinidia popovii (Botsch.) Botsch. - Aster popovii Botsch.
