= Myopordon =

Scientific classification
- Kingdom: Plantae
- Clade: Embryophytes
- Clade: Tracheophytes
- Clade: Spermatophytes
- Clade: Angiosperms
- Clade: Eudicots
- Clade: Asterids
- Order: Asterales
- Family: Asteraceae
- Subfamily: Carduoideae
- Tribe: Cardueae
- Subtribe: Centaureinae
- Genus: Myopordon; Boiss.

Synonyms
- Autrania C.Winkl. & Barbey

Genus of flowering plants

Myopordon is a genus of flowering plants in the tribe Cardueae within the family Asteraceae which found in Middle-East.

Species

- Myopordon aucheri Boiss. – Iran
- Myopordon damavandica Mozaff. – Iran
- Myopordon hyrcanum (Bornm.) Wagenitz – Iran
- Myopordon persicum Boiss. – Iran
- Myopordon pulchellum (C.Winkl. & Barbey) Wagenitz – Lebanon
- Myopordon thiebautii (Genty) Wagenitz – Lebanon, Syria, Turkey
