= Pierre Edmond Boissier =

Swiss botanist and explorer (1810-1885)

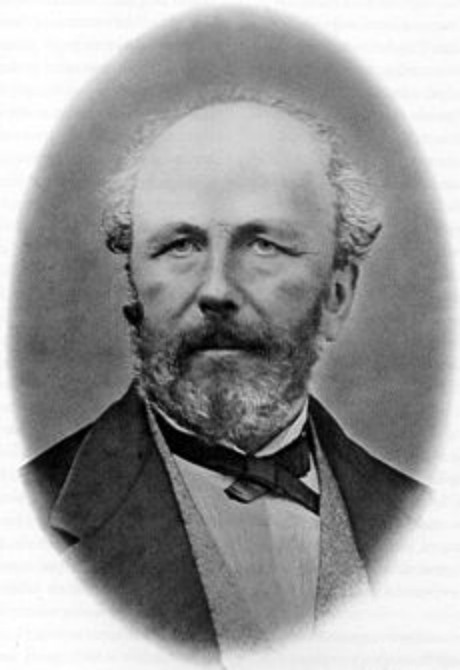
- Born: May 25, 1810; Geneva, France
- Died: September 25, 1885 (aged 75); Valeyres-sous-Rances, Switzerland
- Education: Academy of Geneva
- Spouse: Lucile Butini
- Children: Caroline Barbey-Boissier
- Scientific career
- Fields: Botany
- Academic advisors: Augustin Pyramus de Candolle
- Author abbrev. (botany): Boiss.

Pierre Edmond Boissier (25 May, 1810, Geneva – 25, September, 1885, Valeyres-sous-Rances) was a Swiss botanist and explorer. He was the son of Jacques Boissier (1784-1857) and Caroline Butini (1786-1836), daughter of Pierre Butini (1759-1838), a well-known naturalist from Geneva. With his sister, Valérie Boissier (1813-1894), he received a strict education with lessons delivered in Italian and Latin. Edmond's interest in natural history stemmed from holidays in the company of his mother and his grandfather, Pierre Butini at Valeyres-sous-Rances. His hikes in the Jura and the Alps laid the foundation of his later zest for exploration and adventure. He attended a course at the Academy of Geneva given by Augustin Pyramus de Candolle.

Edmond Boissier collected extensively in Europe, North Africa and western Asia, on occasion accompanied by his daughter, Caroline Barbey-Boissier (1847-1918) and her husband, William Barbey (1842-1914), who collected in their own right for their Herbier Barbey-Boissier in Geneva. Edmond Boissier covered countries such as France, Greece, Italy, Norway, Portugal, Spain,the Balearic Islands, Switzerland, Algeria, Egypt, Libya, Armenia, Palestine, Jordan, Lebanon, Syria and Turkey. His specimens are held at the following herbaria: AK, AWH, B, BERN, BM, BORD, BP, BR, C, CAS, CGE, CN, DBN, E, E-GL, F, FABR, FI, FR, G, GE, GH, GOET, H, HAL, JE, K, KIEL, L, LAU, LE, LY, LZ, M, MA, MANCH, MEL, MICH, MO, MPU, NY, OXF, P, P-CO, PH, PI, STR, TCD, TO, W, WAG, WB (see List of herbaria).

He was the first to describe Allochrusa, Sclerocephalus, Jancaea, Prolongoa, Psychrogeton, Heteroderis, Myopordon, Aphanopleura, Ammiopsis, Crenosciadium, Diplotaenia, Ducrosia, Margotia, Lisaea, Ormosciadium, Polylophium, Microsciadium, Rhabdosciadium, Smyrniopsis, Stenotaenia, Thecocarpus, Trigonosciadium, Rhizocephalus, Coluteocarpus, Diceratella, Didymophysa, Eremobium, Graellsia, Heldreichia, Nasturtiopsis, Parlatoria, Physoptychis, Tchihatchewia, Paracaryum, Podonosma, Dorycnopsis, Erophaca, Acantholimon, Goniolimon and many more plant genera and taxa.

== Standard author abbreviation ==
The standard author abbreviation Boiss. is used to indicate this person as the author when citing a botanical name.

== List of selected publications ==
- Boissier, Pierre Edmond (1867–1884). Flora Orientalis: sive, Enumeratio plantarum in Oriente a Graecia et Aegypto ad Indiae fines hucusque observatarum. 5 vols. Geneva: H. Georg.
- Boissier, Pierre Edmond (1837). Voyage Botanique dans le Midi de l'Espagne pendant l'année.
- Boissier, Pierre Edmond (1838). Elenchus plantarum novarum ... in itinere hispanico legit.
- Boissier, Pierre Edmond; Reuter, George François (1842). Diagnoses plantarum novarum hispanicum.
- Boissier, Pierre Edmond; Reuter, George François (1852). Pugillus plantarum novarum Africae borealis Hispaniaeque australis.
- Boissier, Pierre Edmond. Diagnoses plantarum orientalium novarum.
- Boissier, Pierre Edmond; Buhse, Friedrich Alexander (1860). Aufzählung der auf einer Reise durch Transkaukasien und Persien gesammelten Pflanzen.
- Boissier, Pierre Edmond (1866). Icones Euphorbiarum.

== Eponymy ==
- The plant genera, Boissiera and also Petroedmondia (the family Apiaceae), are named in his honour.
- He is honoured in the plant taxa of; Asperula boissieri, Carthamus boissieri, Colchicum boissieri, Cordia boissieri, Convolvulus boissieri, Euphorbia boissieri, Haplophyllum boissieranum, Iris boissieri, Pyrus boissieriana, Thymus boissieri, Trifolium boissieri and Verbascum boissieri.
- As well as; the bacterium Acinetobacter boissieri, the air-breathing land snails Sphincterochila boissieri, Aceria boissieri ( gall mites) and the freshwater snail Bithynia boissieri are some of the animal species named after him.
- Boissiera is the title of a collection of systematic botany memoirs published by the Conservatoire et Jardin Botaniques de la Ville de Genève (CJB).
