= Acanthophyllum elatius =

Scientific classification
- Kingdom: Plantae
- Clade: Tracheophytes
- Clade: Angiosperms
- Clade: Eudicots
- Order: Caryophyllales
- Family: Caryophyllaceae
- Genus: Acanthophyllum
- Species: A. elatius

Binomial name
- Acanthophyllum elatius Bunge

Synonyms
- Acanthophyllum borsczowii Litv.; Acanthophyllum conjungens Rech.f.; Acanthophyllum spinosum Bunge

Species of plant

Acanthophyllum elatius is a species of plant in the family Caryophyllaceae. The species is perennial. It is native to central Asia.
