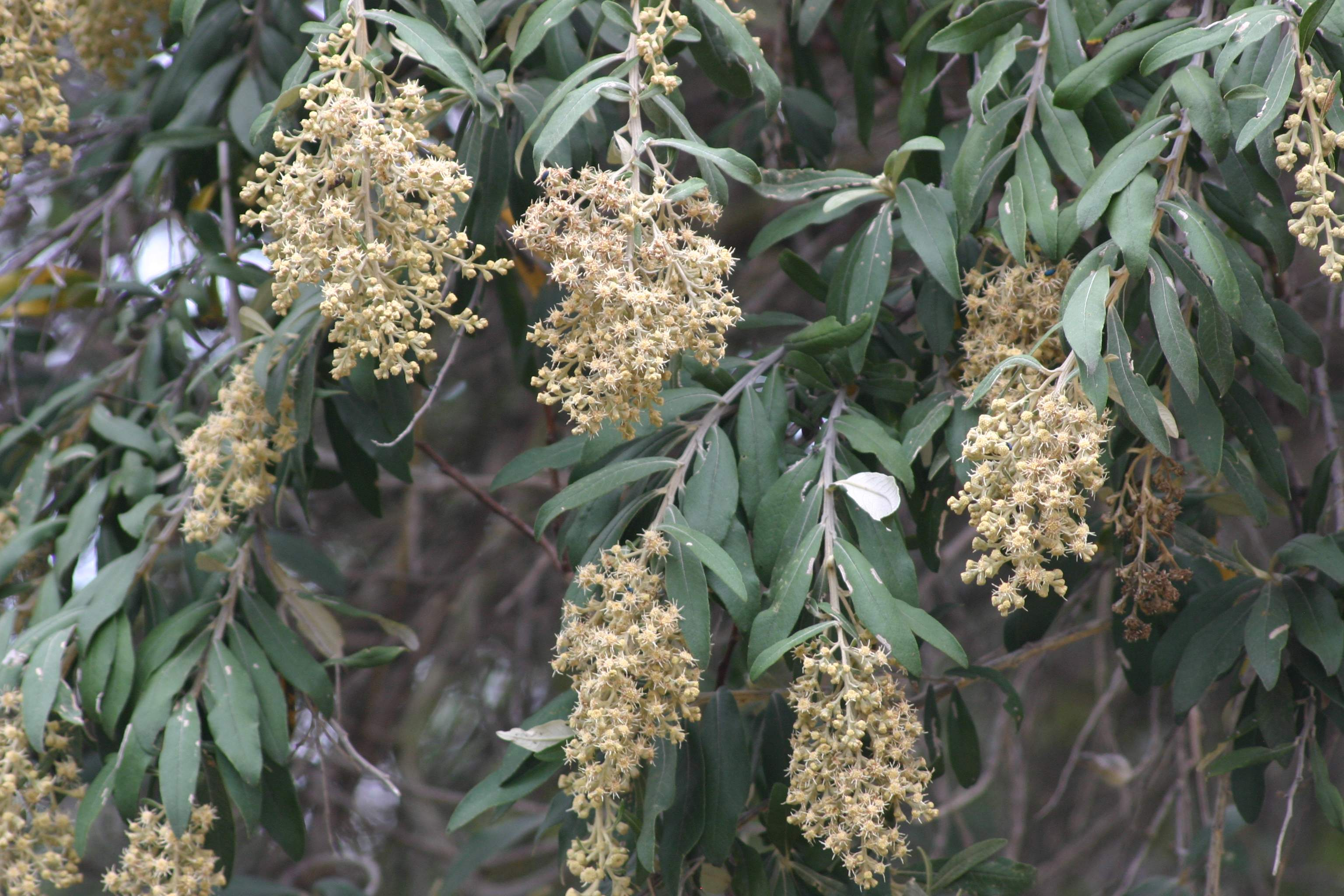
- Tarchonanthus camphoratus

Scientific classification
- Kingdom: Plantae
- Clade: Tracheophytes
- Clade: Angiosperms
- Clade: Eudicots
- Clade: Asterids
- Order: Asterales
- Family: Asteraceae
- Subfamily: Carduoideae
- Tribe: Tarchonantheae (Cass.) S.C. Keeley & R.K. Jansen

Subtribes
- Tarchonanthus; Brachylaena

Synonyms
- Tarchonanthinae Cass.

= Tarchonantheae =

Tribe of flowering plants

Tarchonantheae is a tribe of plants within the Asteraceae, or sunflower family, of flowering plants.

== Genera ==
- Tarchonanthus L.
- Brachylaena R.Br.
