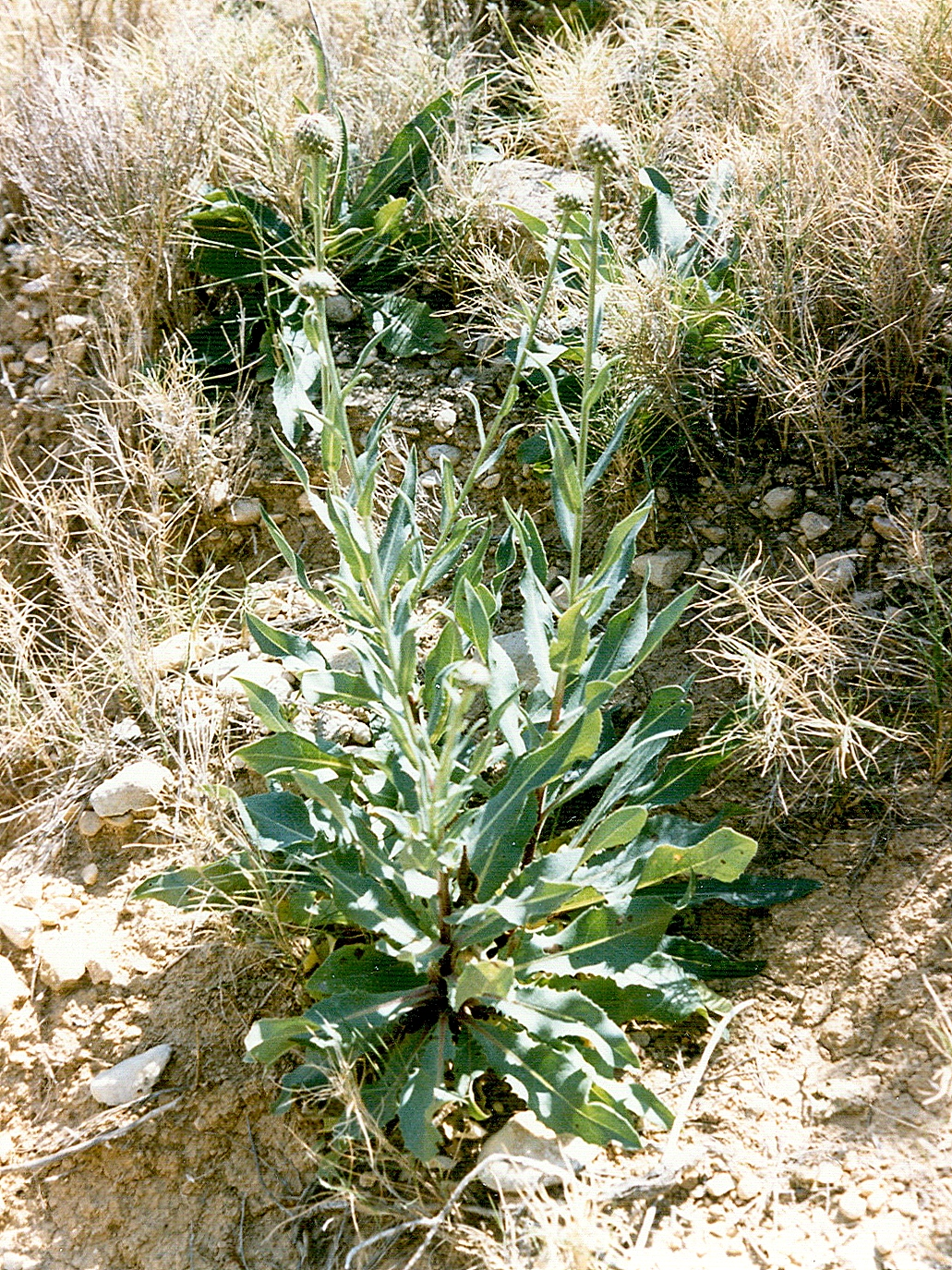
- Klasea flavescens

Scientific classification
- Kingdom: Plantae
- Clade: Tracheophytes
- Clade: Angiosperms
- Clade: Eudicots
- Clade: Asterids
- Order: Asterales
- Family: Asteraceae
- Subfamily: Carduoideae
- Tribe: Cardueae
- Subtribe: Centaureinae
- Genus: Klasea; Cass.

Type species
- Serratula centauroides L.

Synonyms
- Microlophopsis Czerep.; Nikitinia Iljin; Schumeria Iljin

= Klasea =

Genus of flowering plants

Klasea is a genus of Eurasian and North African flowering plants in the tribe Cardueae within the family Asteraceae.

== Species ==
According to the Global Compositae Database, there are 30 recognized species:

- Klasea aznavouriana (Bornm.) Greuter & Wagenitz
- Klasea baetica (Boiss. ex DC.) Holub
- Klasea bornmuelleri (Azn.) Greuter & Wagenitz
- Klasea bulgarica (Acht. & Stoj.) Holub
- Klasea cardunculus (Pall.) Holub
- Klasea caucasica (Boiss.) Greuter
- Klasea centauroides (L.) Cass. ex Kitag.
- Klasea cerinthifolia (Sm.) Greuter & Wagenitz
- Klasea coriacea (DC.) Holub
- Klasea cretica (Turrill) Holub
- Klasea erucifolia (L.) Greuter & Wagenitz
- Klasea flavescens (L.) Holub
- Klasea grandifolia (P.H.Davis) Greuter & Wagenitz
- Klasea hakkiarica (P.H.Davis) Greuter & Wagenitz
- Klasea haussknechtii (Boiss.) Holub
- Klasea integrifolia (Vahl) Greuter
- Klasea kotschyi (Boiss.) Greuter & Wagenitz
- Klasea kurdica (Post) Greuter & Wagenitz
- Klasea lasiocephala (Bornm.) Greuter & Wagenitz
- Klasea legionensis (Lacaita) Holub
- Klasea lycopifolia (Vill.) Á.Löve & D.Löve
- Klasea mouterdei (Arènes) Greuter & Wagenitz
- Klasea nudicaulis (L.) Fourr.
- Klasea oligocephala (DC.) Greuter & Wagenitz
- Klasea pinnatifida (Cav.) Talavera
- Klasea pinnatifida (Cav.) Cass.
- Klasea pusilla (Labill.) Greuter & Wagenitz
- Klasea quinquefolia (Willd.) Greuter & Wagenitz
- Klasea radiata (Waldst. & Kit.) Á.Löve & D.Löve
- Klasea serratuloides (DC.) Greuter & Wagenitz

Plants of the World Online recognizes more species, 55 in total.
