= Dicomopsis =

Scientific classification
- Kingdom: Plantae
- Clade: Tracheophytes
- Clade: Angiosperms
- Clade: Eudicots
- Clade: Asterids
- Order: Asterales
- Family: Asteraceae
- Subfamily: Carduoideae
- Tribe: Dicomeae
- Subtribe: Dicominae
- Genus: Dicomopsis; S.Ortiz
- Species: D. welwitschii

Binomial name
- Dicomopsis welwitschii (O.Hoffm.) S.Ortiz

Synonyms
- Dicoma welwitschii O.Hoffm.

Genus of flowering plants

Dicomopsis is a genus of flowering plants in the family Asteraceae. It includes a single species, Dicomopsis welwitschii, which is endemic to Angola.
