= Pasaccardoa =

Scientific classification
- Kingdom: Plantae
- Clade: Tracheophytes
- Clade: Angiosperms
- Clade: Eudicots
- Clade: Asterids
- Order: Asterales
- Family: Asteraceae
- Subfamily: Carduoideae
- Tribe: Dicomeae
- Genus: Pasaccardoa; O. Kuntze

Type species
- Pasaccardoa grantii (Bentham ex Oliver) O. Kuntze

Synonyms
- Passacardoa Wild; Phyllactinia Benth. ex Oliv. 1873 not Lev. 1851 (a fungus)

Genus of flowering plants

Pasaccardoa is a genus of African flowering plants in the family Asteraceae.

The genus is native to Angola, Tanzania, Zambia and Zaïre.

The genus was circumscribed by Carl Ernst Otto Kuntze in Revis. Gen. Pl. vol.1 on page 354 in 1891.

The genus name of Pasaccardoa is in honour of Pier Andrea Saccardo (1845–1920), who was an Italian botanist and mycologist.

Species

- Pasaccardoa baumii O.Hoffm.
- Pasaccardoa grantii (Benth. ex Oliv.) Kuntze
- Pasaccardoa jeffreyi Wild
- Pasaccardoa procumbens (Lisowski) G.V.Pope
