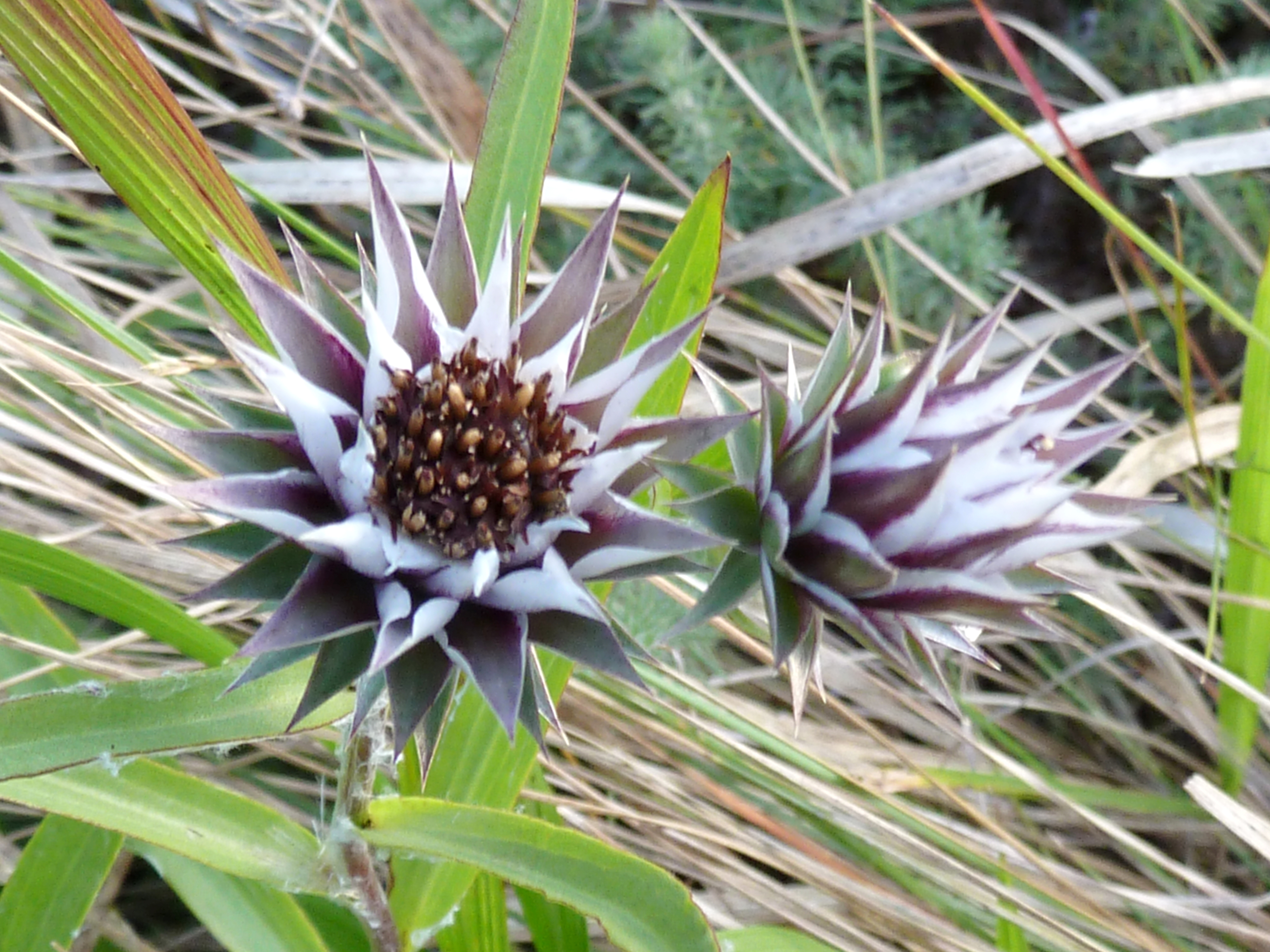
- foliage and flower heads

Scientific classification
- Kingdom: Plantae
- Clade: Tracheophytes
- Clade: Angiosperms
- Clade: Eudicots
- Clade: Asterids
- Order: Asterales
- Family: Asteraceae
- Genus: Macledium
- Species: M. zeyheri

Binomial name
- Macledium zeyheri (Sond.) S.Ortiz

Synonyms
- Dicoma zeyheri Sond.

= Macledium zeyheri =

Species of plant

Macledium zeyheri is a species of flowering plant in the family Asteraceae. It is found in Southern Africa, ranging through South Africa's Cape Provinces, KwaZulu-Natal, and Northern Provinces to Eswatini and Mozambique. Its natural habitats are subtropical or tropical dry shrubland and plantations, particularly along the KwaZulu-Natal coast.

== Traditional uses ==
The powdered roots of M. zeyheri are traditionally ascribed medical value, and are used to treat stomach disorders in both livestock and people.

== Gallery ==
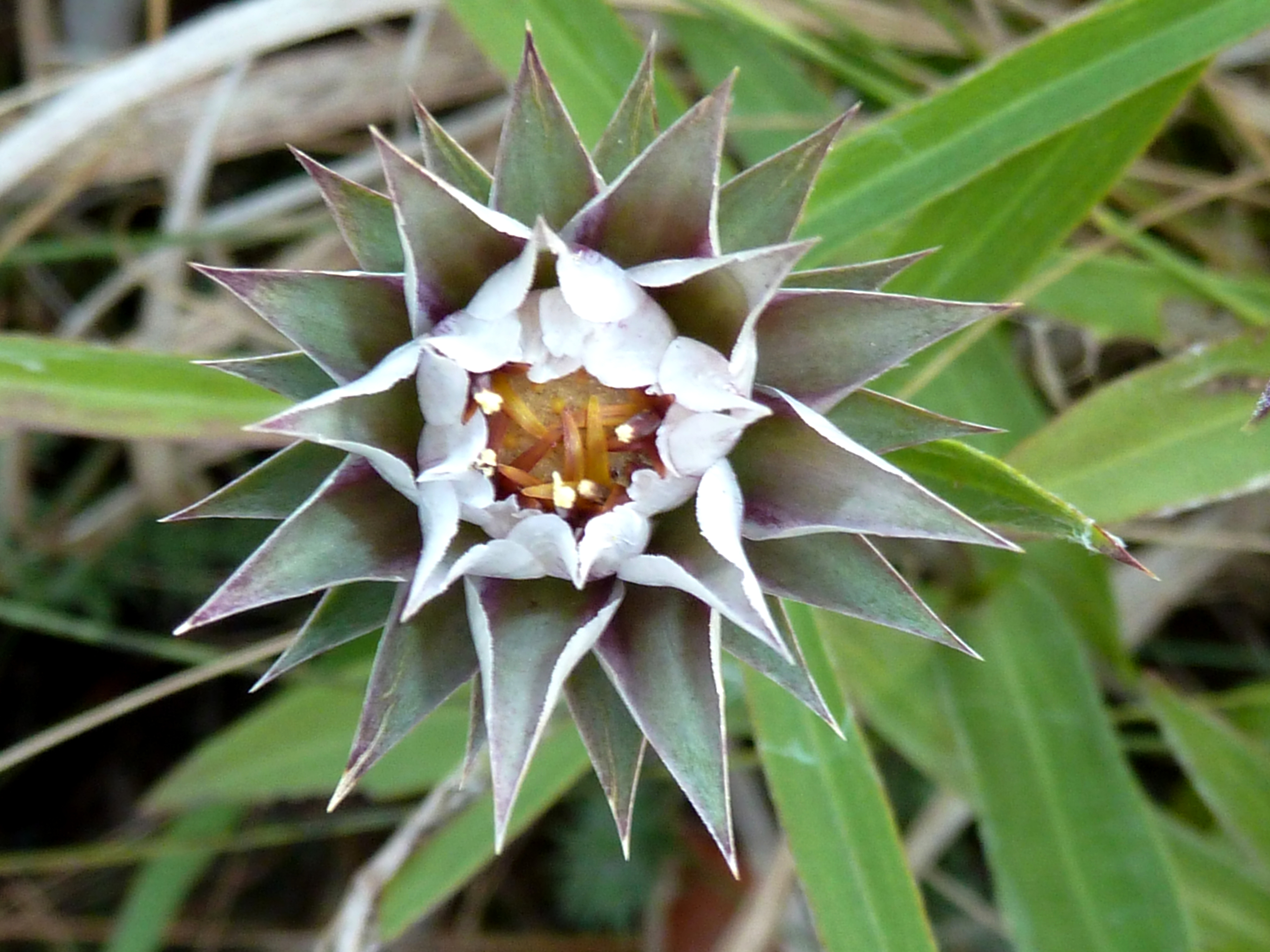
Opening flower

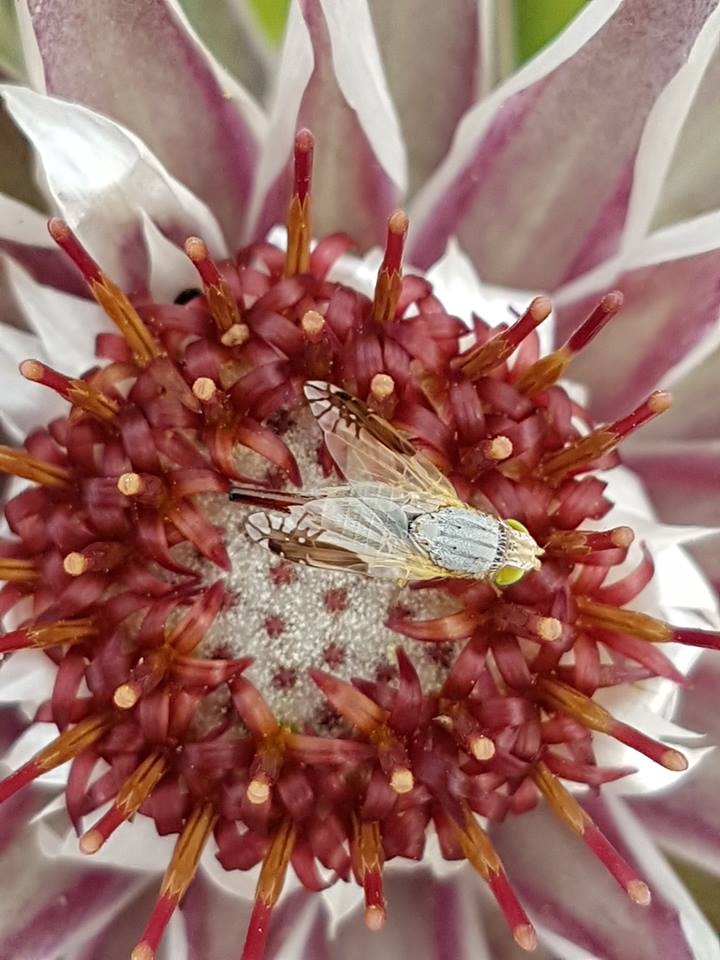
Close-up of flower head

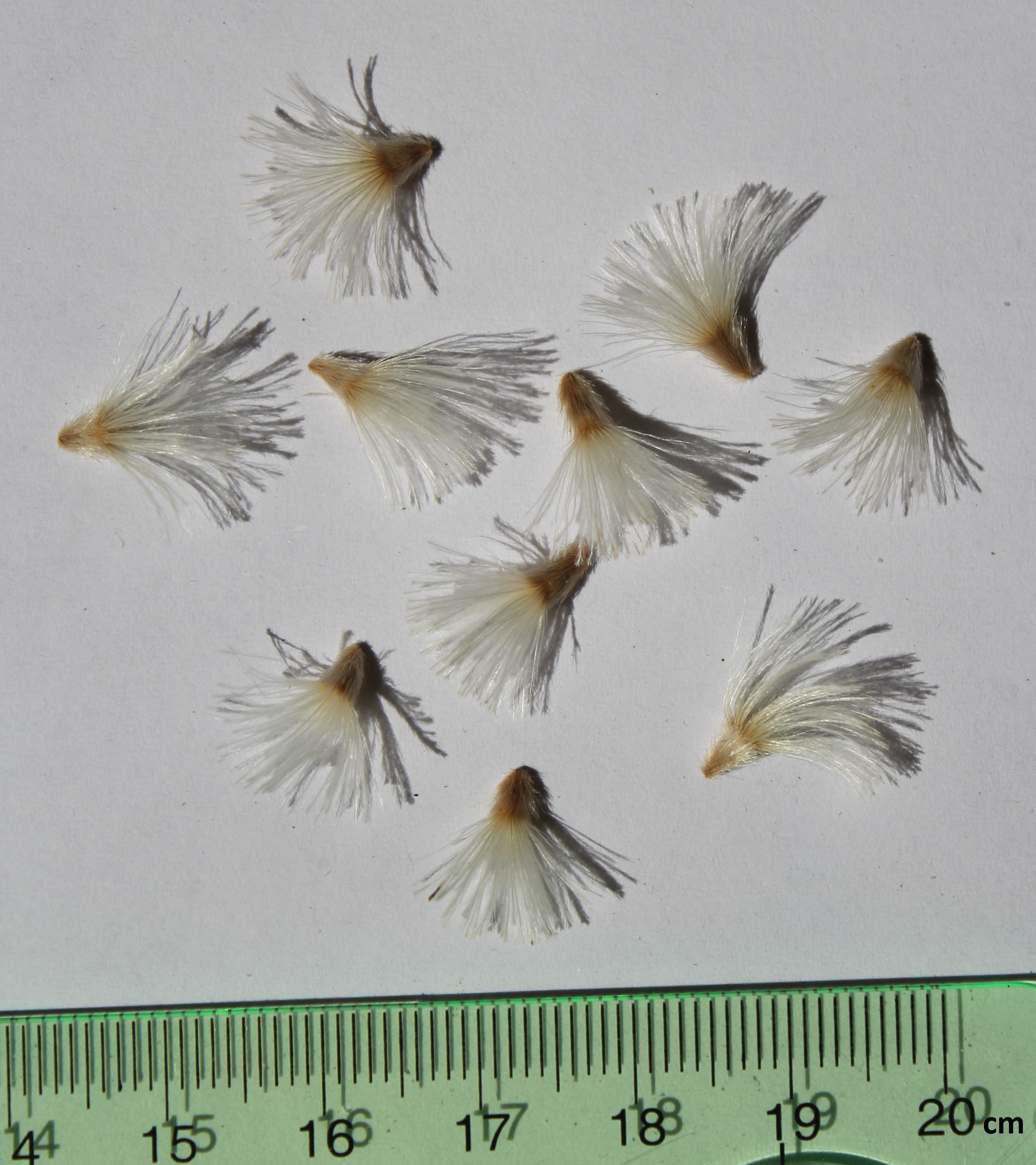
Seeds

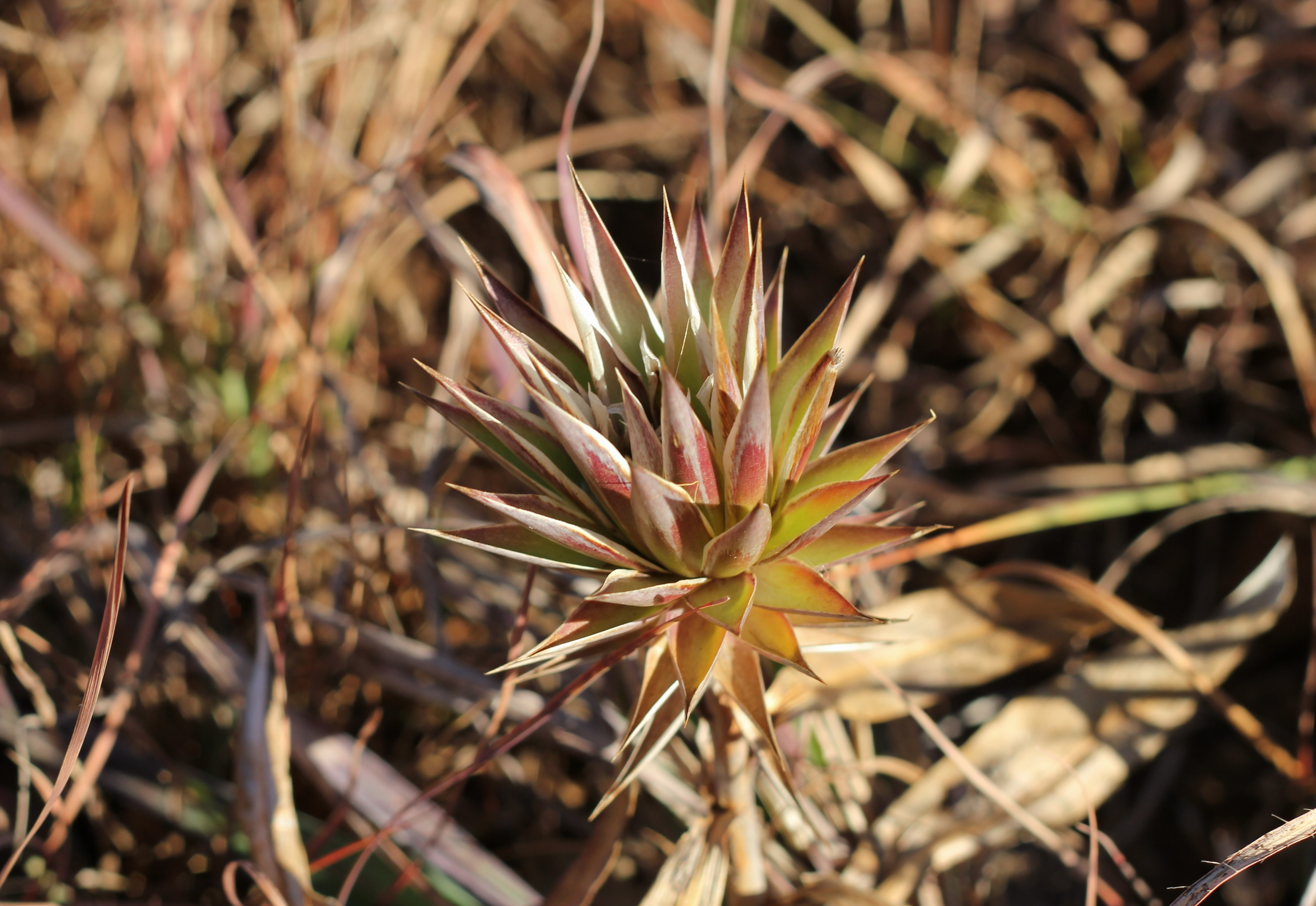
Involucral bracts after flowering
