= Dicoma swazilandica =

Scientific classification
- Kingdom: Plantae
- Clade: Tracheophytes
- Clade: Angiosperms
- Clade: Eudicots
- Clade: Asterids
- Order: Asterales
- Family: Asteraceae
- Genus: Dicoma
- Species: D. swazilandica

Binomial name
- Dicoma swazilandica S.Ortiz, Rodr.Oubiña & Pulgar

Species of plant

Dicoma swazilandica is a species of plant from Eswatini and South Africa.

== Description ==
=== Growth form ===
This herb grows to be up to 63 cm (25 in) tall. It has an erect, straited stem covered with simple white hairs and yellow glands.

=== Leaves ===
The leaves are erect and linear, ranging in size from 2–17 mm (0.079–0.669 in) wide and 40–110 mm (1.6–4.3 in) long. Te margins are finely toothed. The upper surface is greenish and often has yellow glands. It may have hairs or be hairless. The lower surface is densely hairy and has glands.

=== Flowers ===
The flowers are borne in typical daisy-like flowerheads. They are borne on erect stalks that may be surrounded by linear leaves. The surrounding whorls of bracts form an inverted cone shape. They grow in five or six )or sometimes seven) rows. They are straw coloured with a purple stripe on the midrib. The margins are finely serrated, especially towards the tips. The innermost bracts are longer than the outer ones and extend about 1–2 mm (0.039–0.079 in) beyond the pappus.

Each flowerhead contains about 25 florets. They are radially symmetrical and hermaphroditic. The corolla is a dull white in colour and has subepidermal star-shaped calcium oxalate crystals. The epidermal cells have short, glandular twin hairs. The stamens protrude slightly beyond the corolla. The filaments, like the corolla, have star-shaped calcium oxalate crystals. The style also has similar crystals. The stylar branches have sweeping hairs that form a subapical ring. The basal hairs are the longest.

=== Fruits and seeds ===
The rough achenes (dry fruits, each containing a single seed) are covered in ten ribs with hairs growing between them.

=== Similar species ===
This species is most similar to Dicoma anomola. It does, however, differ in several characteristics:

- The leaves of D. swazilandica are linear and flexible while those of D. anomola may be curved or linear.
- The involucre bracts of D. swazilandica form an inverted cone while those of D. anomola form a cell shape.
- The flowerheads of D. swazilandica typically consist of a single capitulum while those of D. anomola consist of multiple capitula.
- The achenes of D. anomola have glands between the ribs while those of D. swazilandica don't.
- The pappus bristles of D. swazilandica broaden conspicuously at the base, while those of D. anomola don't.

== Distribution and habitat ==
This species is found in Eswatini and in the Mpumalanga province of South Africa. It grows on stony hills at an altitude of about 1,685 m (5,528 ft) in grasslands and savannas.

== Conservation ==
This species is potentially threatened by plantations in Eswatini but occurs in a protected area in South Africa, and as such, is currently not threatened there.
