= Macledium pretoriense =

Conservation status
- Critically endangered, possibly extinct (IUCN 3.1)

Scientific classification
- Kingdom: Plantae
- Clade: Tracheophytes
- Clade: Angiosperms
- Clade: Eudicots
- Clade: Asterids
- Order: Asterales
- Family: Asteraceae
- Genus: Macledium
- Species: M. pretoriense

Binomial name
- Macledium pretoriense (C.A.Sm.) S.Ortiz

Synonyms
- Dicoma pretoriensis C.A.Sm.

Species of flowering plant

Macledium pretoriense, synonym Dicoma pretoriensis, is a species of flowering plant in the family Asteraceae. It is, or was, endemic to Gauteng, South Africa.

== Conservation ==
In 2003, it was assessed for the IUCN Red List as "critically endangered" (possibly extinct)". As of April 2023, Plants of the World Online regarded it as extinct.
