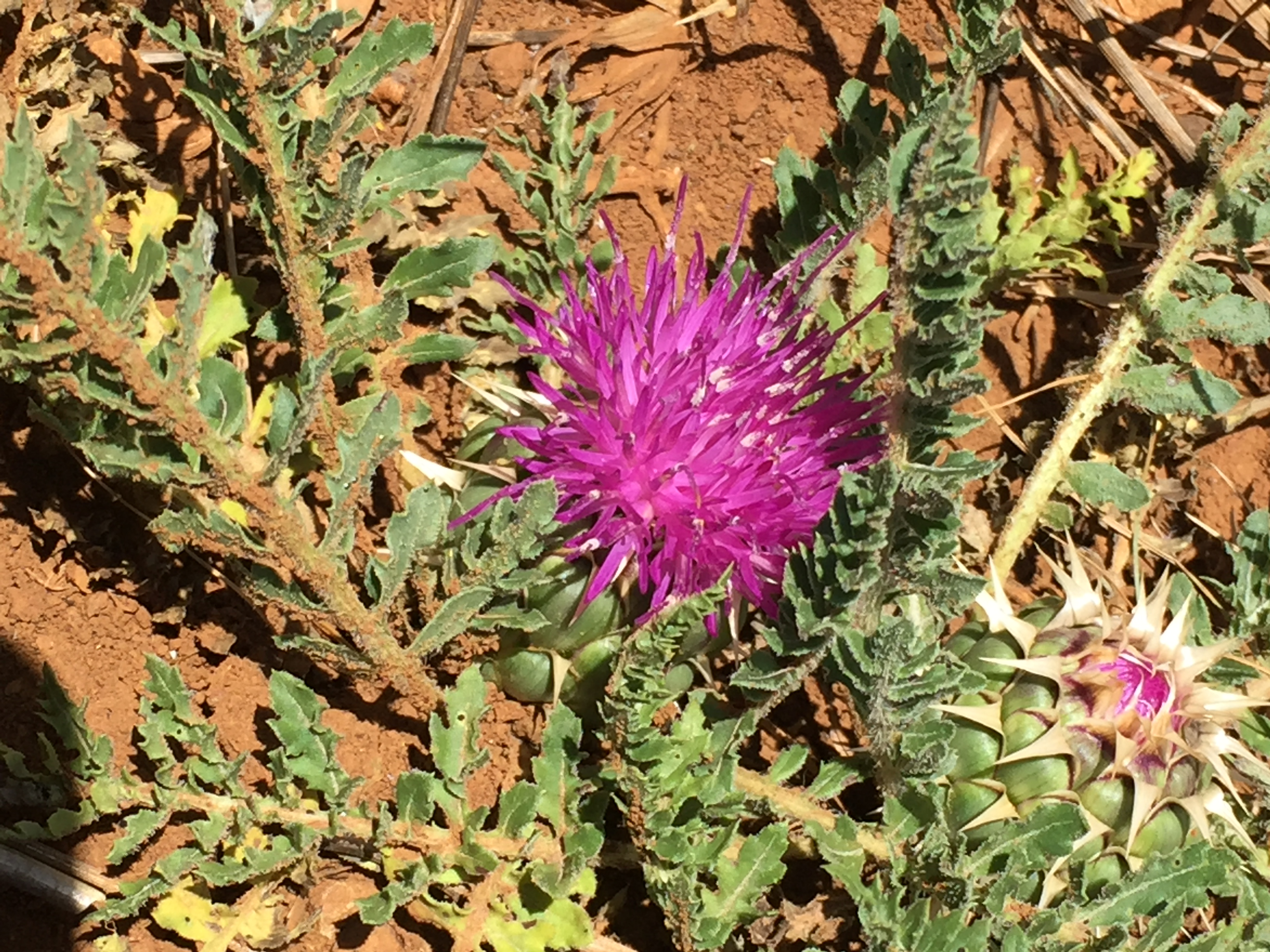
- Klasea pusilla growing on Joubbat El Mnaitra mountain, Lebanon

Scientific classification
- Kingdom: Plantae
- Clade: Tracheophytes
- Clade: Angiosperms
- Clade: Eudicots
- Clade: Asterids
- Order: Asterales
- Family: Asteraceae
- Genus: Klasea
- Species: K. pusilla

Binomial name
- Klasea pusilla (Labill.) Greuter & Wagenitz

Synonyms
- Serratula pusilla Labill. (M. Dittrich); Cynara pusilla Labill.; Rhaponticum pusillum (Labill.) Boiss.

= Klasea pusilla =

Species of plant in the Asteraceae family

Klasea pusilla (Arabic: ورخة قزمة), is a species of flowering plant in the genus Klasea within the family Asteraceae (previously in the genus Serratula). It is a native of the Eastern Mediterranean region .

== Description ==
Klasea pusilla has a thistle-like flower head, it flowers from April to June.

== Distribution and habitat ==
The plant grows in Lebanon, Syria, Israel and Jordan in Mediterranean semi-steppe shrubland.

== Research and uses ==
A 2014 study investigating the biological activity of Lebanese indigenous medicinal plants showed that whole plant extracts of K. pusilla has a significant repellent effect against the adult silverleaf whitefly, an important invasive agricultural pest.
