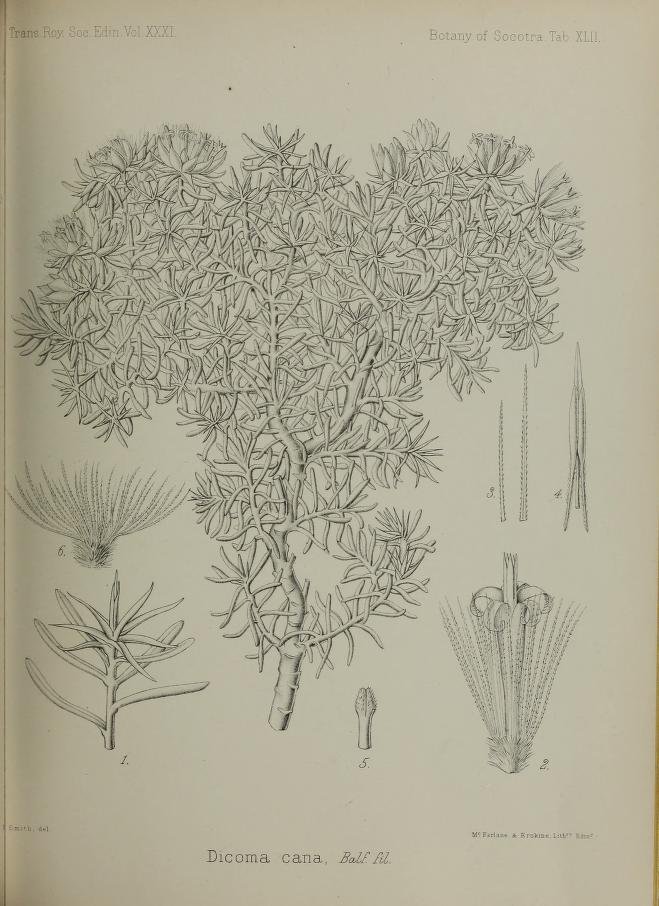

Conservation status
- Least Concern (IUCN 3.1)

Scientific classification
- Kingdom: Plantae
- Clade: Tracheophytes
- Clade: Angiosperms
- Clade: Eudicots
- Clade: Asterids
- Order: Asterales
- Family: Asteraceae
- Genus: Macledium
- Species: M. canum

Binomial name
- Macledium canum (Balf.f.) S.Ortiz

Synonyms
- Dicoma cana Balf.f.

= Macledium canum =

Species of flowering plant

Macledium canum, synonym Dicoma cana, is a species of flowering plant in the family Asteraceae. It is endemic to Socotra. Its natural habitats are subtropical or tropical dry shrubland and plantations.
