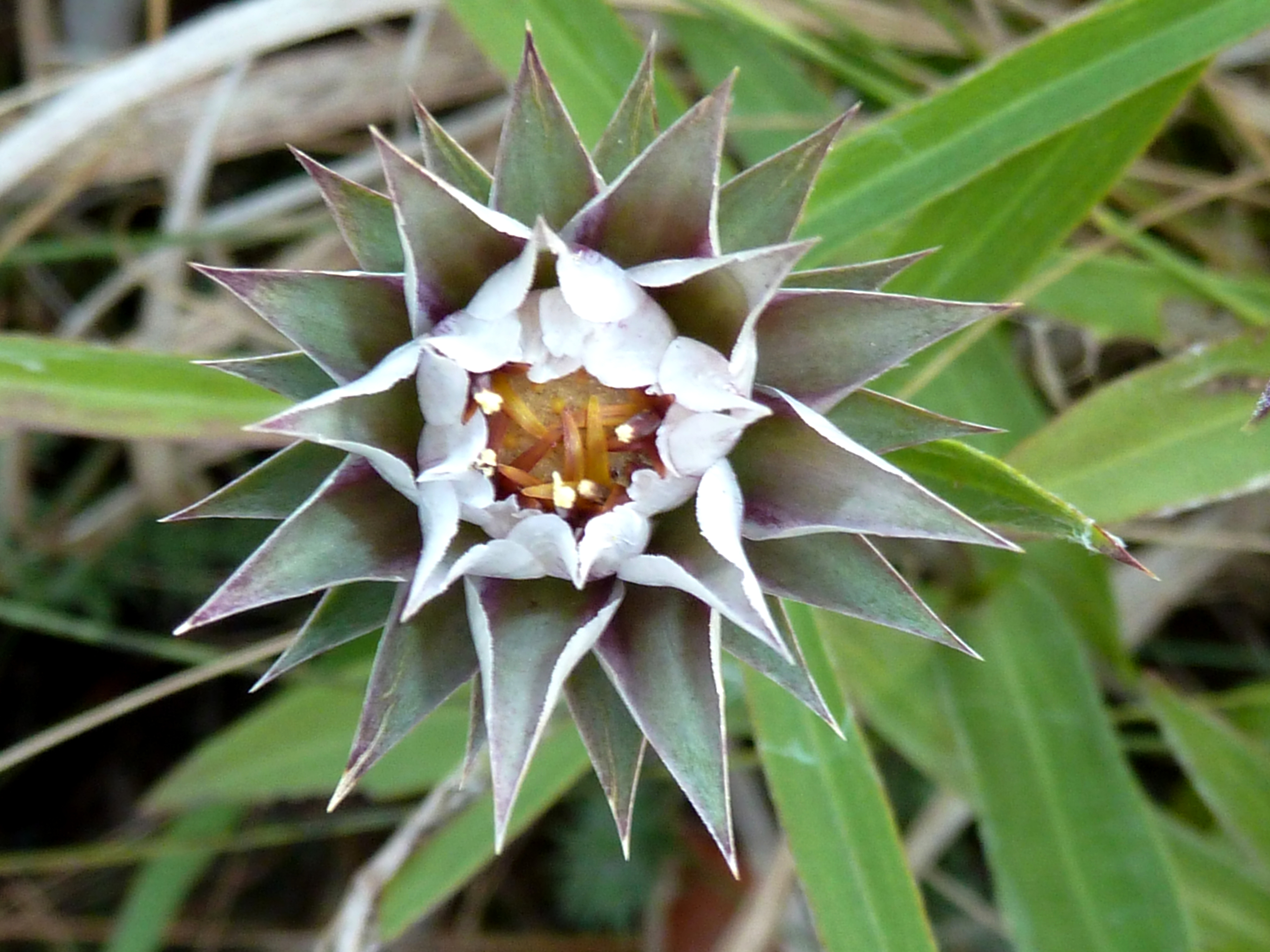
- Macledium zeyheri

Scientific classification
- Kingdom: Plantae
- Clade: Tracheophytes
- Clade: Angiosperms
- Clade: Eudicots
- Clade: Asterids
- Order: Asterales
- Family: Asteraceae
- Subfamily: Carduoideae
- Tribe: Dicomeae
- Genus: Macledium; Cass.

Species
- See text.

Synonyms
- Cryptostephane Sch.Bip.; Cullumiopsis Drake; Nitelium Cass.

= Macledium =

Genus of flowering plants

Macledium is a genus of flowering plants in the family Asteraceae. Both Macledium and Dicoma are distributed largely in tropical and southern Africa. Macledium is distinguished from genus Dicoma by a large number of characters relating to morphology and anatomy of phyllaries, corolla, anthers, style, cypsela and testa.

== Species ==
As of April 2023, Plants of the World Online accepted the following species:

- Macledium anmadochrissum (Lawalrée) S.Ortiz
- Macledium auriculatum (Hutch. & B.L.Burtt) S.Ortiz
- Macledium canum (Balf.f.) S.Ortiz
- Macledium ellipticum (G.V.Pope) S.Ortiz
- Macledium gossweileri (S.Moore) S.Ortiz
- Macledium grandidieri (Drake) S.Ortiz
- Macledium humile (Lawalrée) S.Ortiz
- Macledium kirkii (Harv.) S.Ortiz
- Macledium nanum (Welw. ex Hiern) S.Ortiz
- Macledium oblongum (Lawalrée & Mvukiy.) S.Ortiz
- Macledium plantaginifolium (O.Hoffm.) S.Ortiz
- Macledium poggei (O.Hoffm.) S.Ortiz
- Macledium pretoriense (C.A.Sm.) S.Ortiz
- Macledium relhanioides (Less.) S.Ortiz
- Macledium sessiliflorum (Harv.) S.Ortiz
- Macledium speciosum (DC.) S.Ortiz
- Macledium spinosum (L.) S.Ortiz
- Macledium zeyheri (Sond.) S.Ortiz

In southern Africa it is informally divided into the Cape and grassland groups:

- Cape species:
  - M. latifolium
  - M. relhanioides
  - M. spinosum
- Grassland species:
  - M. pretoriense
  - M. sessiliflorum subsp. sessiliflorum var. membranaceum
  - M. speciosum
  - M. zeyheri
