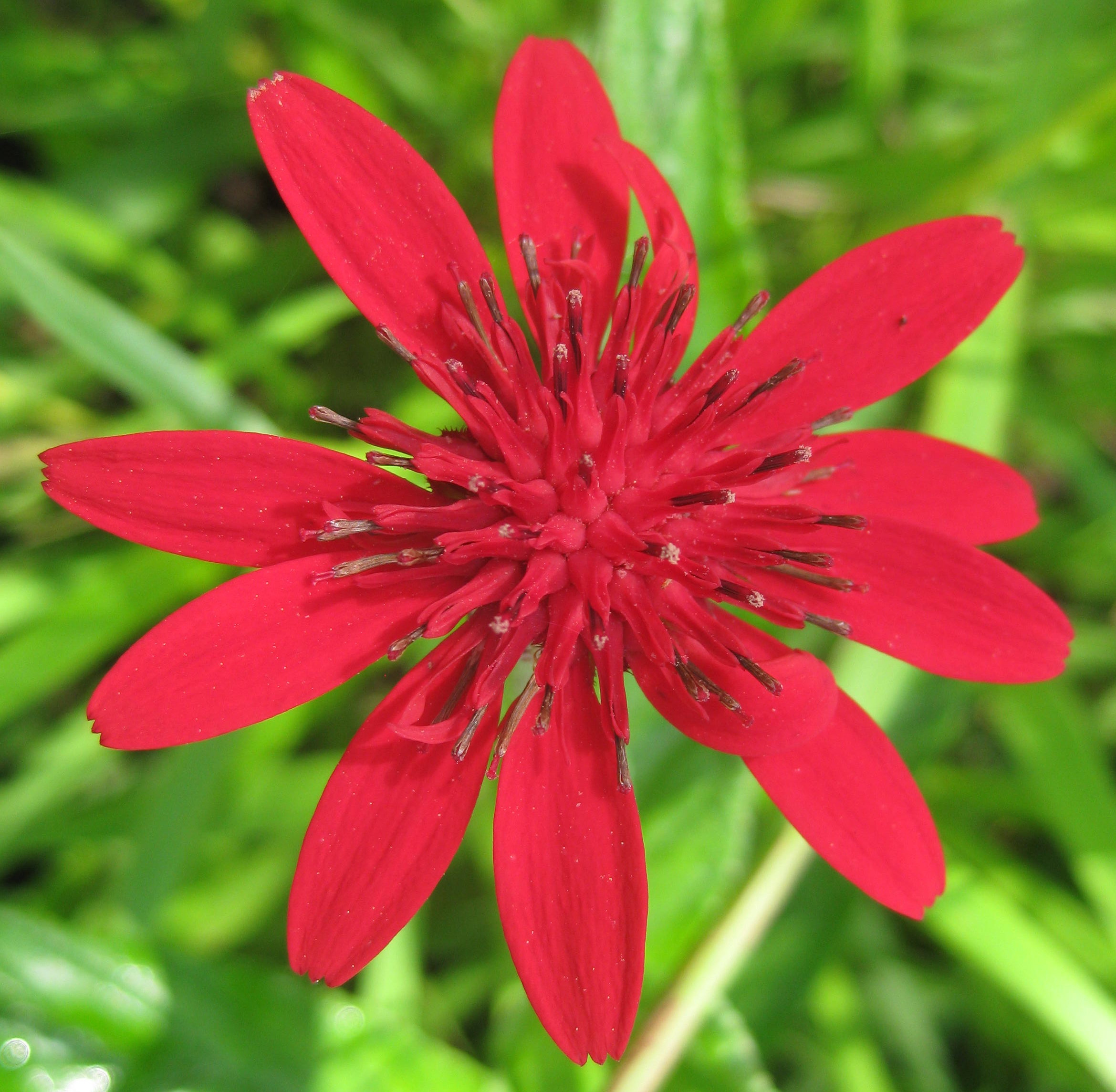
- Erythrocephalum zambesianum flower

Scientific classification
- Kingdom: Plantae
- Clade: Embryophytes
- Clade: Tracheophytes
- Clade: Angiosperms
- Clade: Eudicots
- Clade: Asterids
- Order: Asterales
- Family: Asteraceae
- Subfamily: Carduoideae
- Tribe: Dicomeae
- Genus: Erythrocephalum; Benth.

Synonyms
- Achyrothalamus O.Hoffm.

= Erythrocephalum =

Genus of flowering plants

Erythrocephalum is a genus of African flowering plants in the family Asteraceae.

Species

- Erythrocephalum caudatum S.Moore
- Erythrocephalum decipiens C.Jeffrey
- Erythrocephalum dianthiflorum (Welw.) O.Hoffm.
- Erythrocephalum dictyophlebium Wild
- Erythrocephalum foliosum (Klatt) O.Hoffm.
- Erythrocephalum goetzei O.Hoffm.
- Erythrocephalum jeffreyanum S.Ortiz & Rodr.Oubiña
- Erythrocephalum longifolium Benth. ex Oliv.
- Erythrocephalum marginatum (O.Hoffm.) S.Ortiz & A.P.Cout.
- Erythrocephalum microcephalum Dandy
- Erythrocephalum minus Oliv.
- Erythrocephalum plantaginifolium O.Hoffm.
- Erythrocephalum sallyae Beentje
- Erythrocephalum scabrifolium C.Jeffrey
- Erythrocephalum setulosum C.Jeffrey
