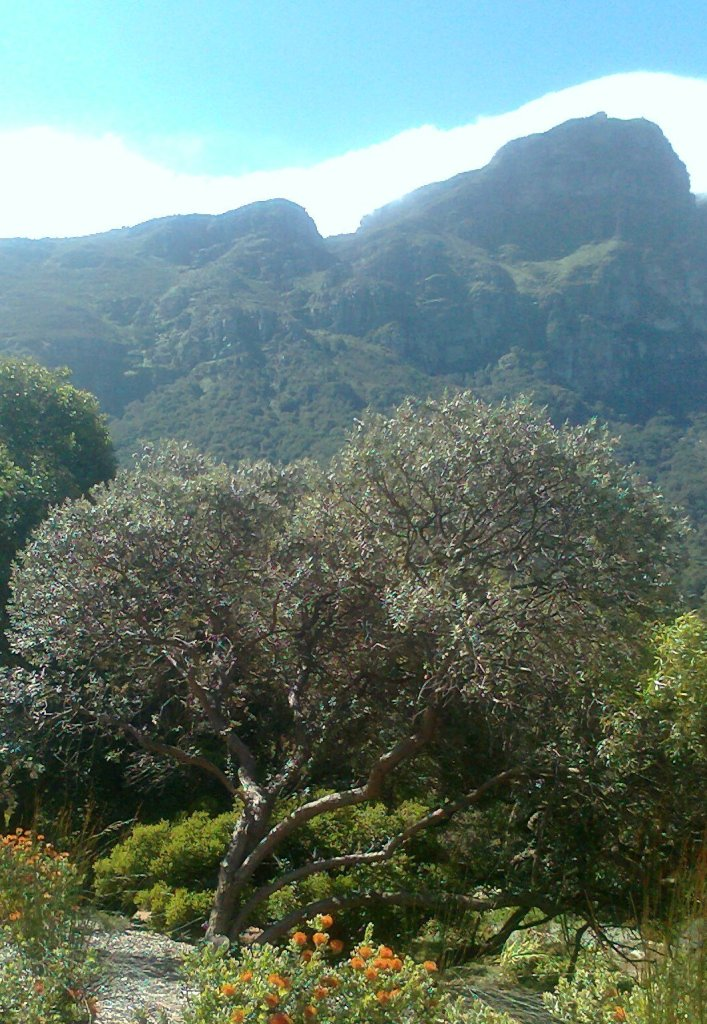

Conservation status
- Least Concern (IUCN 2.3)

Scientific classification
- Kingdom: Plantae
- Clade: Tracheophytes
- Clade: Angiosperms
- Clade: Eudicots
- Clade: Asterids
- Order: Asterales
- Family: Asteraceae
- Genus: Tarchonanthus
- Species: T. littoralis

Binomial name
- Tarchonanthus littoralis P.P.J.Herman

= Tarchonanthus littoralis =

Species of tree

Tarchonanthus littoralis, the coastal camphor bush, is a shrub to small tree that is part of the Asteraceae family. The species is endemic to South Africa and occurs along the coast in KwaZulu-Natal, the Eastern Cape and the Western Cape.

The leaves are grey-green with fine wrinkles on the upper surface, whitish and felt-like on the underside and smooth to finely toothed. When the leaves are crushed, they smell aromatic. The tree looks very much like the camphor bush.
