= Cloiselia =

Scientific classification
- Kingdom: Plantae
- Clade: Tracheophytes
- Clade: Angiosperms
- Clade: Eudicots
- Clade: Asterids
- Order: Asterales
- Family: Asteraceae
- Subfamily: Carduoideae
- Tribe: Dicomeae
- Genus: Cloiselia; S.Moore

Species
- See below

Genus of flowering plants

Cloiselia is a genus of flowering plants in the tribe Dicomeae within the family Asteraceae. It is endemic to Madagascar.

== Species ==
Accepted species include:

- Cloiselia carbonaria S.Moore
- Cloiselia humbertii S.Ortiz
- Cloiselia madagascariensis S.Ortiz
- Cloiselia oleifolia (Humbert) S.Ortiz
