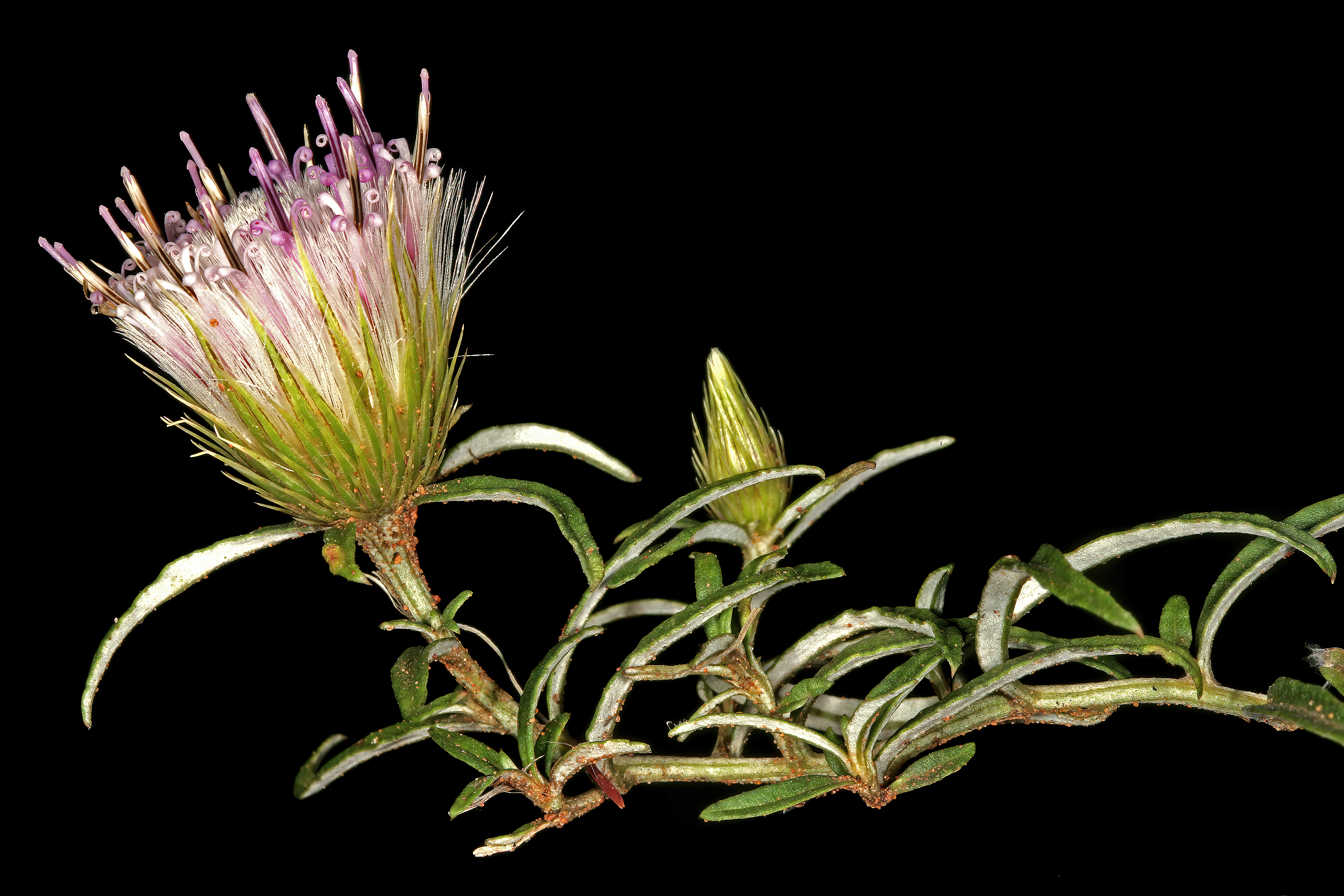
- Dicoma anomala subsp. anomala

Scientific classification
- Kingdom: Plantae
- Clade: Tracheophytes
- Clade: Angiosperms
- Clade: Eudicots
- Clade: Asterids
- Order: Asterales
- Family: Asteraceae
- Subfamily: Carduoideae
- Tribe: Dicomeae; Panero & V.A.Funk

Genera
- Cloiselia; Dicoma; Dicomopsis; Erythrocephalum; Gladiopappus; Macledium; Pasaccardoa; Pleiotaxis

= Dicomeae =

Tribe of flowering plants

Dicomeae is a tribe of flowering plants in the family Asteraceae, subfamily Carduoideae.

== Genera ==
Dicomeae genera recognized by the Global Compositae Database as of April 2023:

- Cloiselia S.Moore
- Dicoma Cass.
- Dicomopsis S.Ortiz
- Erythrocephalum Benth.
- Gladiopappus Humbert
- Macledium Cass.
- Pasaccardoa Kuntze
- Pleiotaxis Steetz
