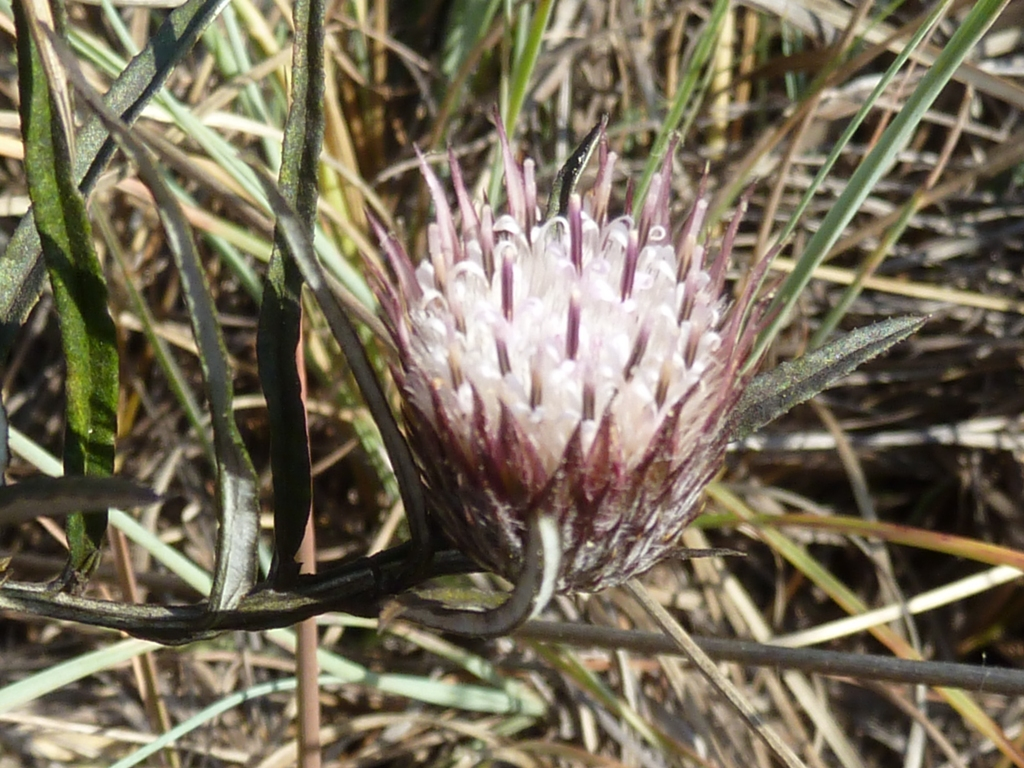
- Dicoma anomala

Scientific classification
- Kingdom: Plantae
- Clade: Tracheophytes
- Clade: Angiosperms
- Clade: Eudicots
- Clade: Asterids
- Order: Asterales
- Family: Asteraceae
- Subfamily: Carduoideae
- Tribe: Dicomeae
- Genus: Dicoma; Cass.

Synonyms
- Cryptostephane Sch.Bip.; Cullumiopsis Drake; Nitelium Cass.; Hochstetteria DC.; Tibestina Maire; Brachyachenium Baker; Cypselodontia DC.

= Dicoma =

Genus of flowering plants

Dicoma is a genus of flowering plants in the family Asteraceae. It's native to Africa and the Middle East.

== Species ==
As of April 2023, Plants of the World Online accepted the following species:

- Dicoma aethiopica S.Ortiz & Rodr.Oubiña
- Dicoma alemannii-mazzocchii Chiov.
- Dicoma anomala Sond.
- Dicoma antunesii O.Hoffm.
- Dicoma bangueolensis Buscal. & Muschl.
- Dicoma capensis Less.
- Dicoma chatanensis N.Kilian
- Dicoma cuneneensis Wild
- Dicoma dinteri S.Moore
- Dicoma elegans Welw. ex O.Hoffm.
- Dicoma foliosa O.Hoffm.
- Dicoma fruticosa Compton
- Dicoma galpinii F.C.Wilson
- Dicoma gillettii Rodr.Oubiña & S.Ortiz
- Dicoma hindiana S.Ortiz & Rodr.Oubiña
- Dicoma incana (Baker) O.Hoffm.
- Dicoma kurumanii S.Ortiz & Netnou
- Dicoma macrocephala DC.
- Dicoma montana Schweick.
- Dicoma nachtigalii O.Hoffm.
- Dicoma niccolifera Wild
- Dicoma obconica S.Ortiz
- Dicoma paivae S.Ortiz & Rodr.Oubiña
- Dicoma picta Druce
- Dicoma popeana S.Ortiz & Rodr.Oubiña
- Dicoma prostrata Schweick.
- Dicoma schimperi (DC.) Baill. ex O.Hoffm.
- Dicoma schinzii O.Hoffm.
- Dicoma scoparia Rodr.Oubiña & S.Ortiz
- Dicoma somalense S.Moore
- Dicoma squarrosa Wild
- Dicoma swazilandica S.Ortiz, Rodr.Oubiña & Pulgar
- Dicoma thuliniana S.Ortiz, Rodr.Oubiña & Mesfin
- Dicoma tomentosa Cass.

== See also ==
- Macledium
