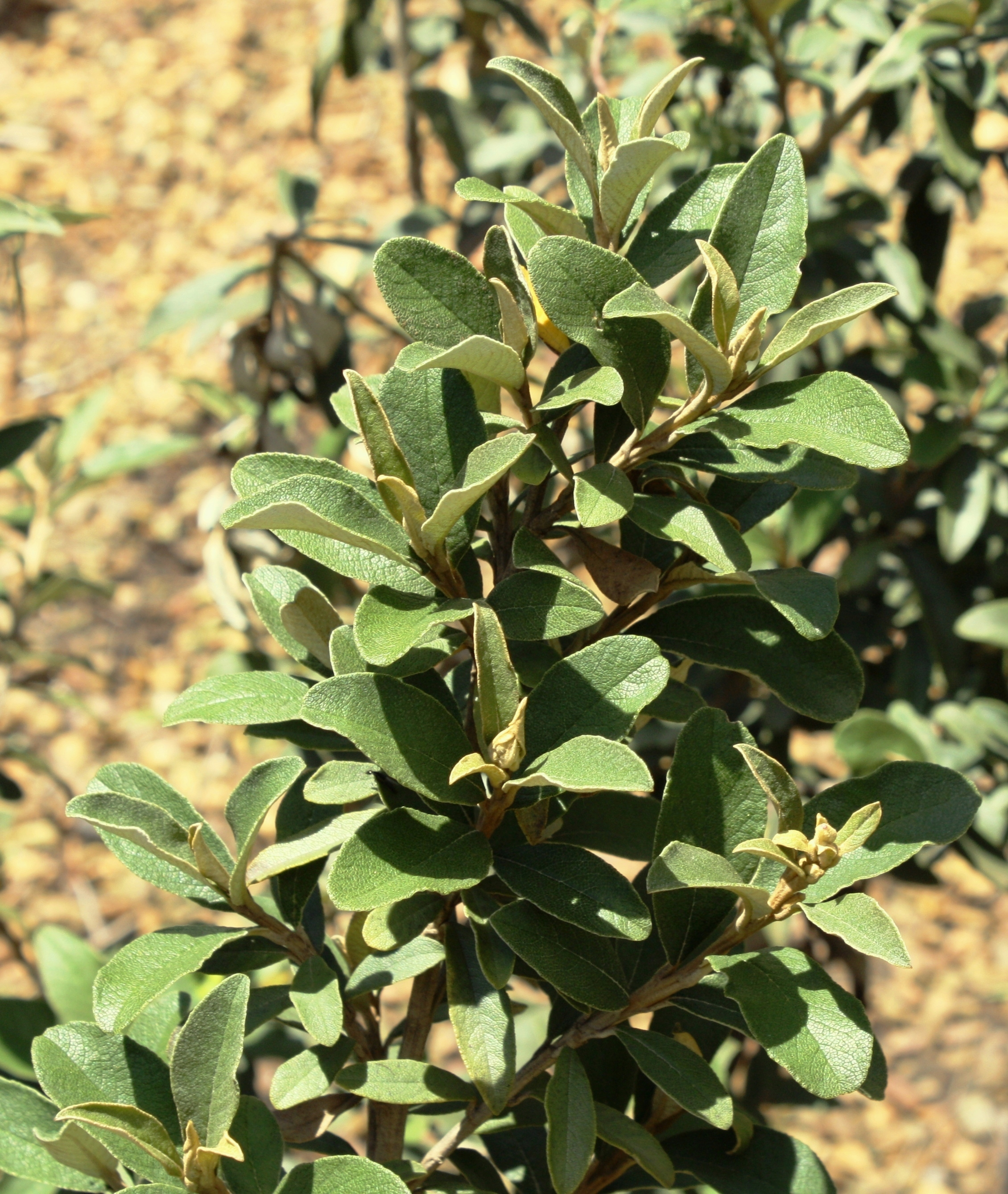
- Tarchonanthus camphoratus

Scientific classification
- Kingdom: Plantae
- Clade: Tracheophytes
- Clade: Angiosperms
- Clade: Eudicots
- Clade: Asterids
- Order: Asterales
- Family: Asteraceae
- Subfamily: Carduoideae
- Tribe: Tarchonantheae
- Genus: Tarchonanthus; L.

Type species
- Tarchonanthus camphoratus L.

= Tarchonanthus =

Genus of plants

Tarchonanthus is a genus of flowering plants in the daisy family.

Species

- Tarchonanthus camphoratus L. - Africa
- Tarchonanthus littoralis P.P.J.Herman - South Africa
- Tarchonanthus minor Less. - South Africa
- Tarchonanthus obovatus DC. - South Africa
- Tarchonanthus parvicapitulatus P.P.J.Herman - South Africa
- Tarchonanthus trilobus DC. - South Africa
