= Gladiopappus =

Scientific classification
- Kingdom: Plantae
- Clade: Embryophytes
- Clade: Tracheophytes
- Clade: Angiosperms
- Clade: Eudicots
- Clade: Asterids
- Order: Asterales
- Family: Asteraceae
- Subfamily: Carduoideae
- Tribe: Dicomeae
- Genus: Gladiopappus; Humbert
- Species: G. vernonioides

Binomial name
- Gladiopappus vernonioides Humbert

Genus of flowering plants

Gladiopappus is a genus of flowering plants in the family Asteraceae.

Species

There is only one known species, Gladiopappus vernonioides, endemic to Madagascar.
