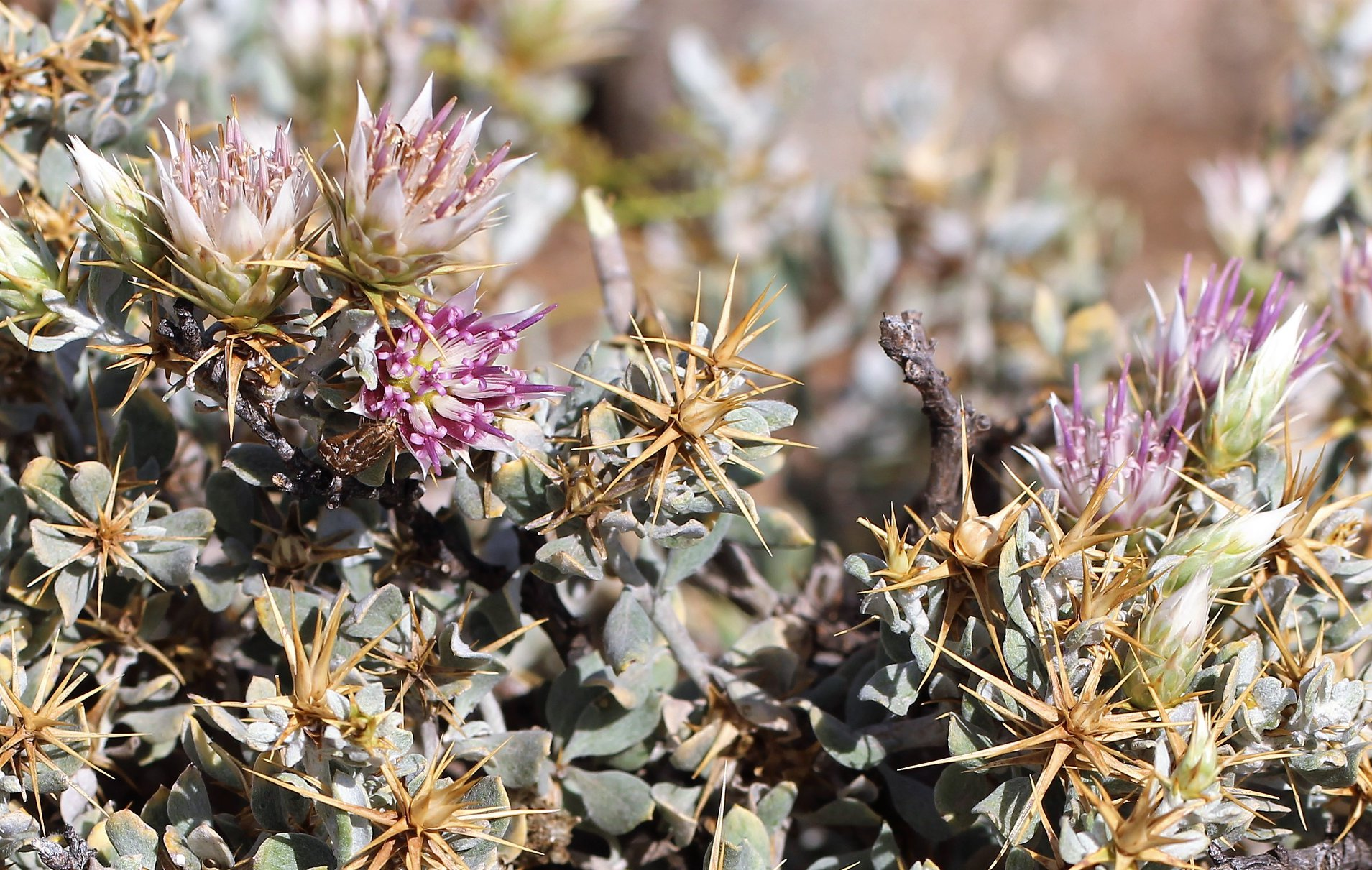

Scientific classification
- Kingdom: Plantae
- Clade: Tracheophytes
- Clade: Angiosperms
- Clade: Eudicots
- Clade: Asterids
- Order: Asterales
- Family: Asteraceae
- Genus: Macledium
- Species: M. spinosum

Binomial name
- Macledium spinosum (L.) S.Ortíz

Synonyms
- Dicoma spinosa (L.) Druce.

= Macledium spinosum =

Species of flowering plant

Macledium spinosum is a variable species of flowering plant in the family Asteraceae, that is endemic to the southern Cape regions of South Africa.

== Description ==
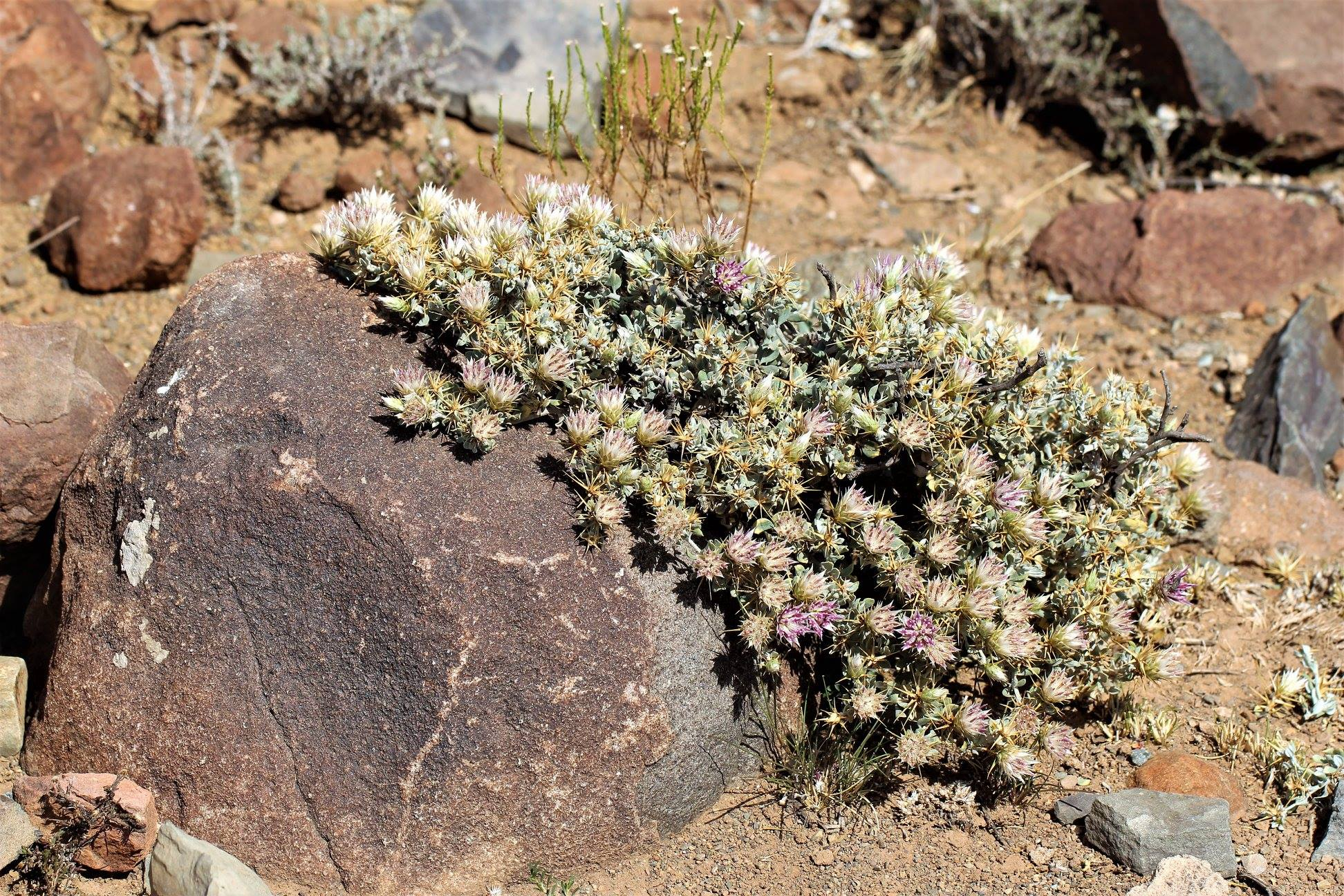
Macledium spinosum in habitat

A low, compact, spreading shrub, reaching a maximum of 50 cm in height. The leaves are small (15 x 5mm), spiny, with a grey, velvet leaf-surface.

The wide (20 mm) protea-like flowerheads appear in Spring and Summer, and range in colour from white to purple.

=== Related species ===
A closely related species, Macledium relhanioides, occurs in similar areas in the western Little Karoo and Overberg, but tends to be confined to quartzitic outcrops and quartz-fields.

Macledium relhanioides differs by having longer leaves (20 mm) and smaller flowerheads (10 mm) that have prominent pink, spiny bracts (but only rudimentary ray-florets).

== Distribution and habitat ==
This species can be found from Worcester in the west, eastwards through the Little Karoo and Overberg regions, as far east as Somerset East.

It is most common in clay-rich, shale-derived soils, in Renosterveld and Succulent Karoo vegetation types.
