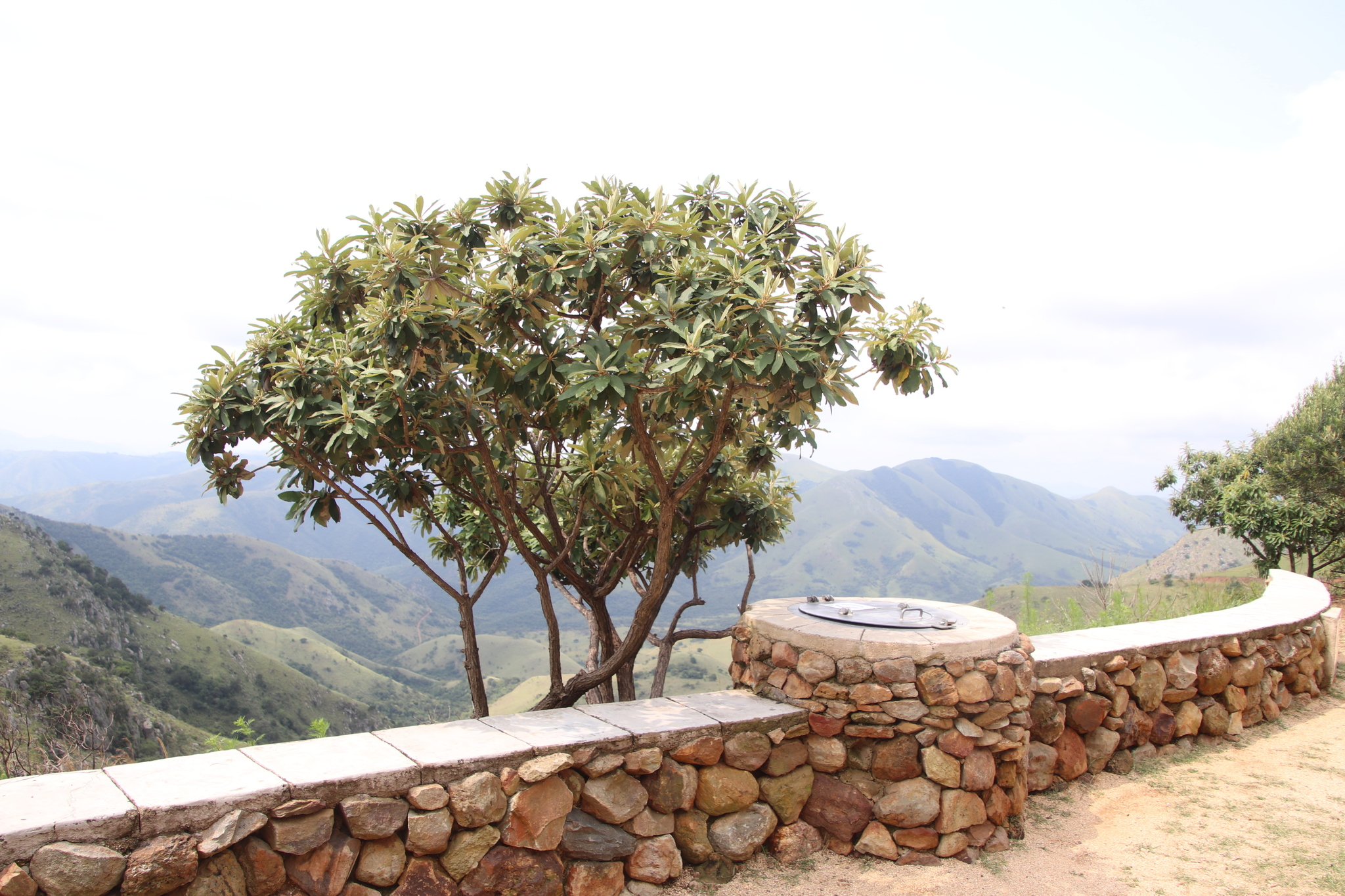

Conservation status
- Least Concern (IUCN 2.3)

Scientific classification
- Kingdom: Plantae
- Clade: Tracheophytes
- Clade: Angiosperms
- Clade: Eudicots
- Clade: Asterids
- Order: Asterales
- Family: Asteraceae
- Genus: Tarchonanthus
- Species: T. trilobus

Binomial name
- Tarchonanthus trilobus DC.

= Tarchonanthus trilobus =

Species of tree

Tarchonanthus trilobus, the three-toothed camphor bush is a tree in the Asteraceae family. The species is native to Eswatini, Mozambique, South Africa and Zimbabwe. In South Africa, it is found in KwaZulu-Natal and the Eastern Cape.

The tree grows in bushveld, usually on rocky places and in dry forest. The leaves are thick, leathery, dark green, coarsely grooved on the upper surface and whitish on the lower surface. There are two varieties, one with leaf tips that have three teeth and the other with rolled leaf tips.
