= Pleiotaxis =

Scientific classification
- Kingdom: Plantae
- Clade: Tracheophytes
- Clade: Angiosperms
- Clade: Eudicots
- Clade: Asterids
- Order: Asterales
- Family: Asteraceae
- Subfamily: Carduoideae
- Tribe: Dicomeae
- Genus: Pleiotaxis; Steetz

Type species
- Pleiotaxis pulcherrima Steetz

Genus of plants

Pleiotaxis is a genus of African plants in the family Asteraceae.

Species

- Pleiotaxis affinis
- Pleiotaxis ambigua
- Pleiotaxis angolensis
- Pleiotaxis angusterugosa
- Pleiotaxis antunesii
- Pleiotaxis bampsiana
- Pleiotaxis chlorolepis
- Pleiotaxis decipiens
- Pleiotaxis dewevrei
- Pleiotaxis duvigneaudii
- Pleiotaxis eximia
- Pleiotaxis fulva
- Pleiotaxis gombensis
- Pleiotaxis huillensis
- Pleiotaxis jeffreyana
- Pleiotaxis lawalreana
- Pleiotaxis lejolyana
- Pleiotaxis linearifolia
- Pleiotaxis macrophylla
- Pleiotaxis newtonii
- Pleiotaxis overlaetii
- Pleiotaxis oxylepis
- Pleiotaxis paucinervia
- Pleiotaxis perfoliata
- Pleiotaxis petitiana
- Pleiotaxis pulcherrima
- Pleiotaxis racemosa
- Pleiotaxis robynsiana
- Pleiotaxis rogersii
- Pleiotaxis rugosa
- Pleiotaxis selina
- Pleiotaxis subpaniculata
- Pleiotaxis subscaposa
- Pleiotaxis upembensis
- Pleiotaxis welwitschii
