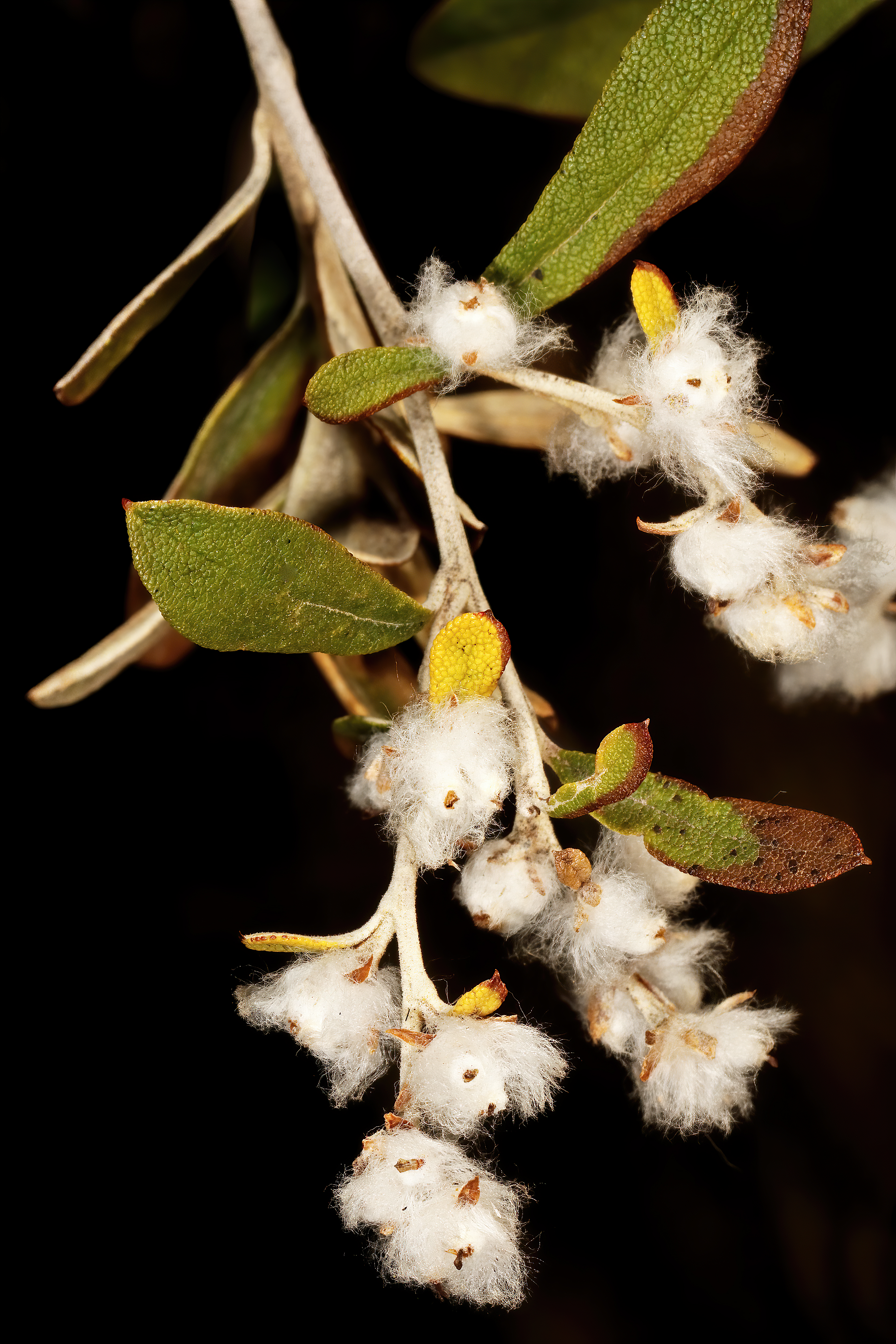

Conservation status
- Least Concern (IUCN 2.3)

Scientific classification
- Kingdom: Plantae
- Clade: Tracheophytes
- Clade: Angiosperms
- Clade: Eudicots
- Clade: Asterids
- Order: Asterales
- Family: Asteraceae
- Genus: Tarchonanthus
- Species: T. parvicapitulatus

Binomial name
- Tarchonanthus parvicapitulatus P.P.J.Herman

= Tarchonanthus parvicapitulatus =

Species of tree

Tarchonanthus parvicapitulatus is a shrub to small tree in the Asteraceae family. The species is found in South Africa, Namibia, Eswatini and Zimbabwe.
