= Tarchonanthus obovatus =

Conservation status
- Least Concern (IUCN 3.1)

Scientific classification
- Kingdom: Plantae
- Clade: Tracheophytes
- Clade: Angiosperms
- Clade: Eudicots
- Clade: Asterids
- Order: Asterales
- Family: Asteraceae
- Genus: Tarchonanthus
- Species: T. obovatus

Binomial name
- Tarchonanthus obovatus DC.

Species of tree

Tarchonanthus obovatus is a shrub part of the Asteraceae family. It is endemic to South Africa.
