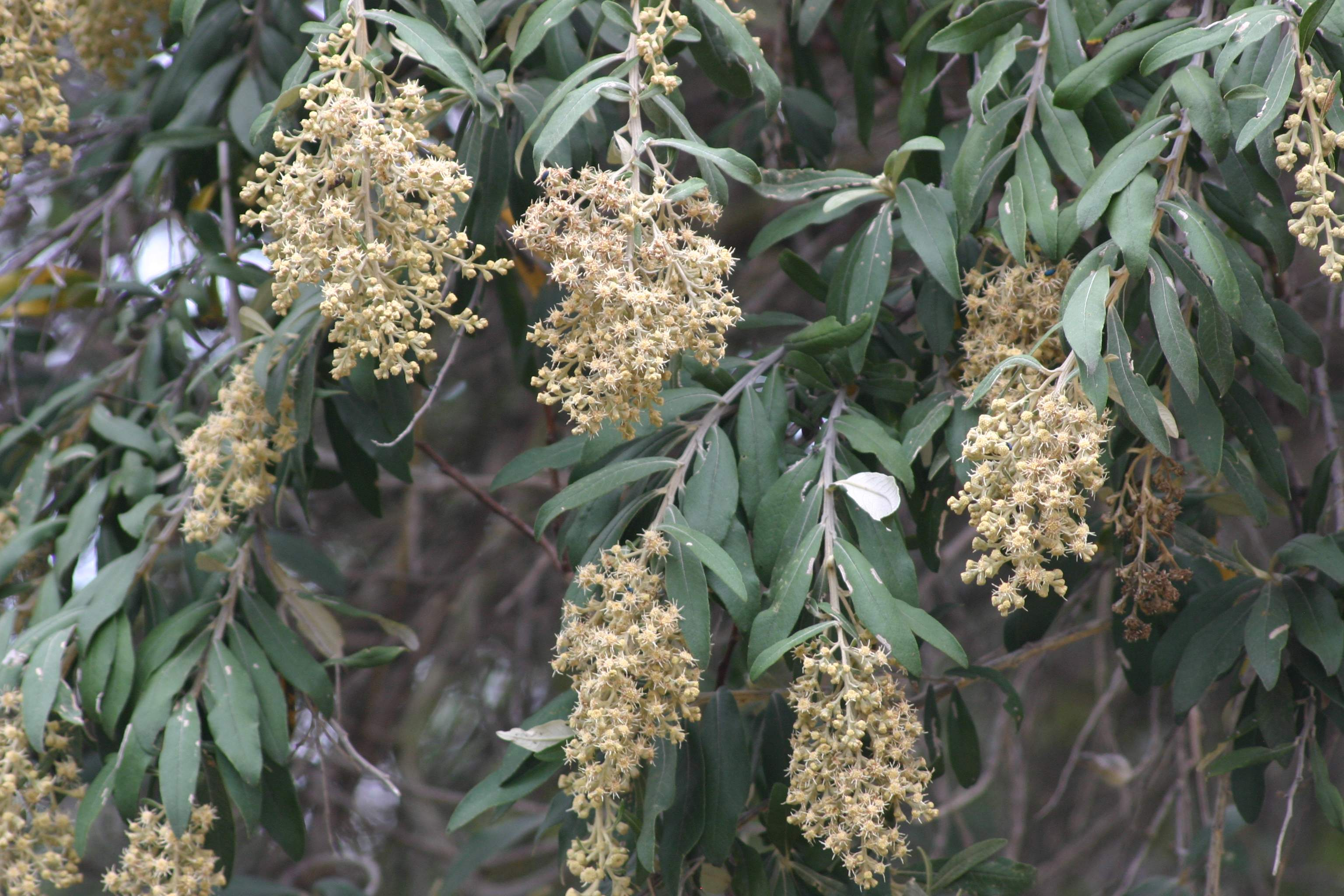
- Foliage and flower heads at Nature's Valley in South Africa
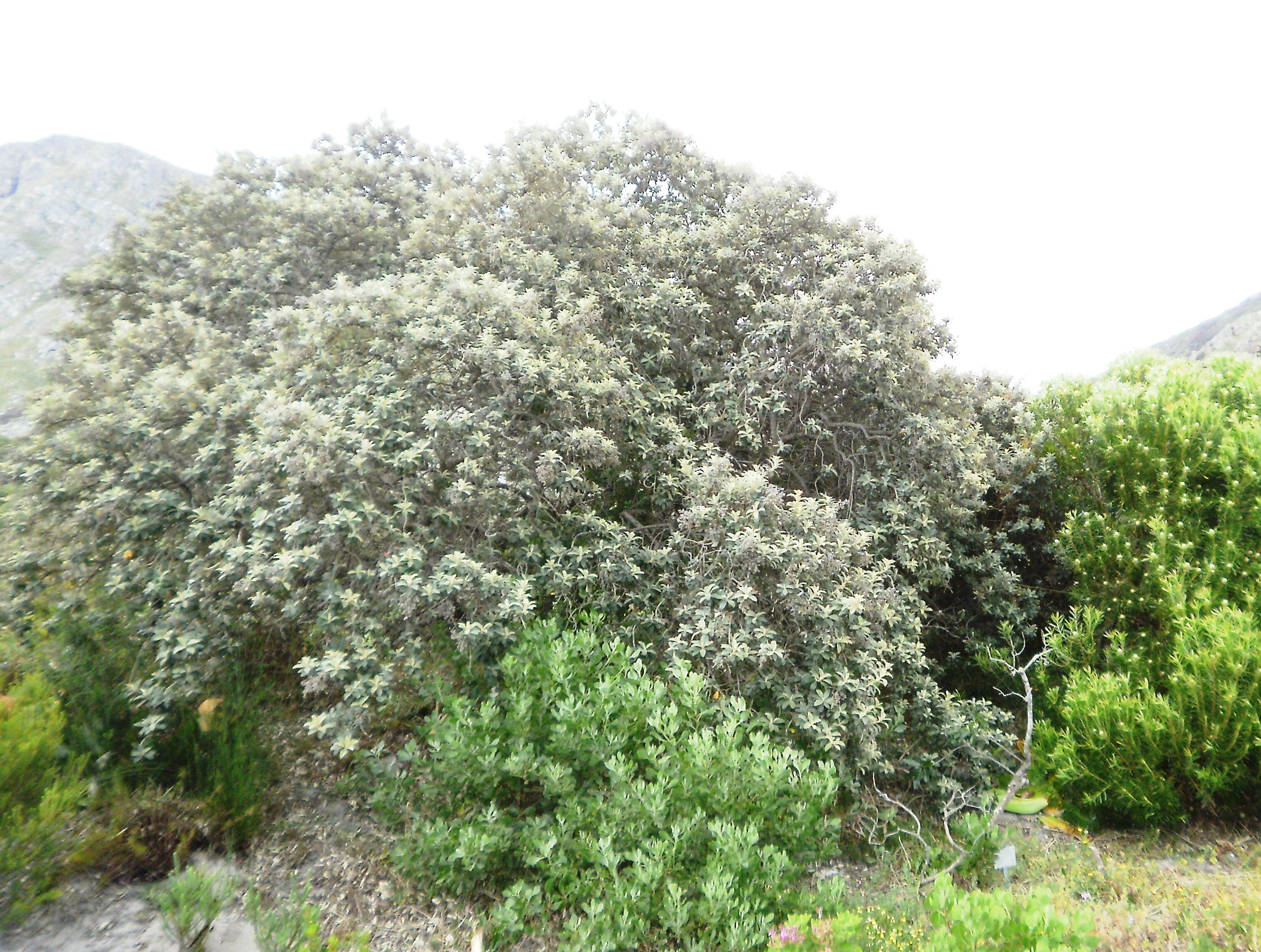
- Habit in the Strandveld, South Africa

Conservation status
- Least Concern (IUCN 3.1)

Scientific classification
- Kingdom: Plantae
- Clade: Tracheophytes
- Clade: Angiosperms
- Clade: Eudicots
- Clade: Asterids
- Order: Asterales
- Family: Asteraceae
- Genus: Tarchonanthus
- Species: T. camphoratus

Binomial name
- Tarchonanthus camphoratus L.

Synonyms
- Tarchonanthus abyssinicus Sch.Bip.; Tarchonanthus litakunensis DC.; Tarchonanthus procerus Salisb.

= Tarchonanthus camphoratus =

Camphor bush

Species of tree

Tarchonanthus camphoratus (known as camphor bush for its scent, or leleshwa in Kenya), is a shrub or small tree which is widespread in Africa south of the Sahel, and in Yemen.

== Description ==
The camphor bush can reach up to 6 meters in height. The twigs and younger stems are white-felted, as are the undersides of the leaves. The upper leaf surface is dark olive-green. Bruised leaves smell strongly of camphor. Tarchonanthus camphoratus is dioecious. Flowers are usually present from December to May (in South Africa), with cream coloured panicles on a discoid head. Male flowering heads have several flowers whilst the female has only a few. The fruit is a dense and woolly achene.

== Cultivation and uses ==
Tarchonanthus camphoratus wood is fragrant, close-grained, attractive, durable and rich in aromatic oils. It is used as wood fuel and a source of charcoal. It is also used as a traditional building material, in horticulture, and in tribal papermaking. Leleshwa is also a source of aromatic oils used as fragrances. Its leaves are used by the Maasai to scent their homes and persons.

== Medicinal use ==
Tarchonanthus camphoratus is used as a traditional remedy for respiratory illnesses. The species has wide range of local uses, including dental hygiene.

== Gallery ==
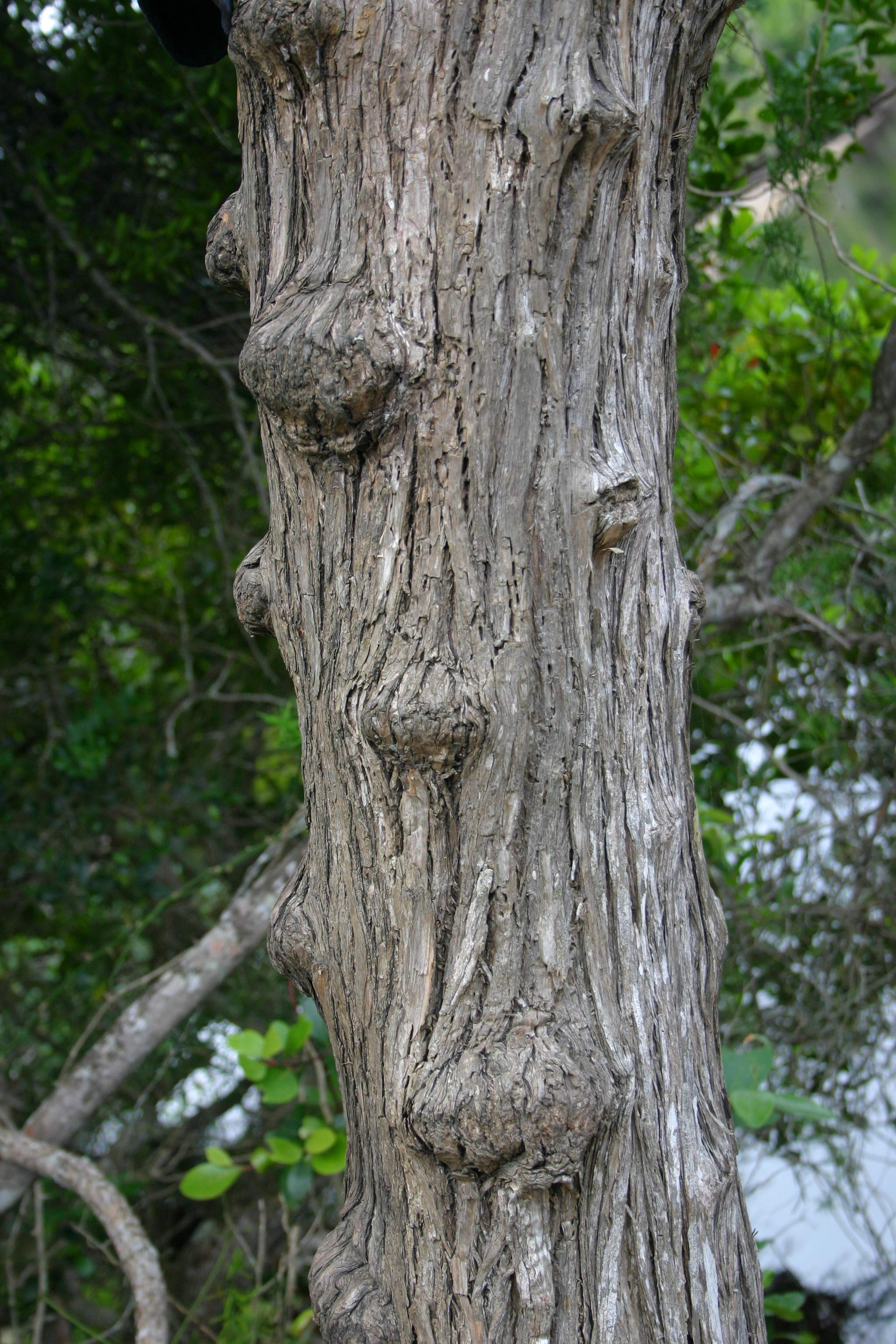
Trunk and bark

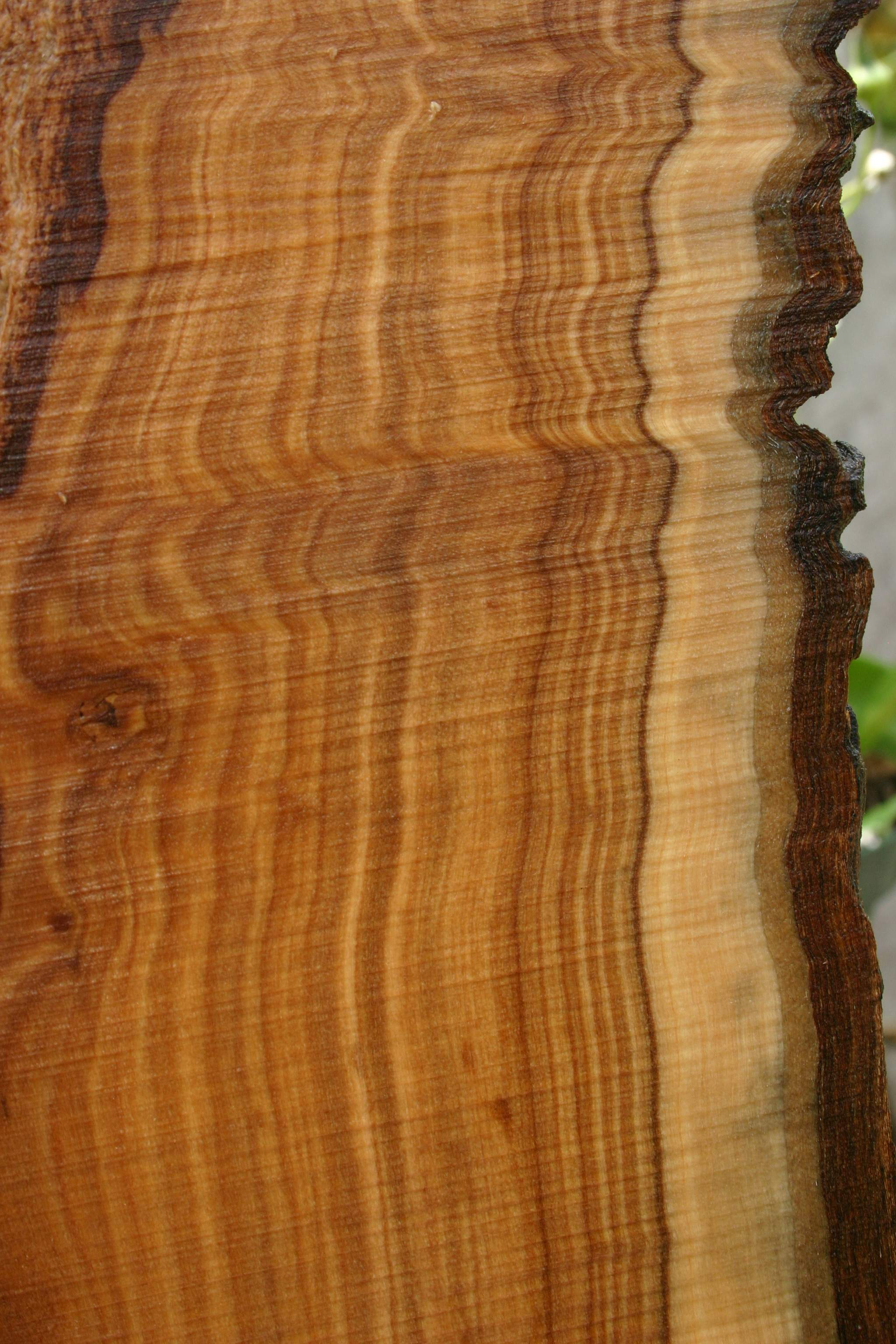
Wood
