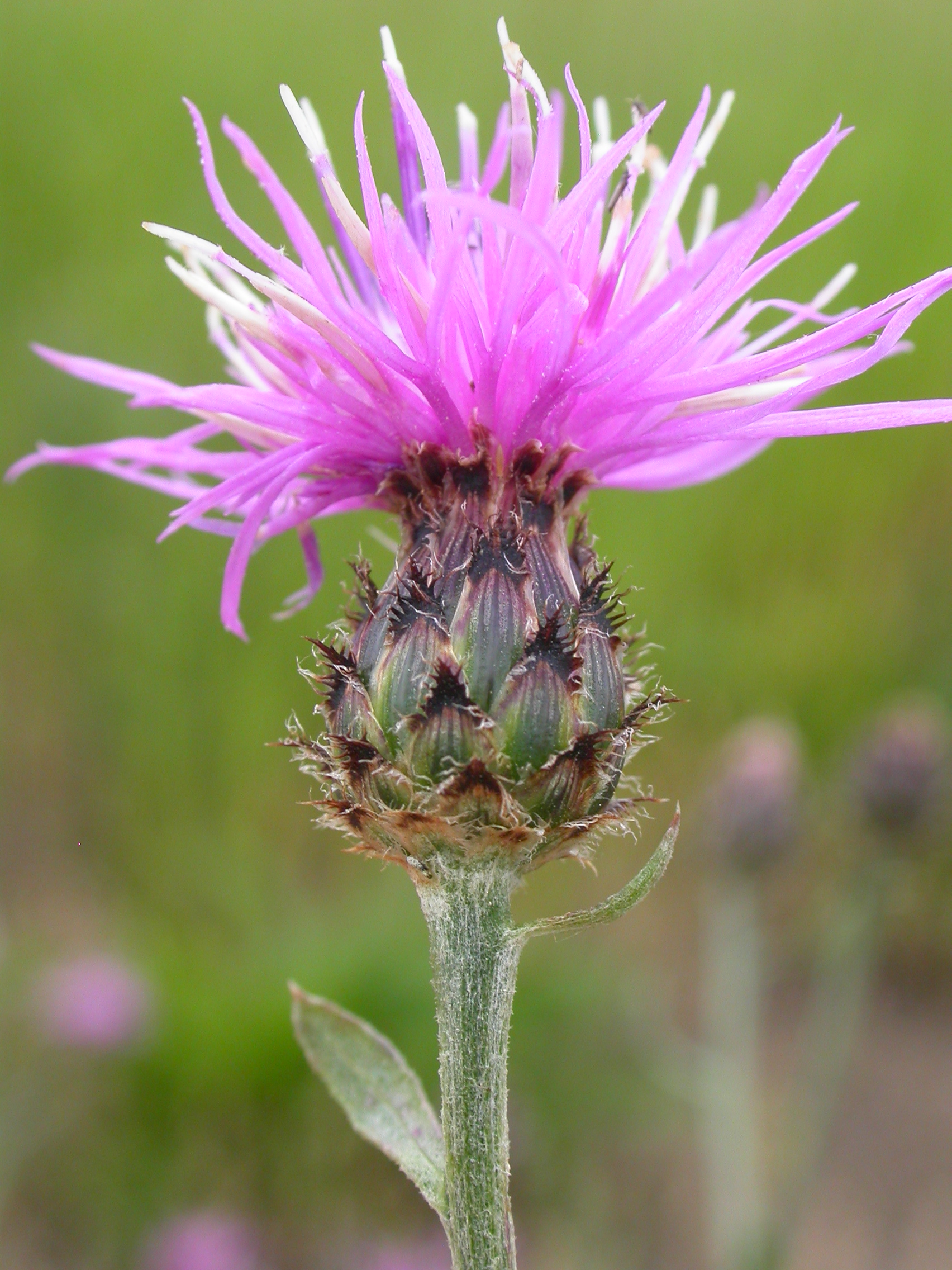
- Centaurea stoebe

Scientific classification
- Kingdom: Plantae
- Clade: Embryophytes
- Clade: Tracheophytes
- Clade: Angiosperms
- Clade: Eudicots
- Clade: Asterids
- Order: Asterales
- Family: Asteraceae
- Subfamily: Carduoideae (Sweet) Cass.

Tribes
- Cardueae; Dicomeae; Oldenburgieae; Tarchonantheae

= Carduoideae =

Subfamily of flowering plants

Carduoideae is the thistle subfamily of the Asteraceae, or sunflower family, of flowering plants. It comprises a number of tribes in various circumscriptions of the family, in addition to the Cardueae.

Takhtajan, according to Reveal, includes 11 tribes in addition to the Cardueae: the Arctotideae, the Barnadesieae, the Carlineae, the Cichorieae, the Echinopseae, the Eremothamneae, the Gundelieae, the Liabeae, the Mutisieae, and the Vernonieae.

Of these 12, Thorne agrees with seven in his eight-tribe taxonomy of the Carduoideae, placing the tribes Cardueae (Cynareae), plus Arctotideae, Cichorieae, Eremothamneae, Liabeae, Mutisieae, and Vernonieaes in the subfamily, plus the Tarchonantheae.

The Panero and Funk classification of 2002 (a molecular phylogenetic classification based upon chloroplast genes) places just three tribes in the subfamily: the Cardueae, plus the Dicomeae (created by Panero and Funk's paper, consisting of Dicoma, Erythrocephalum, Gladiopappus, Macledium, Cloiselia, Pasaccardoa, and Pleiotaxis), and the Tarchonantheae (Tarchonanthus plus Brachylaena). The genus Oldenburgia may be within this subfamily but the data on this is inconclusive.

The Takhtajan system divides the Asteraceae into only two subfamilies, the Asteroideae in addition to the Carduoideae, while Thorne adds the basal, monophyletic subfamily, the Barnadesioideae. The recent phylogeny of Panero and Funk divides the Asteraceae into 11 subfamilies.
