= Suburban Conference (Wisconsin) =

Wisconsin high school athletic conference (1925-1985)

The Suburban Conference is a former high school athletic conference in Wisconsin, operating from 1925 to 1985 with its membership concentrated in the suburbs of Milwaukee. Its member schools were aligned with the Wisconsin Interscholastic Athletic Association.

== History ==
=== 1925–1942 ===
Location of Original Suburban Conference Members

The Suburban Conference, originally known as the Milwaukee Suburban Interscholastic Athletic Association, was formed in 1925 by seven high schools located in the streetcar suburbs of Milwaukee: Cudahy, Milwaukee County Agricultural, Shorewood, South Milwaukee, Waukesha, Wauwatosa and West Allis. It was the second athletic conference to form in the Milwaukee area, preceded only by the Milwaukee City Conference in 1893. Milwaukee County School of Agriculture left the conference when it closed in 1928, and its place was taken by the newly opened high school in West Milwaukee in 1929. Whitefish Bay joined the conference in 1933, and their entry into the Suburban Conference brought the membership group to the maximum number of eight schools per the conference's original constitution.

=== 1942–1980 ===
Location of Suburban Conference Members (1974-1980)

The growth of the Suburban Conference coincided with population growth in the Milwaukee area. West Allis added a second high school in 1939 when Nathan Hale High School added senior high school grades, and they joined the conference in 1942. West Allis High School changed their name to West Allis Central in the process. Nathan Hale's entry brought the number of member schools in the conference to nine, breaking the 1925 constitutional limit on the number of members. An odd number of schools also created scheduling issues that led the conference to explore adding a tenth member in the early 1950s. After making unsuccessful overtures to Oconomowoc High School to leave the Little Ten Conference, the Suburban Conference extended an invite to the recently opened Greendale High School, and they joined in 1952. Port Washington and Watertown were also reported as candidates for expansion but instead formed half of the new Braveland Conference (along with Cedarburg and Menomonee Falls of the disbanded 4-C Conference) in 1953. Wauwatosa West High School joined the conference soon after it opened in 1961, with Wauwatosa High School becoming Wauwatosa East. They replaced Greendale, who left to join the Braveland Conference for two years before becoming a charter member of the Parkland Conference. A conference realignment plan that merged the Suburban and Braveland Conferences was also discussed that year but never implemented. 1974 brought an eleventh member to the conference in the form of the newly opened Waukesha North High School, and Waukesha High School changed its name to Waukesha South.

=== 1980–1985 ===
Location of Final Suburban Conference Members

After years of discussion between the high school athletic conferences in southeastern Wisconsin, the WIAA stepped in with a sweeping realignment plan in 1980. Five new schools joined the Suburban: four of the smaller schools from the Milwaukee City Conference (Juneau, Riverside, Rufus King and West Division) and Racine Horlick from the former South Shore Conference. Most sports competed as a single division of sixteen schools with the exception of football, which was partitioned into large-school and small-school divisions:

Football-Only Alignment
Large Schools	Small Schools
Cudahy	Milwaukee Juneau
Nathan Hale	Milwaukee Riverside
Racine Horlick	Milwaukee Rufus King
South Milwaukee	Milwaukee West Division
Waukesha North	Shorewood
Waukesha South	West Milwaukee
Wauwatosa East	
Wauwatosa West	
West Allis Central	
Whitefish Bay	

Wauwatosa West and Whitefish Bay were moved over to the small-school division for football in 1982, bringing each division to eight schools. In 1983, Racine Case joined from the Parkland Conference and Racine Park joined from the Milwaukee Area Conference, reuniting the three high schools of the Racine Unified School District. For the last two years of the Suburban Conference's existence, it was aligned into two divisions for most sports based on enrollment size: the Gold Division contained larger schools and the Blue Division contained the smaller ones:

Gold Division	Blue Division
Milwaukee Juneau	Cudahy
Milwaukee Rufus King	Milwaukee Riverside
Racine Case	Milwaukee West Division
Racine Horlick	Nathan Hale
Racine Park	Shorewood
Waukesha North	South Milwaukee
Waukesha South	West Allis Central
Wauwatosa East	West Milwaukee
Wauwatosa West	Whitefish Bay

Racine Case and Racine Park joined the large-schools division for football, and they would remain there for the final two seasons of conference play.

=== Epilogue ===
The Suburban Conference was realigned out of existence in 1985, with most of its members joining three newly formed conferences in southeastern Wisconsin (the Big Nine, North Shore and Suburban Park conferences). The two Waukesha high schools joined an overhauled Braveland Conference, the four Milwaukee high schools rejoined the City Conference, and West Milwaukee joined the Parkland Conference (where it would remain until it closed in 1992).

== Conference membership history ==
=== Final members ===
School	Location	Affiliation	Mascot	Colors	Joined	Left	Conference Joined	Current Conference
Cudahy	Cudahy, WI	Public	Packers		1925	1985	Suburban Park	Woodland
Milwaukee Juneau	Milwaukee, WI	Public	Pioneers		1980	1985	Milwaukee City	
Milwaukee Riverside	Milwaukee, WI	Public	Tigers		1980	1985	Milwaukee City	
Milwaukee Rufus King	Milwaukee, WI	Public	Generals		1980	1985	Milwaukee City	
Milwaukee West Division (Note: Currently known as Milwaukee High School of the Arts)	Milwaukee, WI	Public	Redmen		1980	1985	Milwaukee City	
Nathan Hale	West Allis, WI	Public	Huskies		1942	1985	Suburban Park	Greater Metro
Racine Case	Racine, WI	Public	Eagles		1983	1985	Big Nine	Southeast
Racine Horlick	Racine, WI	Public	Rebels		1980	1985	Big Nine	Southeast
Racine Park	Racine, WI	Public	Panthers		1983	1985	Big Nine	Southeast
Shorewood	Shorewood, WI	Public	Greyhounds		1925	1985	North Shore	Woodland
South Milwaukee	South Milwaukee, WI	Public	Rockets		1925	1985	Suburban Park	Woodland
Waukesha North	Waukesha, WI	Public	Northstars		1974	1985	Braveland	Woodland
Waukesha South (Note: Known as Waukesha High School prior to 1974)	Waukesha, WI	Public	Blackshirts		1925	1985	Braveland	Woodland
Wauwatosa East (Note: Known as Wauwatosa High School prior to 1961)	Wauwatosa, WI	Public	Red Raiders		1925	1985	North Shore	Greater Metro
Wauwatosa West	Wauwatosa, WI	Public	Trojans		1961	1985	North Shore	Greater Metro
West Allis Central (Note: Known as West Allis High School prior to 1941)	West Allis, WI	Public	Bulldogs		1925	1985	Suburban Park	Woodland
West Milwaukee	West Milwaukee, WI	Public	Mustangs		1929	1985	Parkland	Closed 1992
Whitefish Bay	Whitefish Bay, WI	Public	Blue Dukes		1933	1985	North Shore	

=== Previous members ===
School	Location	Affiliation	Mascot	Colors	Joined	Left	Conference Joined	Current Conference
Greendale	Greendale, WI	Public	Panthers		1952	1961	Braveland	Woodland
Milwaukee County School of Agriculture	Wauwatosa, WI	Public	Aggies		1925	1928	Closed	

== Membership timeline ==
Blue Division Gold Division

== List of state champions ==
=== Fall sports ===
Boys Cross Country
School	Year	Division
West Allis	1934	Single Division
South Milwaukee	1937	Single Division
South Milwaukee	1938	Single Division
South Milwaukee	1939	Single Division
South Milwaukee	1940	Single Division
South Milwaukee	1941	Single Division
Wauwatosa	1946	Single Division
South Milwaukee	1949	Small Schools
South Milwaukee	1950	Small Schools
South Milwaukee	1951	Small Schools
South Milwaukee	1952	Small Schools
Wauwatosa	1953	Large Schools
Wauwatosa	1954	Large Schools
Whitefish Bay	1955	Small Schools
Waukesha	1956	Large Schools
Whitefish Bay	1957	Medium Schools
West Allis Central	1958	Large Schools
Whitefish Bay	1961	Medium Schools
Whitefish Bay	1962	Medium Schools
South Milwaukee	1965	Medium Schools
Nathan Hale	1968	Large Schools

Girls Cross Country
School	Year	Division
West Allis Central	1977	Single Division

Boys Soccer
School	Year	Division
Whitefish Bay	1982	Single Division
Whitefish Bay	1983	Single Division

Girls Tennis
School	Year	Division
Whitefish Bay	1971	Single Division
Wauwatosa West	1972	Single Division
Wauwatosa West	1973	Single Division
Whitefish Bay	1974	Single Division
Whitefish Bay	1979	Single Division

Boys Volleyball
School	Year	Division
Waukesha	1951	Single Division
Waukesha	1952	Single Division
Waukesha	1953	Single Division
Waukesha	1955	Single Division
Waukesha	1957	Single Division
Waukesha	1958	Single Division
Waukesha	1959	Single Division
Waukesha	1960	Single Division
Waukesha	1961	Single Division
Wauwatosa West	1964	Single Division
Whitefish Bay	1966	Single Division
Whitefish Bay	1973	Single Division
South Milwaukee	1974	Single Division
Nathan Hale	1975	Single Division
Nathan Hale	1976	Single Division
Nathan Hale	1979	Single Division
Waukesha South	1981	Single Division

Girls Volleyball
School	Year	Division
Wauwatosa East	1974	Class A
Wauwatosa East	1975	Class A
Nathan Hale	1976	Class A
Nathan Hale	1979	Class A
Wauwatosa East	1980	Class A
West Milwaukee	1980	Class B
Wauwatosa East	1985	Class A

=== Winter sports ===
Boys Basketball
School	Year	Division
Shorewood	1942	Single Division
Waukesha	1944	Single Division
Wauwatosa	1948	Single Division
South Milwaukee	1952	Single Division
South Milwaukee	1976	Class A

Girls Basketball
School	Year	Division
Wauwatosa East	1981	Class A

Boys Swimming & Diving
School	Year	Division
West Allis	1926	Single Division
West Milwaukee	1932	Single Division
Shorewood	1933	Single Division
Shorewood	1935	Single Division
Shorewood	1936	Single Division
Shorewood	1937	Single Division
Shorewood	1938	Single Division
Shorewood	1939	Single Division
Wauwatosa	1940	Single Division
Shorewood	1941	Single Division
Shorewood	1942	Single Division
Shorewood	1943	Single Division
Wauwatosa	1944	Single Division
Wauwatosa	1945	Single Division
Wauwatosa	1946	Single Division
Wauwatosa	1947	Single Division
Waukesha	1948	Single Division
Wauwatosa	1949	Single Division
Wauwatosa	1950	Single Division
Wauwatosa	1951	Single Division
Whitefish Bay	1953	Single Division
Whitefish Bay	1954	Single Division
Wauwatosa	1956	Single Division
Whitefish Bay	1957	Single Division
Waukesha	1958	Single Division
Waukesha	1959	Single Division
Waukesha	1960	Single Division
Waukesha	1962	Single Division
Waukesha	1964	Single Division
Waukesha	1965	Single Division
Waukesha	1966	Single Division
Waukesha	1967	Single Division
Waukesha	1968	Single Division
Waukesha	1969	Single Division
Waukesha	1970	Single Division
Wauwatosa West	1971	Single Division
Waukesha	1972	Single Division
Waukesha	1973	Single Division
Waukesha	1974	Single Division

Boys Wrestling
School	Year	Division
West Milwaukee	1948	Single Division
Waukesha South	1980	Class A

=== Spring sports ===
Boys Golf
School	Year	Division
South Milwaukee	1926	Single Division
South Milwaukee	1927	Single Division
Wauwatosa	1937	Single Division
Nathan Hale	1942	Single Division
Wauwatosa	1946	Single Division
Wauwatosa	1954	Single Division
Whitefish Bay	1979	Single Division

Girls Soccer
School	Year	Division
Whitefish Bay	1983	Single Division
Whitefish Bay	1984	Single Division
Whitefish Bay	1985	Single Division

Boys Tennis
School	Year	Division
Shorewood	1925	Single Division
Shorewood	1926	Single Division
Shorewood	1927	Single Division
Shorewood	1929	Single Division
West Allis	1930	Single Division
Wauwatosa	1947	Single Division
Whitefish Bay	1949	Single Division
Wauwatosa	1955	Single Division
Wauwatosa	1956	Single Division
Whitefish Bay	1975	Single Division

Boys Track & Field
School	Year	Division
South Milwaukee	1935	Class B
Whitefish Bay	1937	Class B
Whitefish Bay	1938	Class B
Whitefish Bay	1939	Class B
Whitefish Bay	1940	Class B
Whitefish Bay	1941	Class B
Whitefish Bay	1942	Class B
Wauwatosa	1943	Class A
Whitefish Bay	1943	Class B
Whitefish Bay	1944	Class B
Whitefish Bay	1945	Class B
Whitefish Bay	1946	Class B
Whitefish Bay	1947	Class B
Whitefish Bay	1948	Class B
Whitefish Bay	1949	Class B
Whitefish Bay	1950	Class B
Whitefish Bay	1951	Class B
Whitefish Bay	1952	Class B
West Milwaukee	1955	Class B
Greendale	1956	Class B
Waukesha	1959	Class A
Whitefish Bay	1962	Class A
Whitefish Bay	1970	Class A
Wauwatosa East	1972	Class A

Girls Track & Field
School	Year	Division
Racine Horlick	1984	Class A

== List of conference champions ==
=== Boys Basketball ===
School	Quantity	Years
(Waukesha) South	14	1929, 1934, 1935, 1943, 1945, 1954, 1956, 1958, 1960, 1961, 1971, 1972, 1973, 1974
Shorewood	11	1927, 1928, 1932, 1933, 1939, 1940, 1941, 1942, 1944, 1946, 1968
(Wauwatosa) East	10	1937, 1938, 1948, 1949, 1950, 1964, 1965, 1970, 1981, 1982
South Milwaukee	9	1936, 1947, 1952, 1953, 1956, 1957, 1969, 1975, 1976
Whitefish Bay	8	1941, 1945, 1955, 1959, 1962, 1963, 1967, 1982
Cudahy	6	1926, 1931, 1978, 1980, 1984, 1985
(West Allis) Central	4	1928, 1930, 1942, 1979
West Milwaukee	4	1951, 1957, 1962, 1978
Milwaukee Rufus King	2	1983, 1984
Nathan Hale	2	1966, 1977
Racine Horlick	1	1985
Greendale	0	
Milwaukee Juneau	0	
Milwaukee Riverside	0	
Milwaukee West Division	0	
Racine Case	0	
Racine Park	0	
Waukesha North	0	
Wauwatosa Aggies	0	
Wauwatosa West	0	

=== Girls Basketball ===
School	Quantity	Years
South Milwaukee	6	1973, 1974, 1975, 1983, 1984, 1985
Wauwatosa East	3	1976, 1980, 1981
Whitefish Bay	3	1976, 1978, 1979
Racine Horlick	2	1982, 1985
Nathan Hale	1	1977
Waukesha South	1	1984
Wauwatosa West	1	1975
Cudahy	0	
Milwaukee Juneau	0	
Milwaukee Riverside	0	
Milwaukee Rufus King	0	
Milwaukee West Division	0	
Racine Case	0	
Racine Park	0	
Shorewood	0	
Waukesha North	0	
West Allis Central	0	
West Milwaukee	0	

=== Football ===
School	Quantity	Years
(Waukesha) South	18	1925, 1926, 1928, 1930, 1931, 1935, 1938, 1945, 1951, 1957, 1958, 1964, 1966, 1968, 1970, 1971, 1972, 1973
Whitefish Bay	13	1944, 1947, 1948, 1949, 1953, 1954, 1955, 1962, 1963, 1966, 1971, 1972, 1984
Shorewood	12	1927, 1936, 1940, 1941, 1942, 1943, 1956, 1957, 1959, 1960, 1967, 1981
South Milwaukee	9	1934, 1946, 1961, 1964, 1969, 1973, 1975, 1976, 1980
Cudahy	8	1947, 1950, 1955, 1956, 1971, 1979, 1981, 1982
(Wauwatosa) East	6	1935, 1937, 1939, 1971, 1975, 1984
Wauwatosa West	4	1965, 1975, 1982, 1983
Waukesha North	3	1975, 1978, 1983
(West Allis) Central	3	1929, 1977, 1984
Nathan Hale	2	1952, 1974
West Milwaukee	2	1933, 1980
Racine Horlick	1	1984
Greendale	0	
Milwaukee Juneau	0	
Milwaukee Riverside	0	
Milwaukee Rufus King	0	
Milwaukee West Division	0	
Racine Case	0	
Racine Park	0	
Wauwatosa Aggies	0	
