= North Shore Conference =

Wisconsin high school athletic conference

The North Shore Conference is a high school athletic conference in Wisconsin. It was founded in 1985, and membership is concentrated in the northern suburbs of the Milwaukee metropolitan area. All member schools are affiliated with the Wisconsin Interscholastic Athletic Association.

== History ==
=== 1985-1992 ===
Location of Original North Shore Conference Members

The North Shore Conference was one of three conferences formed (along with the Big Nine and Suburban Park) during the realignment of high school athletic conferences in southeastern Wisconsin for the 1985-86 school year. Six members came from the Braveland Conference (Cedarburg, Germantown, Grafton, Homestead, Nicolet and Port Washington) and four came from the disbanded Suburban Conference (Shorewood, Wauwatosa East, Wauwatosa West and Whitefish Bay). Other names considered for the conference were the Heritage Conference, Lakeshore Ten and North Suburban Conference.

=== 1992-2017 ===
Shorewood left the North Shore Conference in 1992 to take West Milwaukee's place in the Parkland Conference after the school closed its doors. In 1993, Wauwatosa East and Wauwatosa West left to become charter members of the new Woodland Conference, with Menomonee Falls moving over from the defunct Braveland Conference as a replacement. They would only last four years in the North Shore Conference and were replaced by Milwaukee Lutheran High School in 1997. Milwaukee Lutheran was in the process of joining the WIAA as part of the merger with the Wisconsin Independent Schools Athletic Association, and was the first (and to date, only) private high school in the conference.

=== 2017-present ===
Membership would stay consistent for the next twenty years before further realignment occurred. In 2017, Germantown left to join the Greater Metro Conference and Milwaukee Lutheran became a member of the Woodland Conference. They were replaced by four schools who were displaced after the dissolution of the Wisconsin Little Ten Conference: Hartford Union, Slinger, West Bend East and West Bend West. The North Shore Conference will become a seven-member loop in 2025 with the loss of Port Washington, West Bend East and West Bend West to the Glacier Trails Conference. For the 2027-28 school year, the North Shore Conference will be losing Grafton to the Glacier Trails Conference and welcoming back two former members from the Greater Metro Conference (Germantown and Menomonee Falls) per the WIAA Board of Control's ruling in March 2026.

=== Football-only alignment ===
In February 2019, in conjunction with the Wisconsin Football Coaches Association, the WIAA released a sweeping football-only realignment for Wisconsin to commence with the 2020 football season and run on a two-year cycle. The North Shore Conference's original football group consisted of full conference members Cedarburg, Hartford Union Homestead, Nicolet, Slinger, West Bend East, West Bend West and Whitefish Bay. This alignment is set to stay in place until the 2026-2027 cycle, when the conference loses three football members. West Bend East and West Bend West will move to their primary conference affiliation in the Glacier Trails Conference, which is set to begin competition next year as an all-sport conference before its first football season in 2026. The two schools will be accompanied by full NSC members Nicolet to bring the alignment to eight schools. Three schools are currently slated to replace them: Waukesha West of the Classic 8 Conference, Menomonee Falls of the Greater Metro Conference and Wisconsin Lutheran of the Woodland Conference.

== List of conference members ==
=== Current full members ===
School	Location	Affiliation	Enrollment	Mascot	Colors	Joined
Cedarburg	Cedarburg, WI	Public	1,043	Bulldogs		1985
Grafton (Note: Joining the Glacier Trails Conference for the 2027-28 school year)	Grafton, WI	Public	728	Black Hawks		1985
Hartford Union	Hartford, WI	Public	1,295	Orioles		2017
Homestead	Mequon, WI	Public	1,161	Highlanders		1985
Nicolet	Glendale, WI	Public	1,029	Knights		1985
Slinger	Slinger, WI	Public	1,050	Owls		2017
Whitefish Bay	Whitefish Bay, WI	Public	915	Blue Dukes		1985

=== Current associate members ===
School	Location	Affiliation	Mascot	Colors	Primary Conference	Sport(s)
Menomonee Falls	Menomonee Falls, WI	Public	Phoenix		Greater Metro	Football
Plymouth	Plymouth, WI	Public	Panthers		Glacier Trails	Girls Swim & Dive
Port Washington	Port Washington, WI	Public	Pirates		Glacier Trails	Girls Swim & Dive, Boys Volleyball
University School	River Hills, WI	Private (Nonsectarian)	Wildcats		Midwest Classic	Boys Lacrosse, Girls Lacrosse
Waukesha West	Waukesha, WI	Public	Wolverines		Classic 8	Football
West Bend West	West Bend, WI	Public	Spartans		Glacier Trails	Girls Swim & Dive (Note: Co-operative with West Bend East)
Wisconsin Lutheran	Milwaukee, WI	Private (WELS)	Vikings		Park Ridge	Football

=== Current co-operative members ===
Team	Colors	Host School	Co-operative Members	Sport(s)
West Bend Rush		West Bend West	West Bend East, Hartford Union, Kettle Moraine Lutheran, Living Word Lutheran, Slinger, Grafton (boys only)	Boys Lacrosse, Girls Lacrosse
WNS Wolfpack		Whitefish Bay	Nicolet, Shorewood, Dominican, Grafton (girls only)	Boys Lacrosse, Girls Lacrosse

=== Future full members ===
School	Location	Affiliation	Enrollment	Mascot	Colors	Joining	Former Conference
Germantown	Germantown, WI	Public	1,290	Warhawks		2027	Greater Metro
Menomonee Falls	Menomonee Falls, WI	Public	1,266	Phoenix		2027	Greater Metro

=== Former full members ===
School	Location	Affiliation	Mascot	Colors	Joined	Left	Conference Joined	Current Conference
Germantown	Germantown, WI	Public	Warhawks		1985	2017	Greater Metro	
Menomonee Falls	Menomonee Falls, WI	Public	Indians		1993	1997	Greater Metro	
Milwaukee Lutheran	Milwaukee, WI	Private (Lutheran, LCMS)	Red Knights		1997	2017	Woodland	
Port Washington	Port Washington, WI	Public	Pirates		1985	2025	Glacier Trails	
Shorewood	Shorewood, WI	Public	Greyhounds		1985	1992	Parkland	Woodland
Wauwatosa East	Wauwatosa, WI	Public	Red Raiders		1985	1993	Woodland	Greater Metro
Wauwatosa West	Wauwatosa, WI	Public	Trojans		1985	1993	Woodland	Greater Metro
West Bend East	West Bend, WI	Public	Suns		2017	2025	Glacier Trails	
West Bend West	West Bend, WI	Public	Spartans		2017	2025	Glacier Trails	

=== Former associate members ===
School	Location	Affiliation	Mascot	Colors	Sport(s)	Seasons	Primary Conference
West Bend East	West Bend, WI	Public	Suns		Football	2025	Glacier Trails
West Bend West	West Bend, WI	Public	Spartans		Football	2025	Glacier Trails

=== Former co-operative members ===
Program	Colors	Host School	Co-operative Members	Joined	Left	Sport
MFGSH United		Menomonee Falls	Germantown, Sussex Hamilton	2004	2006	Boys Hockey
Wauwatosa Wild United		Wauwatosa East	Wauwatosa West	2002	2010	Boys Hockey
West Bend Ice Bears		West Bend West	West Bend East, Germantown, Hartford Union, Kettle Moraine Lutheran, Kewaskum, Living Word Lutheran, Slinger	2006	2023	Boys Hockey
WNS Storm		Whitefish Bay	Nicolet, Shorewood, Dominican, Martin Luther, Milwaukee Rufus King, St. Thomas More	2002	2023	Boys Hockey

== Membership map ==
North Shore Conference
Location of North Shore Conference full members:
1 Cedarburg
2 Grafton
3 Hartford Union
4 Homestead
5 Nicolet
6 Slinger
7 Whitefish Bay

== Sponsored sports ==
	Baseball	Boys Basketball	Girls Basketball	Boys Cross Country	Girls Cross Country	Football	Boys Golf	Girls Golf	Gymnastics	Boys Lacrosse	Girls Lacrosse	Boys Soccer	Girls Soccer	Softball	Boys Swim & Dive	Girls Swim & Dive	Boys Tennis	Girls Tennis	Boys Track & Field	Girls Track & Field	Boys Volleyball	Girls Volleyball	Boys Wrestling	Girls Wrestling
Cedarburg	●	●	●	●	●	●	●	●		●	●	●	●	●	●	●	●	●	●	●	●	●	●	●
Grafton	●	●	●	●	●		●		● (Note: Co-operative with Cedarburg)			●	●	●	●	●	●	●	●	●		●	●	●
Hartford Union	●	●	●	●	●	●	●	●	●			●	●	●	● (Note: Co-operative with Slinger)	●	●	●	●	●	●	●	●	●
Homestead	●	●	●	●	●	●	●	●	●	●	●	●	●	●	●	●	●	●	●	●	●	●	●	●
Nicolet	●	●	●	●	●		●	●	●			●	●		●	●	●	●	●	●	●	●	●	●
Slinger	●	●	●	●	●	●	●	●				●	●	●			●	●	●	●		●	●	●
Whitefish Bay	●	●	●	●	●	●	●	●	●	● (Note: WNS Wolfpack co-operative)	●	●	●	●	●	●	●	●	●	●	●	●	●	●

== List of state champions ==
=== Fall sports ===
Boys Cross Country
School	Year	Division
Whitefish Bay	2005	Division 1
Port Washington	2007	Division 2

Girls Cross Country
School	Year	Division
Homestead	1986	Class A
Whitefish Bay	2008	Division 1
Slinger	2023	Division 1

Football
School	Year	Division
Port Washington	1985	Division 2
Germantown	1998	Division 2
Homestead	1999	Division 1
Germantown	2003	Division 2
Homestead	2006	Division 1
Homestead	2008	Division 1
Homestead	2012	Division 2
Homestead	2015	Division 2
Homestead	2018	Division 2
Slinger	2024	Division 2

Girls Golf
School	Year	Division
Homestead	1987	Single Division
Homestead	1999	Single Division
Homestead	2011	Division 1
Homestead	2012	Division 1

Boys Soccer
School	Year	Division
Cedarburg	1989	Single Division
Wauwatosa East	1990	Single Division
Cedarburg	1991	Single Division
Homestead	1993	Division 1
Whitefish Bay	1994	Division 1
Whitefish Bay	1995	Division 2
Cedarburg	1996	Division 1
Homestead	1999	Division 1
Whitefish Bay	2015	Division 2
Whitefish Bay	2016	Division 2
Whitefish Bay	2017	Division 2

Girls Swimming & Diving
School	Year	Division
Germantown	1992	Division 2
Germantown	1993	Division 2
Grafton	2004	Division 2
Grafton	2005	Division 2
Grafton	2013	Division 2
Grafton	2014	Division 2
Whitefish Bay	2024	Division 2

Girls Tennis
School	Year	Division
Nicolet	1989	Single Division
Nicolet	1990	Single Division
Nicolet	1992	Single Division
Nicolet	1993	Single Division
Nicolet	1994	Division 1
Nicolet	1995	Division 1
Whitefish Bay	1995	Division 2
Nicolet	1996	Division 1
Whitefish Bay	1996	Division 2
Nicolet	1998	Division 1
Whitefish Bay	1998	Division 2
Nicolet	1999	Division 1
Nicolet	2000	Division 1
Whitefish Bay	2005	Division 1
Whitefish Bay	2007	Division 1
Homestead	2008	Division 1
Homestead	2009	Division 1
Homestead	2010	Division 1
Homestead	2011	Division 1
Homestead	2012	Division 1
Homestead	2016	Division 1
Homestead	2017	Division 1
Homestead	2018	Division 1
Homestead	2019	Division 1

Girls Volleyball
School	Year	Division
Wauwatosa East	1985	Class A
Wauwatosa East	1992	Division 1

=== Winter sports ===
Boys Basketball
School	Year	Division
Wauwatosa East	1989	Class A
Whitefish Bay	1996	Division 2
Whitefish Bay	1998	Division 2
Whitefish Bay	2011	Division 2
Germantown	2012	Division 1
Germantown	2013	Division 1
Germantown	2014	Division 1
Nicolet	2019	Division 2
Whitefish Bay	2026	Division 2

Girls Basketball
School	Year	Division
Grafton	2007	Division 2
Grafton	2009	Division 2
Nicolet	2011	Division 1
Whitefish Bay	2026	Division 2

Gymnastics
School	Year	Division
Whitefish Bay	1989	Class A
Homestead	1993	Division 1
Whitefish Bay/ Shorewood	1995	Division 1
Whitefish Bay/ Shorewood	1996	Division 1
Homestead	2002	Division 1
Whitefish Bay	2001	Division 2
Whitefish Bay	2009	Division 2
Whitefish Bay	2011	Division 2
Whitefish Bay	2012	Division 2
Whitefish Bay	2014	Division 2
Whitefish Bay	2016	Division 2
Whitefish Bay	2017	Division 2
Whitefish Bay	2018	Division 2
Whitefish Bay	2019	Division 2
Hartford Union	2020	Division 1
Whitefish Bay	2021	Division 2
Whitefish Bay	2022	Division 2
Nicolet	2023	Division 2

Boys Swimming & Diving
School	Year	Division
Whitefish Bay	1997	Division 2
Homestead	1998	Division 1
Whitefish Bay	1998	Division 2
Homestead	1999	Division 1
Homestead	2000	Division 1
Homestead	2001	Division 1
Cedarburg	2021	Division 2
Whitefish Bay	2026	Division 2

=== Spring sports ===
Baseball
School	Year	Division
Milwaukee Lutheran	2002	Division 2
Milwaukee Lutheran	2003	Division 2
Milwaukee Lutheran	2015	Division 2
Whitefish Bay	2023	Division 1

Boys Golf
School	Year	Division
Homestead	1996	Division 1
Homestead	2006	Division 1
Cedarburg	2013	Division 1
Homestead	2014	Division 1

Girls Soccer
School	Year	Division
Homestead	1992	Single Division
Whitefish Bay	1994	Single Division
Homestead	1995	Single Division
Grafton	1997	Division 2
Whitefish Bay	1998	Division 2
Whitefish Bay	1999	Division 2
Whitefish Bay	2000	Division 2
Homestead	2007	Division 1
Cedarburg	2013	Division 1
Homestead	2016	Division 2
Whitefish Bay	2017	Division 2
Whitefish Bay	2021	Division 2
Whitefish Bay	2023	Division 2

Softball
School	Year	Division
Germantown	1996	Division 1

Boys Tennis
School	Year	Division
Nicolet	1986	Single Division
Nicolet	1987	Single Division
Nicolet	1988	Single Division
Nicolet	1989	Single Division
Nicolet	1990	Single Division
Nicolet	1997	Division 1
Whitefish Bay	1997	Division 2
Nicolet	1998	Division 1
Whitefish Bay	1998	Division 2
Nicolet	1999	Division 1
Whitefish Bay	1999	Division 2
Whitefish Bay	2000	Division 2
Whitefish Bay	2002	Division 2
Nicolet	2004	Division 1
Nicolet	2005	Division 1
Nicolet	2006	Division 1
Whitefish Bay	2026	Division 2

Boys Track & Field
School	Year	Division
Nicolet	1990	Class A
Grafton	2000	Division 2
Germantown	2006	Division 1
Homestead	2010	Division 1
Homestead	2026	Division 1

Girls Track & Field
School	Year	Division
Whitefish Bay	2015	Division 1

=== Summer sports ===
Baseball
School	Year
Homestead	1994
Nicolet	1998

== List of conference champions ==
=== Boys Basketball ===
School	Quantity	Years
Nicolet	12	1992, 1993, 1994, 1999, 2001, 2002, 2003, 2004, 2005, 2019, 2020, 2024
Germantown	9	2007, 2008, 2010, 2011, 2012, 2013, 2014, 2015, 2016
Homestead	7	1987, 1994, 1995, 1998, 2000, 2022, 2023
Whitefish Bay	7	1987, 1996, 1997, 1998, 2006, 2009, 2021
Wauwatosa East	6	1986, 1988, 1989, 1990, 1991, 1993
Cedarburg	4	2003, 2017, 2018, 2021
Slinger	2	2025, 2026
Port Washington	1	2010
Grafton	0	
Hartford Union	0	
Menomonee Falls	0	
Milwaukee Lutheran	0	
Shorewood	0	
Wauwatosa West	0	
West Bend East	0	
West Bend West	0	

=== Girls Basketball ===
School	Quantity	Years
Nicolet	12	1989, 1994, 1995, 1997, 1998, 1999, 2004, 2006, 2009, 2010, 2011, 2012
Grafton	8	1987, 1988, 1991, 1994, 2006, 2008, 2009, 2012
Homestead	7	1994, 1996, 2001, 2002, 2022, 2023, 2024
Cedarburg	4	2005, 2006, 2007, 2013
Germantown	4	2014, 2015, 2016, 2017
Whitefish Bay	4	1986, 2006, 2012, 2026
Hartford Union	3	2024, 2025, 2026
Port Washington	3	1990, 1999, 2000
Slinger	3	2018, 2019, 2021
Milwaukee Lutheran	2	2001, 2003
Wauwatosa East	2	1992, 1993
West Bend West	2	2020, 2021
Menomonee Falls	0	
Shorewood	0	
Wauwatosa West	0	
West Bend East	0	

=== Football ===
School	Quantity	Years
Homestead	27	1988, 1991, 1994, 1995, 1996, 1998, 2001, 2002, 2003, 2004, 2005, 2006, 2007, 2008, 2009, 2010, 2011, 2012, 2013, 2014, 2015, 2016, 2017, 2018, 2023, 2025, 2026
Whitefish Bay	9	1986, 1989, 1993, 2012, 2015, 2017, 2020, 2021, 2026
Port Washington	6	1985, 1987, 1990, 1992, 1993, 2000
Cedarburg	5	1986, 1997, 2002, 2011, 2014
Germantown	4	1997, 1999, 2000, 2014
Hartford Union	2	2019, 2022
Grafton	1	1995
Nicolet	1	1989
Slinger	1	2024
Wauwatosa East	1	1986
Menomonee Falls	0	
Milwaukee Lutheran	0	
Shorewood	0	
Waukesha West	0	
Wauwatosa West	0	
West Bend East	0	
West Bend West	0	
Wisconsin Lutheran	0	

=== Boys Hockey ===
School	Quantity	Years
Homestead	13	2003, 2004, 2005, 2006, 2007, 2011, 2012, 2015, 2016, 2017, 2018, 2019, 2020
Cedarburg	6	2008, 2009, 2010, 2011, 2014, 2015
West Bend Ice Bears	3	2021, 2022, 2023
WNS Storm	1	2013
Grafton/ Port Washington	0	
Menomonee Falls	0	
MFGSH United	0	
Wauwatosa Wild United	0	
