= Park Ridge Conference =

Wisconsin high school athletic conference

The Park Ridge Conference is a high school athletic conference comprising schools in southeastern Wisconsin. Originally founded as the football-only Parkland Football Conference in 2020, it began all-sport sponsorship with the 2026-27 school year and is affiliated with the Wisconsin Interscholastic Athletic Association.

== History ==
=== 2020-2026 ===
Location of Original Parkland Football Conference Members

The Parkland Football Conference was founded in February 2019, when the WIAA and the Wisconsin Football Coaches Association released a full realignment package for Wisconsin's high school football conferences. An eight-member conference featuring Catholic Memorial in Waukesha, Milwaukee Lutheran, New Berlin Eisenhower, New Berlin West, Pewaukee, Pius XI in Milwaukee, Wauwatosa East and Wauwatosa West was unveiled as part of this realignment. This conference was originally referred to as the Woodland West in preseason realignment materials, as five of the original members were part of the Woodland Conference for all other sports. Instead, it was named the Parkland Football Conference after the original Wisconsin high school athletic conference that competed from 1963 to 2006. Membership remained intact for the first four seasons of play before three schools left the conference: Milwaukee Lutheran fully aligned with the Woodland Conference, Pewaukee became football-only members of the Classic 8 Conference and Pius XI joined the Midwest Classic Conference in the large-schools division. Two former Classic 8 members (Waukesha North and Waukesha South) along with West Allis Central (formerly of the Greater Metro Conference) replaced the three outgoing members. In July 2026, the conference changed its name to the Park Ridge Conference in preparation for its debut season.

=== 2026-present ===
In October 2025, the WIAA fast-tracked a plan for the sixteen-member Woodland Conference to split into two separate organizations. All eight schools in the conference's Western Division (Greendale, New Berlin Eisenhower, New Berlin West, Pewaukee, Pius XI, Waukesha North, Waukesha South and Wisconsin Lutheran) will be leaving the Woodland to form a new conference, temporarily reviving the Parkland Conference name for all sports before officially becoming the Park Ridge Conference in July 2026. The eight schools in the Woodland's Eastern Division will retain the name and add two new members (Augustine Prep in Milwaukee and Nathan Hale in West Allis). The Park Ridge Conference will have seven football members for the 2026-2027 cycle and will be entering into a scheduling partnership with the Woodland Conference with one interlocking game per member school that counts in their respective conference standings.

== List of conference members ==
=== Current full members ===
School	Location	Affiliation	Enrollment	Mascot	Colors	Joined
Greendale	Greendale, WI	Public	871	Panthers		2026
New Berlin Eisenhower	New Berlin, WI	Public	731	Lions		2026
New Berlin West	New Berlin, WI	Public	719	Vikings		2026
Pewaukee	Pewaukee, WI	Public	851	Pirates		2026
Pius XI	Milwaukee, WI	Private (Catholic)	693	Popes		2026
Waukesha North	Waukesha, WI	Public	868	Northstars		2026
Waukesha South	Waukesha, WI	Public	1,073	Blackshirts		2026
Wisconsin Lutheran	Milwaukee, WI	Private (WELS)	938	Vikings		2026

=== Current associate members ===
School	Location	Affiliation	Mascot	Colors	Primary Conference	Sport(s)
Lake Country Lutheran	Hartland, WI	Private (LCMS)	Lightning		Midwest Classic	Girls Golf
Martin Luther	Greendale, WI	Private (LCMS)	Spartans		Metro Classic	Boys Volleyball
St. Thomas More	Milwaukee, WI	Private (Catholic)	Cavaliers		Metro Classic	Girls Golf
University School	River Hills, WI	Private (Nonsectarian)	Wildcats		Midwest Classic	Girls Golf
Wauwatosa East	Wauwatosa, WI	Public	Red Raiders		Greater Metro	Football
Wauwatosa West	Wauwatosa, WI	Public	Trojans		Greater Metro	Football

=== Current co-operative members ===
Team	Colors	Host School	Co-operative Members	Sport(s)
New Berlin United		Varies by sport	New Berlin Eisenhower, New Berlin West	Girls Golf, Boys Volleyball, Boys Wrestling, Girls Wrestling
Waukesha Fusion		Waukesha North	Waukesha South	Boys Volleyball
Western Lakes Swim Team		Pewaukee	Oconomowoc	Girls Swim & Dive

=== Former Parkland Football Conference members ===
School	Location	Affiliation	Mascot	Colors	Joined	Conference Joined	Primary Conference
Catholic Memorial	Waukesha, WI	Private (Catholic)	Crusaders		2020-2025	Greater Metro	Classic 8
Milwaukee Lutheran	Milwaukee, WI	Private (LCMS)	Red Knights		2020-2023	Woodland	
Pewaukee	Pewaukee, WI	Public	Pirates		2020-2023	Classic 8	Woodland
Pius XI	Milwaukee, WI	Private (Catholic)	Popes		2020-2023	Midwest Classic	Woodland
West Allis Central	West Allis, WI	Public	Bulldogs		2024-2025	Woodland	

== Membership map ==
Parkland Conference
Location of Parkland Conference full members:
1 Greendale
2 New Berlin Eisenhower
3 New Berlin West
4 Pewaukee
5 Pius XI
6 Waukesha North
7 Waukesha South
8 Wisconsin Lutheran

== Sponsored sports ==
	Baseball	Boys Basketball	Girls Basketball	Boys Cross Country	Girls Cross Country	Football	Boys Golf	Girls Golf	Boys Soccer	Girls Soccer	Softball	Girls Swim & Dive	Boys Tennis	Girls Tennis	Boys Track & Field	Girls Track & Field	Boys Volleyball	Girls Volleyball	Boys Wrestling	Girls Wrestling
Greendale	●	●	●	●	●		●	●	●	●	●	●	●	●	●	●	●	●	●	●
New Berlin Eisenhower	●	●	●	●	●	●	●	● (Note: New Berlin United co-operative)	●	●	●	●	●	●	●	●	●	●		
New Berlin West	●	●	●	●	●	●	●		●	●	●	●	●	●	●	●		●	●	●
Pewaukee	●	●	●	●	●	●	●	●	●	●	●	● (Note: Western Lakes Swim Team co-operative)	●	●	●	●	●	●	●	●
Pius XI	●	●	●	●	●		●		●	●	●		●	●	●	●	●	●	●	●
Waukesha North	●	●	● (Note: Co-operative with Waukesha South)	●	●	●	●		●	●	●	● (Note: Co-operative with Kettle Moraine)	●	●	●	●		●	●	●
Waukesha South	●	●		●	●	●	●	● (Note: Co-operative with Waukesha North and Waukesha West)	●	●	●	● (Note: Co-operative with Mukwonago)	●	●	●	●	● (Note: Waukesha Fusion co-operative)	●	●	●
Wisconsin Lutheran	●	●	●	●	●		●		●	●	●				●	●		●	●	●

== List of conference champions ==
=== Boys Basketball ===
School	Quantity	Years
Greendale	0	
New Berlin Eisenhower	0	
New Berlin West	0	
Pewaukee	0	
Pius XI	0	
Waukesha North	0	
Waukesha South	0	
Wisconsin Lutheran	0	

=== Girls Basketball ===
School	Quantity	Years
Greendale	0	
New Berlin Eisenhower	0	
New Berlin West	0	
Pewaukee	0	
Pius XI	0	
Waukesha North	0	
Waukesha South	0	
Wisconsin Lutheran	0	

=== Football ===
School	Quantity	Years
Catholic Memorial	6	2020, 2021, 2022, 2023, 2024, 2025
Pewaukee	1	2026
Milwaukee Lutheran	0	
New Berlin Eisenhower	0	
New Berlin West	0	
Pius XI	0	
Waukesha North	0	
Waukesha South	0	
Wauwatosa East	0	
Wauwatosa West	0	
West Allis Central	0	
