= Parkland Conference =

Wisconsin high school athletic conference (1963-2006)

The Parkland Conference is a former high school athletic conference with its membership concentrated in southeastern Wisconsin. It was in existence from 1963 to 2006 and all member schools were affiliated with the Wisconsin Interscholastic Athletic Association.

== History ==
=== 1963–1980 ===
Location of Original Parkland Conference Members

The Parkland Conference was formed in 1963 as a result of population growth and new school districts being formed in the Milwaukee area during the previous decade. Most of the high schools in these new districts joined the Braveland Conference, which was founded in 1953 and grew to seventeen members after only a decade of competition. The eight schools located south of Interstate 94 (Franklin, Greendale, Greenfield, Muskego, New Berlin, Oak Creek, St. Francis and Whitnall) split from the Braveland and became the original members of the Parkland Conference. A ninth member was added in 1970 when New Berlin Eisenhower opened as the New Berlin district's second high school. The Parkland Conference competed as a nine-member loop for the next decade before major changes would occur.

=== 1980–1985 ===
In 1980, the high school athletic conferences in southeastern Wisconsin went through a comprehensive realignment after years of discussion and failing to reach agreements. Two conferences were disbanded (the Scenic Moraine and South Shore), and four of the schools that were displaced (Kettle Moraine, Pewaukee, Racine Case and Slinger) became Parkland Conference members. Mukwonago also moved over from the Southern Lakes Conference that year, and the conference split into Eastern and Western divisions:

Eastern Division	Western Division
Greendale	Franklin
Greenfield	Kettle Moraine
Mukwonago	New Berlin Eisenhower
Muskego	Pewaukee
New Berlin	Slinger
Oak Creek	St. Francis
Racine Case	Whitnall

Racine Case left the Parkland Conference for membership in the Suburban Conference in 1983, and the league would compete with thirteen members in two divisions for two more seasons.

=== 1985–1997 ===
Location of Parkland Conference Members (1985-1992)

A second extensive realignment occurred in 1985 after failing to fix some of the issues with travel and competitive balance that the 1980 realignment was supposed to remedy. This time, the Suburban Conference met its demise with one of the displaced schools, West Milwaukee, joining the Parkland Conference. Brown Deer also moved over from the Braveland Conference as part of the realignment, swapping affiliations with Mukwonago in the process. Most significantly, the Parkland Conference lost five members to the new Suburban Park Conference: Greendale, Greenfield, Kettle Moraine, Muskego and Oak Creek. These were some of the largest schools in the conference, and the new-look Parkland emerged with a larger geographic footprint and a smaller average enrollment than some of the other new conferences created. The Parkland Conference continued with this roster until 1992, when West Milwaukee High School closed its doors. Shorewood joined from the North Shore Conference to take their place. Another change occurred in 1993, when Franklin left to join the new Woodland Conference with Hamilton High School in Sussex replacing them after being displaced from the shuttered Braveland Conference.

=== 1997–2006 ===
Location of Final Parkland Conference Members

In 1997, the Parkland Conference lost four member schools: three joined the Woodland Conference (New Berlin Eisenhower, New Berlin West and Whitnall) and Hamilton became a charter member of the Greater Metro Conference. Taking their place were four private schools who were in the process of joining the WIAA as part of the merger with their previous organization, the Wisconsin Independent Schools Athletic Association. Dominican in Whitefish Bay and Martin Luther in Greendale joined in 1997, while Kettle Moraine Lutheran in Jackson and Luther Prep in Watertown entered the year after. Aside from Martin Luther returning to the Midwest Classic Conference in 2003, the Parkland Conference continued with this membership roster until it was disbanded in 2006. Four schools joined the Woodland Conference (Brown Deer, Pewaukee, Shorewood and St. Francis), Dominican entered the Midwest Classic Conference, Kettle Moraine Lutheran became a charter member of the Wisconsin Flyway Conference, Luther Prep joined the Capitol Conference and Slinger shifted to the Wisconsin Little Ten Conference.

== Conference membership history ==
=== Final members ===
School	Location	Affiliation	Mascot	Colors	Joined	Left	Conference Joined	Current Conference
Brown Deer	Brown Deer, WI	Public	Falcons		1985	2006	Woodland	
Dominican	Whitefish Bay, WI	Private (Catholic, Sinsinawa Dominicans)	Knights		1997	2006	Midwest Classic	Metro Classic
Kettle Moraine Lutheran	Jackson, WI	Private (Lutheran, WELS)	Chargers		1998	2006	Wisconsin Flyway	Glacier Trails
Luther Prep	Watertown, WI	Private (Lutheran, WELS)	Phoenix		1998	2006	Capitol	Midwest Classic
Pewaukee	Pewaukee, WI	Public	Pirates		1980	2006	Woodland	
Shorewood	Shorewood, WI	Public	Greyhounds		1992	2006	Woodland	
Slinger	Slinger, WI	Public	Owls		1980	2006	Wisconsin Little Ten	North Shore
St. Francis	St. Francis, WI	Public	Mariners		1963	2006	Woodland	Midwest Classic

=== Previous members ===
School	Location	Affiliation	Mascot	Colors	Joined	Left	Conference Joined	Current Conference
Franklin	Franklin, WI	Public	Sabers		1963	1993	Southeast	
Greendale	Greendale, WI	Public	Panthers		1963	1985	Suburban Park	Woodland
Greenfield	Greenfield, WI	Public	Hustlin' Hawks		1963	1985	Suburban Park	Woodland
Hamilton	Sussex, WI	Public	Chargers		1993	1997	Greater Metro	
Kettle Moraine	Wales, WI	Public	Lasers		1980	1985	Suburban Park	Classic 8
Martin Luther	Greendale, WI	Private (Lutheran, LCMS)	Spartans		1997	2003	Midwest Classic	Metro Classic
Mukwonago	Mukwonago, WI	Public	Indians		1980	1985	Braveland	Classic 8
Muskego	Muskego, WI	Public	Warriors		1963	1985	Suburban Park	Woodland
New Berlin Eisenhower	New Berlin, WI	Public	Lions		1970	1997	Woodland	
New Berlin West	New Berlin, WI	Public	Vikings		1963	1997	Woodland	
Oak Creek	Oak Creek, WI	Public	Knights		1963	1985	Suburban Park	Classic 8
Racine Case	Racine, WI	Public	Eagles		1980	1983	Suburban	Southeast
West Milwaukee	West Milwaukee, WI	Public	Mustangs		1985	1992	Closed in 1992	
Whitnall	Greenfield, WI	Public	Falcons		1963	1997	Woodland	

== Membership timeline ==
=== Full members ===
Eastern Division Western Division

=== Football members ===
Eastern Division Western Division

== List of state champions ==
=== Fall sports ===
Boys Cross Country
School	Year	Division
St. Francis	1975	Class B

Football
School	Year	Division
New Berlin Eisenhower	1995	Division 3
New Berlin Eisenhower	1996	Division 3
Slinger	1998	Division 3

Boys Soccer
School	Year	Division
Brown Deer	1992	Division 2
Shorewood	1997	Division 2
Slinger	2005	Division 2

Girls Volleyball
School	Year	Division
Oak Creek	1982	Class A
New Berlin West	1984	Class A
Kettle Moraine Lutheran	2003	Division 3
Kettle Moraine Lutheran	2004	Division 3

=== Winter sports ===
Boys Basketball
School	Year	Division
St. Francis	1976	Class B
Whitnall	1988	Class B
Dominican	1998	Division 1 (WISAA)
Dominican	2000	Division 2 (WISAA)

Girls Basketball
School	Year	Division
Dominican	2000	Division 2 (WISAA)

=== Spring sports ===
Boys Golf
School	Year	Division
Brown Deer	1991	Division 2
Pewaukee	2002	Division 2
Pewaukee	2003	Division 2

Softball
School	Year	Division
Kettle Moraine Lutheran	1999	Division 2 (WISAA)

Boys Track & Field
School	Year	Division
St. Francis	1976	Class B
Brown Deer	1997	Division 2
Brown Deer	1998	Division 2

Girls Track & Field
School	Year	Division
Brown Deer	1987	Class B

=== Summer sports ===
Baseball
School	Year
Greendale	1980
Greenfield	1983
Whitnall	1991

== List of conference champions ==
=== Boys Basketball ===
School	Quantity	Years
Whitnall	7	1966, 1972, 1983, 1987, 1988, 1989, 1991
Dominican	6	1998, 1999, 2000, 2002, 2004, 2005
New Berlin Eisenhower	5	1976, 1977, 1981, 1986, 1993
New Berlin West	5	1973, 1974, 1978, 1979, 1984
Greendale	4	1969, 1970, 1971, 1976
Brown Deer	3	1990, 1992, 1995
Kettle Moraine	3	1982, 1983, 1984
Muskego	3	1964, 1965, 1985
Franklin	2	1975, 1985
Greenfield	2	1967, 1968
Shorewood	2	1994, 1996
Slinger	2	1997, 2003
Kettle Moraine Lutheran	1	2006
Oak Creek	1	1980
Pewaukee	1	2001
St. Francis	1	1977
Hamilton	0	
Luther Prep	0	
Martin Luther	0	
Mukwonago	0	
Racine Case	0	
West Milwaukee	0	

=== Girls Basketball ===
School	Quantity	Years
Slinger	7	1998, 1999, 2000, 2001, 2002, 2003, 2004
New Berlin Eisenhower	6	1987, 1988, 1989, 1990, 1991, 1996
New Berlin West	5	1983, 1984, 1985, 1986, 1997
Oak Creek	4	1981, 1982, 1983, 1984
Whitnall	3	1982, 1994, 1995
Brown Deer	2	1992, 1993
Kettle Moraine Lutheran	2	2004, 2005
Pewaukee	2	2004, 2006
St. Francis	2	1981, 1983
Dominican	1	2001
Greendale	1	1985
Muskego	1	1984
Franklin	0	
Greenfield	0	
Hamilton	0	
Kettle Moraine	0	
Luther Prep	0	
Martin Luther	0	
Mukwonago	0	
Racine Case	0	
Shorewood	0	
West Milwaukee	0	
Champions from 1976-1980 unknown

=== Football ===
School	Quantity	Years
New Berlin Eisenhower	7	1973, 1977, 1981, 1985, 1986, 1987, 1988
Muskego	6	1967, 1971, 1974, 1975, 1979, 1984
Luther Prep	4	1998, 1999, 2000, 2001
New Berlin West	4	1964, 1966, 1970, 1991
Slinger	4	1983, 1984, 1992, 1997
St. Francis	4	1980, 1996, 2002, 2003
Brown Deer	3	1991, 2004, 2005
Franklin	3	1982, 1989, 1990
Greendale	3	1968, 1969, 1981
Greenfield	3	1965, 1976, 1978
Hamilton	3	1993, 1994, 1995
Mukwonago	2	1982, 1983
Oak Creek	2	1963, 1972
Pewaukee	2	2002, 2005
Racine Case	1	1980
Dominican	0	
Kettle Moraine	0	
Kettle Moraine Lutheran	0	
Martin Luther	0	
Shorewood	0	
West Milwaukee	0	
Whitnall	0	
