= Brookfield Central High School =

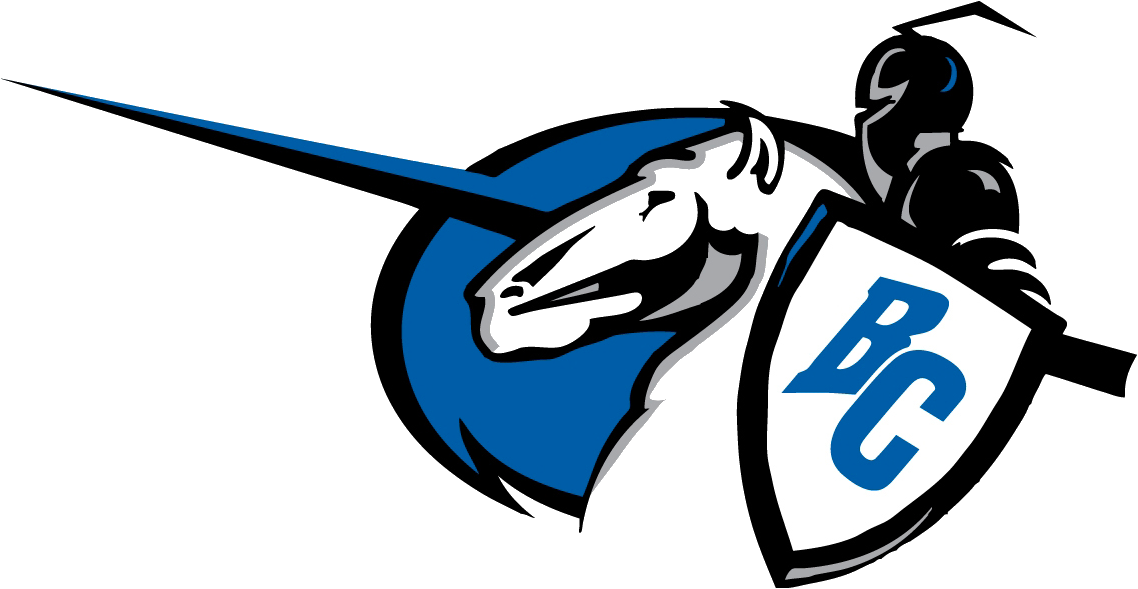

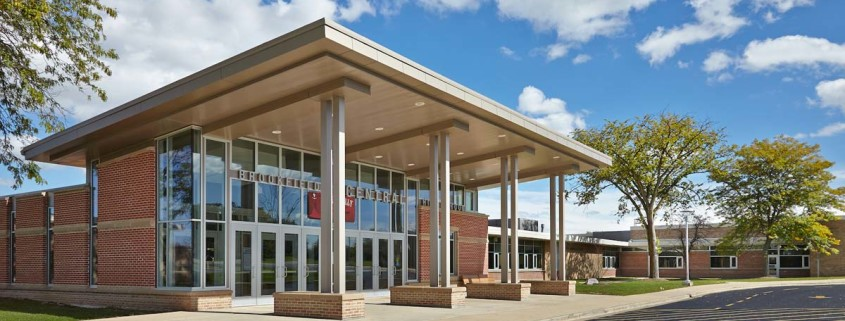

Location
- 16900 Gebhardt Rd; Brookfield, Wisconsin; United States; 43.054725°N 88.122522°W

Information
- Type: Public secondary
- Established: 1955
- School district: Elmbrook School District
- Principal: Brett Gruetzmacher
- Teaching staff: 74.07 (FTE)
- Grades: 9–12
- Enrollment: 1,172 (2023-2024)
- Student to teacher ratio: 15.82
- Colors: Royal Blue, White, and Silver
- Mascot: Lancer
- Rivals: Brookfield East, Marquette
- Newspaper: Brookfield Central Tyro
- Yearbook: Legend
- Website: www.elmbrookschools.org/brookfield-central-high-school

Brookfield Central High School is a comprehensive public secondary school located in the city of Brookfield, Wisconsin, United States. About 1200 students attend every year. It is a sister school to Brookfield East High School, also in Brookfield. The high school is administered by the Elmbrook School District, which operates nine schools in Brookfield and Elm Grove.

== Athletics ==
BCHS won the 2019 boys' basketball state championship in 2019

BCHS won a state championship in boys' cross country in 1964 and 2009.

=== Conference affiliation history ===
- Braveland Conference (1956-1993)
- Woodland Conference (1993-1997)
- Greater Metro Conference (1997–present)

== Notable alumni ==
- Ayad Akhtar (1988), playwright and author
- Steve Avery (1984), former NFL running back for the Pittsburgh Steelers
- Bill Carollo (1970), former NFL official
- Kip Carpenter (1998), Olympic bronze medalist (speedskating)
- Susan Engeleiter (1970), Wisconsin politician and former administrator of the United States Small Business Administration
- Daron Hagen (1979), composer, stage director, author, filmmaker
- Kenny Harrison (1983), track and field athlete and Olympic gold medalist
- Kathleen Hogan (1984), chief human resources officer at Microsoft
- Brad Nortman (2008), former NFL Punter for the Carolina Panthers and Jacksonville Jaguars
- John P. Otjen (1960), United States Army lieutenant general
- Joe Thomas (2003), former NFL offensive tackle for the Cleveland Browns, NFL Hall of Famer 2023

== Survey controversy ==
In March 2021, Brookfield Central High School received media attention after a teacher administered a survey about students' sexual activity during a health class in December 2020. The survey included questions about students' sexual history, drug or alcohol use during sexual intercourse, and contraceptive use. According to students interviewed by WISN 12 News, participation was optional and responses were submitted anonymously through the Poll Everywhere platform.

Following public criticism, principal Brett Gruetzmacher informed parents that the teacher had not been authorized to administer the survey under district policy, which required the use of approved instructional materials for human growth and development lessons. He stated that the survey was not affiliated with the Wisconsin Youth Risk Behavior Survey and that no student-specific information had been recorded. The district investigated the incident, and the principal apologized, stating that the school had fallen short of its goal of ensuring a safe environment for students. The school said the survey would not be used again.
