= Brown Deer High School =

Brown Deer Middle/High School

Location
- 8060 N 60th Street; Brown Deer, Milwaukee County, Wisconsin 53223; United States; 43°09′55.4″N 87°58′57.8″W

Information
- Funding type: Public
- Principal: Jamie Sims
- Staff: 71.42 (FTE)
- Grades: 6 through 12
- Enrollment: 904 (2024-2025)
- Student to teacher ratio: 12.66
- Color
- Song: March Of The Falcons
- Athletics conference: Woodland Conference
- Mascot: Freddy The Falcon
- Nickname: Falcons
- Website: www.browndeerschools.com

Brown Deer Middle/High School is a high school on North 60th Street, Brown Deer, Wisconsin, USA. It serves approximately 800 students in grades 6 through 12.

== Athletics ==
The school's sports teams are known as the Falcons, and their colors are black and gold. The school has been part of the Woodland Conference since 2006. Their most recent state championship was in boys' track in 2008, and their most recent conference championship was in boys' football during the 2010–2011 season, with recent conference championships in boys' football and basketball in 2007–2008. The undefeated football team won the Parkland Conference Championship in 2004. The Falcons' rival schools are Pewaukee, New Berlin Eisenhower, and Greendale.

=== Conference affiliation history ===
- Braveland Conference (1958-1985)
- Parkland Conference (1985-2006)
- Woodland Conference (2006–present)
- Metro Classic Conference (2020–present, football only)

== Notable alumni ==
- Zack Baun, professional football player for the Philadelphia Eagles
- Dan Harmon, television producer
- Steve Novak, professional basketball player and announcer for the Milwaukee Bucks
- Tejhaun Palmer, professional football player for the Arizona Cardinals
- Diane Sykes, federal judge
