= Suburban Park Conference =

Wisconsin high school athletic conference (1985-1993)

The Suburban Park Conference is a former high school athletic conference in Wisconsin, operating from 1985 to 1993 and consisting of larger high schools in the southern suburbs of Milwaukee.

== History ==
Location of Suburban Park Conference Members

The Suburban Park Conference was formed in the aftermath of extensive athletic conference realignment in southeastern Wisconsin following the 1984-85 school year. It was one of three new conferences created that year (along with the Big Nine and North Shore conferences), and comprised former members of both the folded Suburban Conference (Cudahy, Nathan Hale, South Milwaukee and West Allis Central) and the Parkland Conference (Greendale, Greenfield, Kettle Moraine, Muskego and Oak Creek). The conference was named after the two conferences (Suburban and Parkland) where member schools came from, and membership was consistent over its eight-year lifespan. In 1993, the Suburban Park Conference was realigned out of existence by the WIAA, along with the Big Nine and Braveland Conferences. The five largest schools in the Suburban Park (Kettle Moraine, Muskego, Nathan Hale, Oak Creek and West Allis Central) helped form the new fifteen-member Southeast Conference and four smallest schools (Cudahy, Greendale, Greenfield and South Milwaukee) became members of the new Woodland Conference.

== Conference membership history ==
School	Location	Affiliation	Mascot	Colors	Joined	Left	Conference Joined	Current Conference
Cudahy	Cudahy, WI	Public	Packers		1985	1993	Woodland	
Greendale	Greendale, WI	Public	Panthers		1985	1993	Woodland	
Greenfield	Greenfield, WI	Public	Hustlin' Hawks		1985	1993	Woodland	
Kettle Moraine	Wales, WI	Public	Lasers		1985	1993	Southeast	Classic 8
Muskego	Muskego, WI	Public	Warriors		1985	1993	Southeast	Classic 8
Nathan Hale	West Allis, WI	Public	Huskies		1985	1993	Southeast	Greater Metro
Oak Creek	Oak Creek, WI	Public	Knights		1985	1993	Southeast	Classic 8
South Milwaukee	South Milwaukee, WI	Public	Rockets		1985	1993	Woodland	
West Allis Central	West Allis, WI	Public	Bulldogs		1985	1993	Southeast	Woodland

== List of state champions ==
=== Fall sports ===
Football
School	Year	Division
Kettle Moraine	1988	Division 2

=== Winter sports ===
Gymnastics
School	Year	Division
Kettle Moraine	1992	Division 1

=== Spring sports ===
Softball
School	Year	Division
South Milwaukee	1988	Class A

=== Summer sports ===
Baseball (Note: Baseball was sponsored by the WIAA as a spring and summer sport from 1965-2018. The Suburban Park Conference competed in baseball as a summer sport during this time period.)
School	Year	Division
Greendale	1987	Single Division
Kettle Moraine	1988	Single Division

== List of conference champions ==
=== Boys Basketball ===
School	Quantity	Years
Nathan Hale	3	1989, 1991, 1992
Muskego	2	1986, 1987
Cudahy	1	1990
Kettle Moraine	1	1989
Oak Creek	1	1993
South Milwaukee	1	1988
Greendale	0	
Greenfield	0	
West Allis Central	0	

=== Girls Basketball ===
School	Quantity	Years
Greendale	5	1986, 1989, 1990, 1991, 1992
South Milwaukee	3	1987, 1988, 1989
Kettle Moraine	1	1988
Nathan Hale	1	1993
Cudahy	0	
Greenfield	0	
Muskego	0	
Oak Creek	0	
West Allis Central	0	

=== Football ===
School	Quantity	Years
Greendale	3	1986, 1991, 1992
Muskego	2	1985, 1987
West Allis Central	2	1989, 1990
Cudahy	1	1988
Kettle Moraine	1	1988
Nathan Hale	1	1989
Greenfield	0	
Oak Creek	0	
South Milwaukee	0	
