= Greendale School District =

School district in Greendale, Wisconsin, United States

Address
- 6815 Southway Greendale, Wisconsin, 53129; United States
- Coordinates: 42°56′04″N 87°59′56″W

District information
- Type: Public School District
- Grades: PK–12
- Established: 1939; 86 years ago
- NCES District ID: 5505910

Students and staff
- Enrollment: 2,609 (2023–24)
- Teachers: 196.32 (on an FTE basis)
- Student–teacher ratio: 13.29

Other information
- Website: www.greendale.k12.wi.us

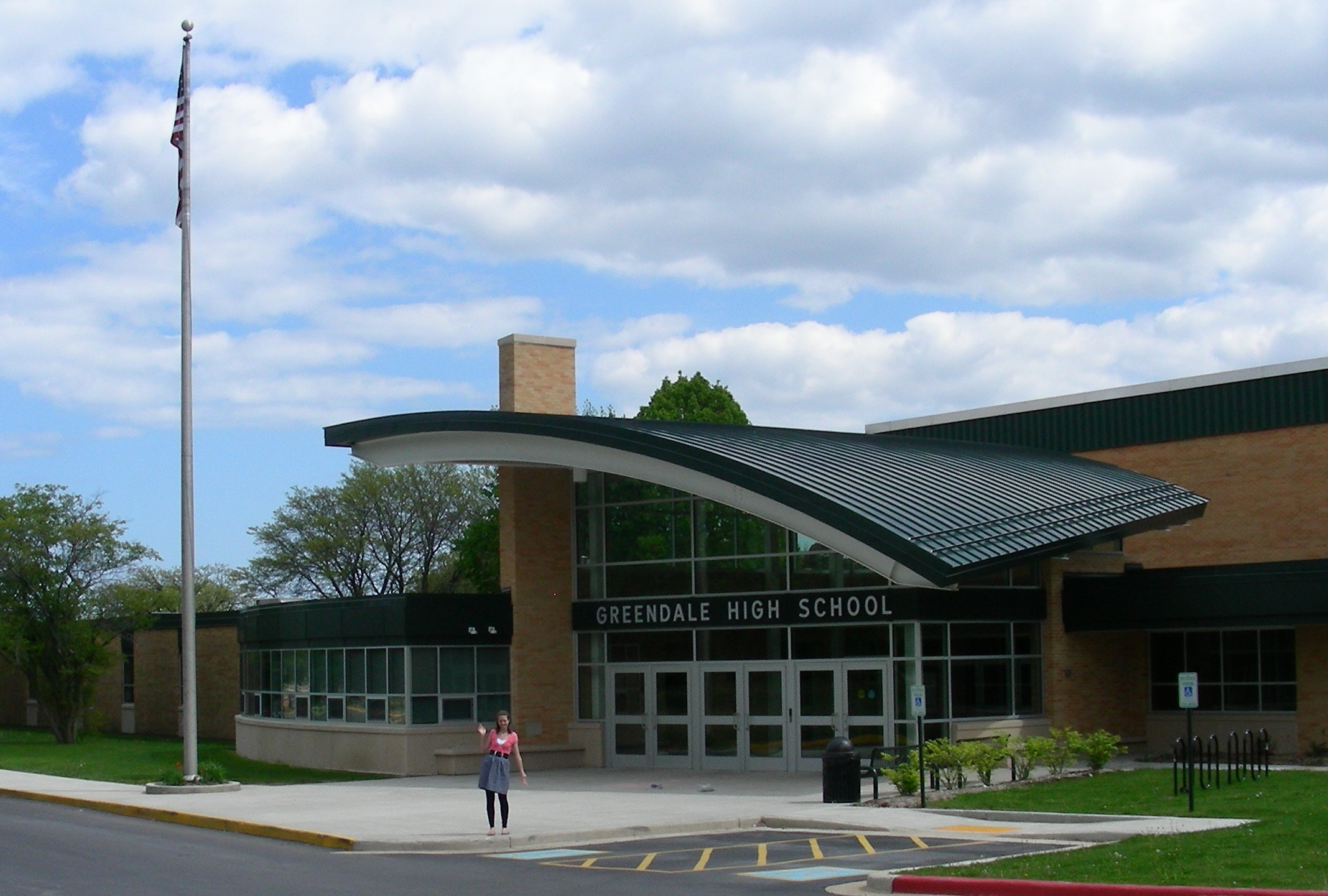
Greendale High School

Greendale School District is a public school district in Milwaukee County, Wisconsin. The district serves more than 2,600 students from kindergarten through twelfth grade. Greendale High School, Greendale Middle School, and three elementary schools (Canterbury, College Park, and Highland View) serve the district's students.
