= South Milwaukee High School =

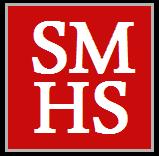

Location
- 801 15th Avenue; South Milwaukee, Wisconsin 53172; United States
- Coordinates: 42°55′20″N 87°52′10″W

Information
- School type: Public High School
- School district: South Milwaukee School District
- Principal: Bryan Terry
- Teaching staff: 69.10 (FTE)
- Grades: 9 - 12
- Enrollment: 979 (2023–2024)
- Student to teacher ratio: 14.17
- Colors: Red, black, silver, white
- Mascot: Rocket
- Accreditation: AdvancED
- Newspaper: The Harbinger
- Affiliations: WIAA, Woodland Conference
- Website: hs.sdsm.k12.wi.us

South Milwaukee High School, "Home of the Rockets," is a high school located in the city of South Milwaukee, Wisconsin, United States, a suburb of Milwaukee. Approximately 1,000 students attend the high school. The school is operated by the School District of South Milwaukee.

== Extracurricular activities ==
A variety of sports and activities are offered at South Milwaukee High School. The athletic teams compete in the Woodland Conference of the WIAA. SMHS won state championships in boys' cross country in 1937, 1938, 1939, 1940, 1941, 1949, 1950, 1951, 1952 and 1965.

Fall	Winter	Spring	Summer
Cheerleading	Powerlifting	Boys' basketball	
Student senate	Co-ed cross country	Girls' basketball	Boys' golf
Math club	Fall play	Cheerleading	Girls' soccer
Chess club	Football	Madrigal choir	Tennis
AHANA	Wrestling	Pom poms	Spring musical
Yearbook	Pom poms	Boys' swimming	Vocal jazz
DECA	Boys' soccer	Boys' track	Boys' tennis
Anime club	Girls' swimming	Girls' track	Boys' baseball
Marching band	Girls' tennis	Girls' softball	
HOSA	Boys' volleyball		
GSA	Girls' volleyball		

=== Conference affiliation history ===
- Suburban Conference (1925-1985)
- Suburban Park Conference (1985-1993)
- Woodland Conference (1993-1997)
- Southeast Conference (1997-2009)
- Woodland Conference (2009–present)

== Notable alumni ==
- Reginald Lisowski (1944), professional wrestler
- Jerry Dreva (1963), artist
- Phil Sobocinski (1964), NFL player
- Kurt Nimphius (1976), NBA player
- Lauren Kleppin (2006), long distance runner
- Trey McKinney-Jones (2008), NBA player
- Anies Rasyid Baswedan (1988), AFS Student, Minister of Education & Culture The Republic of Indonesia (2014) , Governor of Jakarta Special Capital Region (2017-2022)
