= Germantown High School (Wisconsin) =

Public high school in Germantown, Wisconsin, US

Location
- W180 N11501 River Lane; Germantown, Wisconsin 53022-3198; United States

Information
- School type: Public High School
- School district: Germantown School District
- Principal: David Smith
- Teaching staff: 85.82 (FTE)
- Grades: 9 through 12
- Enrollment: 1,290 (2023-2024)
- Student to teacher ratio: 15.03
- Color
- Athletics conference: Greater Metro Conference
- Team name: Warhawks
- Website: https://www.gsdwi.org/o/ghs

Germantown High School is a high school in Germantown, Wisconsin. It is part of the Germantown School District. The school was founded in 1957 as Washington Union High School.

== Academics ==
The school teaches core subjects, technology education, physical education, and the fine arts. The AP courses offered at GHS consist of Psychology, United States History, Microeconomics, Macroeconomics, European History, AB and BC Calculus, Statistics, Biology, Chemistry, Physics, English Literature, English Language and Composition, and Music Theory. Foreign languages offered are German and Spanish.

== Extracurricular activities ==
Germantown High School's Destination ImagiNation program teams have represented the school at Global Finals. Dramatic Impact, the school's theater group, presents three productions each year. Germantown High also sponsors other activities, such as yearbook, Environmental Club, Key Club, German Honor Society, Spanish Honor Society, Battle Bots, FRC Robotics Team 5096, Wall of Sound (Germantown's competitive marching band), Pep Band, FBLA, DECA, and Student Council.

Germantown High School, since 2007, has also participated in the Every 15 Minutes national program, having presentations in the spring of 2007, 2010, 2013, 2016, and 2019. The 2013 video presentation can be viewed on the school's YouTube page.

=== Athletics ===
The school competes in the Greater Metro Conference, and offers the following sports:

- Fall: Boys' football, girls' tennis, boys' soccer, boys' cross-country, girls' cross-country, girls' golf, girls' volleyball, girls' swimming, boys' volleyball
- Winter: boys' basketball, boys' ice hockey, boys' swimming, boys' wrestling, girls' basketball, girls' gymnastics, boys' bowling, girls' bowling
- Spring: boys' baseball, boys' track, boys' tennis, boys' golf, girls' softball, girls' track and field, girls' soccer, boys' lacrosse, and girls' lacrosse ( Both girls and boys lacrosse is run through Sussex Hamilton )

The football team had undefeated seasons in 1973 and 1974. It took first place in WIAA Division 2 in 1998 and 2003.

In 1972, the boys' track team took first in the WIAA Division 2 Championships. In 2006 the boys' track team took first in the WIAA Division 1 Championship.

In 2008 and 2009, the boys' basketball team went to the state tournament, losing both years to the #1 seed in the first round. Germantown won its first Wisconsin Interscholastic Athletic Association Division 1 basketball state championship in 2012, beating Milwaukee King 72 to 69 in the title game. The school won their second consecutive WIAA Division 1 basketball state championship in 2013, defeating Mukwonago 57-28, after a second undefeated season. Germantown basketball player and senior Luke Fischer was named Wisconsin Mr. Basketball for 2013. Germantown faced Neenah High School for the 2014 state championship and won their third consecutive state title 48-42.

=== Conference affiliation history ===
- Scenic Moraine Conference (1958-1980)
- Braveland Conference (1980-1985)
- North Shore Conference (1985-2017)
- Greater Metro Conference (2017–present)

== Notable alumni ==
- KK Arnold - American basketball player
- Luke Fischer - Armenian-American professional basketball player
- Natalie McNeal - Green Bay Phoenix champion and MVP
- Rebecca Murray - wheelchair basketball player; four-time Paralympian, and two-time gold medalist.
- Jesse Thielke - Olympic wrestler
- Paul Wagner - former professional baseball player. Wagner was inducted into the Germantown Athletic Hall of Fame in 2010.
