= Poll Everywhere =

American audience response company

- Screenshot
- Website type: Private
- Founded: 2007; 19 years ago
- Headquarters: San Francisco, USA
- Key people: Jeff Vyduna (Co-Founder); Brad Gessler (Co-Founder); Sean Eby (Co-founder)
- Industry: Audience response systems
- Website: polleverywhere.comm

Poll Everywhere is an American audience response company headquartered in San Francisco, California. The company, founded in April 2007 is an online service for classroom response and audience response systems. Poll Everywhere's product allows audiences and classrooms in over 100 countries to use mobile phones, thereby "plotting the obsolescence" of proprietary hardware response devices otherwise known as clickers.

The company raised $20,000 in venture funding from Y Combinator in 2008.

== Origins ==
Jeff Vyduna, Brad Gessler, and Sean Eby were coworkers at Deloitte Consulting charged with giving internal presentations. One day, to keep the audience awake, they decided to pull a text message "out of a hat". Code was started in April 2007, and the online site launched in September 2007. During that time, Vyduna matriculated at the Sloan School of Management at MIT. On May 14, 2008, the company placed as a semi finalist in the MIT $100K Entrepreneurship Challenge.

Vyduna subsequently took a leave of absence when Poll Everywhere was accepted into Y Combinator in mid-2008; In 2010 the company moved to San Francisco.

== Reception ==
Mashable noted in 2009, "The Usefulness of Poll Everywhere is apparent."

== See also ==
- Audience Response Systems
