= Waukesha South High School =

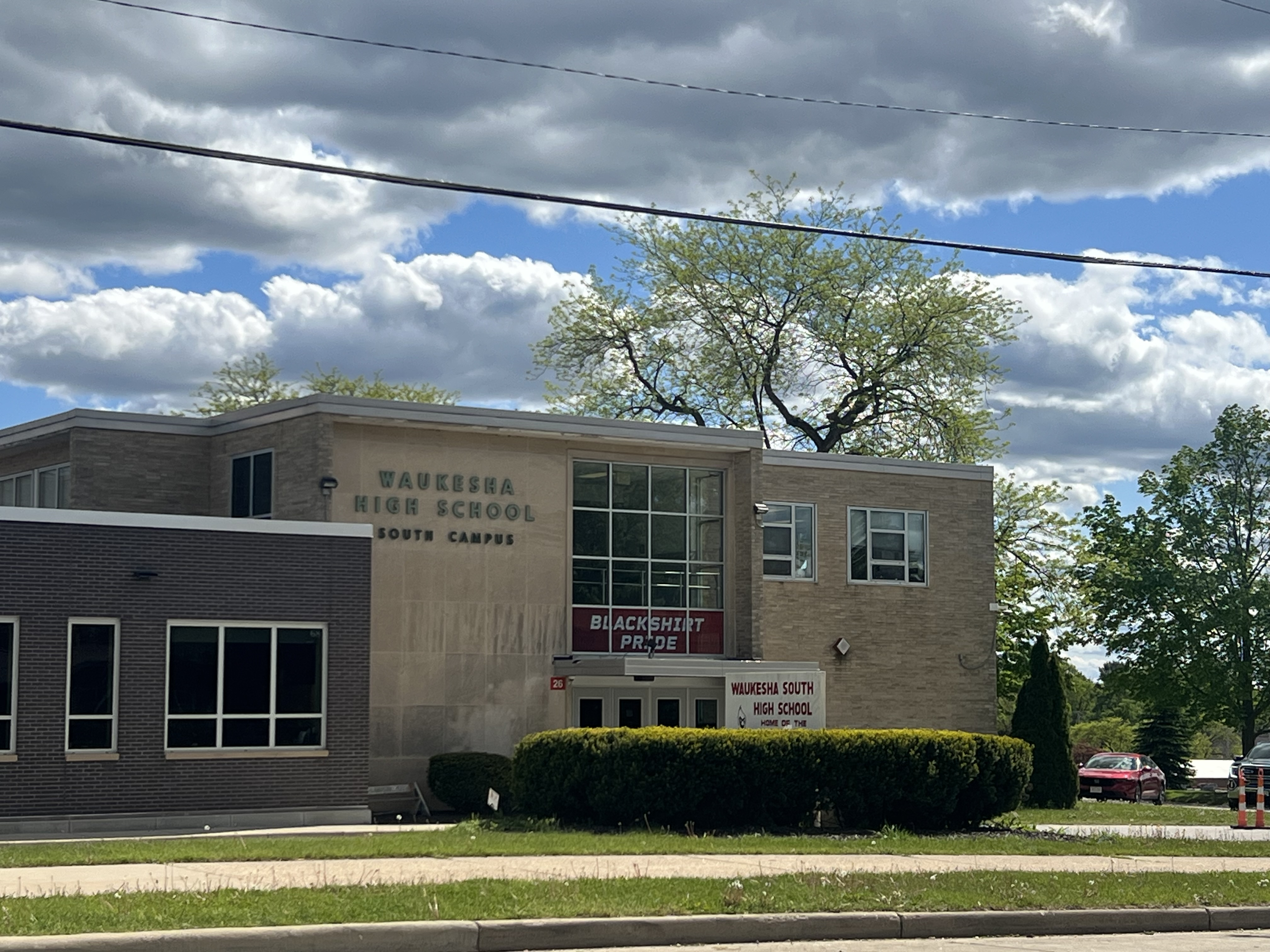

Location
- 401 E. Roberta Ave; Waukesha, Wisconsin; USA; 42°59′36″N 88°13′22″W

Information
- Type: Public high school
- Established: 1957
- School district: Waukesha School District
- Principal: Maria D'Amato-Kuche
- Teaching staff: 74.78 (FTE)
- Grades: 9–12
- Enrollment: 879 (2023–2024)
- Student to teacher ratio: 11.75
- Campus: Suburban
- Colors: Red, white, and black
- Athletics: www.goblackshirts.com
- Mascot: Cardinal (Blackie the Blackshirt)
- Newspaper: The Blackshirt
- Yearbook: Megaphone
- Website: https://sdw.waukesha.k12.wi.us/o/southhs

Waukesha South High School is one of three high schools located in Waukesha, Wisconsin. It was opened in 1957 as a southern campus to Waukesha High School, then in downtown Waukesha. The downtown campus is now Les Paul Middle School – Central Campus.

== History ==
On December 2, 2019, a school shooting took place in which a student armed with a pellet gun was wounded by a police officer.

On December 2–3, 2021, almost two weeks after the Waukesha Christmas Parade Tragedy, there was a heavy police presence at Waukesha South due to physical altercations between students.

== Extra-curricular activities ==
Waukesha South is one of three schools whose students participate in CORE 2062, a FIRST Robotics Competition team. The team won the Rookie All Star Award in 2007, the Wisconsin Regional (Milwaukee) in 2008, and the 10,000 Lakes Regional (Minneapolis) in 2010. In 2008, they also won the World Safety Award, the Wisconsin Regional Safety Award, the St. Louis Safety Award, the Entrepreneurship Award, the Website Award, in 2009 they won two Safety Awards, two Quality Awards, and an Animation Award. In 2015 CORE 2062 won regionals twice and made it to the FIRST World Championship in St. Louis. In 2019 they won the Chairman's Award, the most prestigious award in FIRST Robotics Competition and attended the world championships in Detroit.

The Blackshirt Student Newspaper, or The Blackshirt, is an online student-run school newspaper. Founded in 2017 by a couple of students, the student-run publication has gone on to complete interviews with Olympic Athlete Whitney Ashley and Max Temkin, a Forbes 30 Under 30 alumn & cofounder of the popular card game Cards Against Humanity.

Waukesha South also produces The Blackshirt Briefing, a student-run news and entertainment program shown periodically in homeroom classes and published on YouTube. The broadcast provides school-related announcements, sports updates, coverage of clubs and student activities, and occasionally features short comedic skits.

The Academic Decathlon team took 3rd place in state competition in 2011 and was 1st among Division 1 schools.

Waukesha South's novice debate team placed seventh at state in 2010 and one of its members, Sam Foat, won Top Negative Speaker. South also had a Lincoln-Douglas debater qualify individually. The forensics team had all but one member qualify for state in 2011 and all achieved high honors.

In September 2011 South restarted Key Club. It is an avid volunteer group throughout the community with about 50 members. They have helped out with many charity events throughout the community including Apple Harvest Festival, Waukesha Artful Bowls, Minooka Mash, and Salvation Army bell ringing. As the school year progresses Waukesha South Key Club plans on having many more volunteer projects ahead.

Waukesha South also has a Mock Trial team, which advanced to the State competition in 2019 as the runner-up in their region. They placed third in their region in 2020, but no State competition was held that year due to the COVID-19 pandemic. In their virtual 2021 season, they had gone undefeated and advanced to the National Mock Trial Championship, where they placed 13th in the country. In the 2022 season, they placed 5th at State after coming 1st in their region.

=== Athletics ===
South is a member of the Woodland Conference for most athletics, after having previously been a member of the Classic 8 Conference from its inception in 1997 to 2025. South's boys' swim team won the state championship in 2010, 2011, and 2017, and placed second in 2020. The girls' swim team won the state championships in 2011, 2012, and 2013, and placed third at the state meet in 2009 and second in 2010. In 2020, South was the host of the state girls’ championship, and has been the host of the state boys' championship since 2021.

Waukesha South's sports include:

- Baseball
- Basketball (boys and girls}
- Cheerleading
- Cross country (boys and girls)
- Dance team
- Diving (boys and girls)
- Football
- Gymnastics (co-op team with West and North)
- Ice hockey (boys and girls, co-op teams with North, West and Kettle Moraine (girls)
- Lacrosse (boys and girls, co-op team with West and North)
- Soccer (boys and girls)
- Softball
- Swimming (boys and girls, co-op teams with CMH (boys) and Mukwonago (girls)
- Tennis (boys and girls)
- Track & field (boys and girls)
- Volleyball (boys and girls)
- Wrestling

Waukesha South athletes, coaches, and fans won the Classic 8 Sportsmanship Award in 2015, 2016, and 2017.

=== Athletic conference affiliation history ===
- Suburban Conference (1925-1985)
- Braveland Conference (1985-1993)
- Southeast Conference (1993-1997)
- Classic 8 Conference (1997-2025)
- Woodland Conference (2025–present)

== Bands ==
Waukesha South's Bands, the Waukesha South Blackshirt Bands, include Concert, Wind & Symphonic, Jazz, Marching, and several ensembles. The band curriculum focuses on music performance and music theory. The bands travel to local, domestic, and international venues. Locations have included Switzerland in 1974; England in 1998; New Orleans, Texas, and Florida in 2009; England, California, and Australia in 2011; and China in 2007.

== Orchestras ==
Waukesha South's Orchestras include two skill levels; Symphony, and Chamber. Both orchestras work together to focus on music theory, performance etiquette and musical technique in solo and ensemble performance. Orchestra performances periodically involve winds, brass, and percussion instruments to create a full symphony orchestra. The string players perform together within the community to boost awareness of the musical program. Community gigs includes partnership performances with the Waukesha Public Library, and an annual Flash Mob on opening night of Downtown Waukesha's Friday Night Live.

The full Waukesha South Orchestra performed in collaboration with Milwaukee band, I'm Not A Pilot in May 2015. The full Waukesha South Orchestra and indie rock band played a total of eight original I'm Not A Pilot songs.

== Notable alumni ==
- John Anderson, former Green Bay Packer, sports announcer
- Frank Caliendo, former MADtv star and impressionist
- Will Durst, political satirist and stand-up comic
- Morgan Hamm, Olympic Silver-medalist in gymnastics
- Paul Hamm, Olympic Gold-medalist in gymnastics
- Sue Hawk, TV show contestant on Survivor: Borneo
- Gwen Jorgenson, triathlete and Olympic Gold-medalist
- Sam Llanas, musician, BoDeans
- Erinn Lobdell, TV show contestant on Survivor: Tocantins
- Mark Mallman, rock pianist
- Kurt Neumann, musician, BoDeans
- Nik Rettinger, Wisconsin state legislator
- Michelle Thaller, astronomer and assistant director for Science Communication at NASA
