= Woodland Conference =

Wisconsin high school athletic conference

The Woodland Conference is a high school athletic conference with its geographic footprint in southeastern Wisconsin. Founded in 1993, the Woodland Conference and its members are affiliated with the Wisconsin Interscholastic Athletic Association.

== History ==
=== 1993-2006 ===
Location of Original Woodland Conference Members

The Woodland Conference was formed in 1993 by nine medium-sized high schools in the Milwaukee metropolitan area: Brookfield Central, Brookfield East, Cudahy, Franklin, Greendale, Greenfield, South Milwaukee, Wauwatosa East and Wauwatosa West. Six of the original members came from two area conferences that disbanded the year prior: the Braveland Conference (Brookfield Central and Brookfield East) and the Suburban Park Conference (Cudahy, Greendale, Greenfield and South Milwaukee). Franklin was formerly in the Parkland Conference, and Wauwatosa East and Wauwatosa West were former members of the North Shore Conference. The original membership roster remained intact for the first four years of the conference's history before major realignment occurred in 1997. Five schools left the Woodland conference that year: three became charter members of the new Greater Metro Conference (Brookfield Central, Brookfield East and Wauwatosa East) and two went to the Southeast Conference (Franklin and South Milwaukee). These four schools were replaced by three schools formerly in the Parkland Conference (New Berlin Eisenhower, New Berlin West and Whitnall) and Thomas More from the Metro Conference. The entry of Thomas More into the Woodland Conference coincided with the merger between the public schools of the WIAA and the private schools in the Wisconsin Independent Schools Athletic Association.

=== 2006-2014 ===
In 2006, the Woodland Conference welcomed four schools displaced by the cessation of the Parkland Conference: Brown Deer, Pewaukee, Shorewood and St. Francis. To accommodate the expansion from eight to twelve members, the Woodland Conference subdivided along geographic lines:

North Division	South Division
Brown Deer	Cudahy
New Berlin Eisenhower	Greendale
New Berlin West	Greenfield
Pewaukee	St. Francis
Shorewood	Thomas More
Wauwatosa West	Whitnall

In 2009, South Milwaukee returned to the Woodland Conference after being dissatisfied by the competitive imbalance they experienced as members of the Southeast Conference. The conference realigned again, with larger schools in the conference comprising the Black Division and smaller ones in the Blue Division:

Black Division	Blue Division
Greendale	Brown Deer
Greenfield	Cudahy
New Berlin Eisenhower	New Berlin West
South Milwaukee	Pewaukee
Wauwatosa West	Shorewood
Whtnall	St. Francis
	Thomas More

After three years of this arrangement, the Woodland Conference realigned by geography into East and West Divisions in 2012. Pius XI also joined that year after leaving the Classic 8 Conference, replacing Thomas More after they joined the new Metro Classic Conference:

East Division	West Division
Brown Deer	Greendale
Cudahy	New Berlin Eisenhower
Greenfield	New Berlin West
Shorewood	Pewaukee
South Milwaukee	Pius XI
St. Francis	Wauwatosa West
Whitnall	

=== 2014-2026 ===
St. Francis left the Woodland Conference in 2014 to join with smaller schools in the Midwest Classic Conference. In 2017, the Woodland Conference lost Wauwatosa West to the Greater Metro Conference, exchanging affiliations with newcomers West Allis Central. Milwaukee Lutheran joined the Woodland Conference after two decades as members of the North Shore Conference, along with Wisconsin Lutheran following the dissolution of the Wisconsin Little Ten Conference. Milwaukee Lutheran became members of the East Division, and West Allis Central and Wisconsin Lutheran joined the West Division:

East Division	West Division
Brown Deer	Greendale
Cudahy	New Berlin Eisenhower
Greenfield	New Berlin West
Milwaukee Lutheran	Pewaukee
Shorewood	Pius XI
South Milwaukee	West Allis Central
Whitnall	Wisconsin Lutheran

The Woodland Conference has expanded its membership roster to sixteen schools in 2025, accepting Waukesha North and Waukesha South from the Classic 8 Conference. Both schools will be joining the West Division, with West Allis Central moving to the East Division to keep membership at eight schools per division.

=== 2026-present ===
In October 2025, the WIAA fast-tracked a plan for Woodland Conference to split into two separate organizations along divisional lines. The eight schools in the Eastern Division (Brown Deer, Cudahy, Greenfield, Milwaukee Lutheran, Shorewood, South Milwaukee, West Allis Central and Whitnall) will remain in the Woodland Conference and be joined by two newcomers, Augustine Prep in Milwaukee and Nathan Hale in West Allis. The eight schools in the Woodland's Western Division split off into a new conference that initially revived the Parkland Conference name for all sports before changing to the Park Ridge Conference in July 2026.

=== Football-only alignment ===
In February 2019, in conjunction with the Wisconsin Football Coaches Association, the WIAA released a sweeping football-only realignment for Wisconsin to commence with the 2020 football season and run on a two-year cycle. The eight-member conference originally referred to as the Woodland East featured Cudahy, Grafton, Greendale, Greenfield, Shorewood/Messmer, South Milwaukee, Whitnall and Wisconsin Lutheran as its original members. All members with the exception of Grafton (whose primary affiliation is with the North Shore Conference) were full members of the Woodland Conference. Another conference that was first called the Woodland West changed its name to the Parkland Conference before competition began, reviving a name previously used for an all-sport conference from 1963 to 2006. Membership remained intact for the first four seasons of play before changes were made for the 2024-2025 cycle. Cudahy was moved to the large-schools division of the Midwest Classic Conference, with full Woodland members Milwaukee Lutheran moving over from the Parkland Football Conference as their replacement. For the 2026-2027 realignment cycle, the Woodland Conference will be losing three members: Grafton (Glacier Trails), Shorewood/Messmer (Midwest Classic) and Wisconsin Lutheran (North Shore). They will be replaced by the two high schools in West Allis, with Nathan Hale joining from the Greater Metro Conference and West Allis Central moving over from the Park Ridge Conference. Along with the Park Ridge Conference, the Woodland Conference will have seven schools each and play one mandatory crossover game per school.

== List of conference members ==
=== Current full members ===
School	Location	Affiliation	Enrollment	Mascot	Colors	Joined
Augustine Prep South	Milwaukee, WI	Private (Christian)	939	Lions		2026
Brown Deer	Brown Deer, WI	Public	525	Falcons		2006
Cudahy	Cudahy, WI	Public	620	Packers		1993
Greenfield	Greenfield, WI	Public	1,122	Hustlin' Hawks		1993
Milwaukee Lutheran	Milwaukee, WI	Private (LCMS)	913	Red Knights		2017
Nathan Hale	West Allis, WI	Public	1,214	Huskies		2026
Shorewood	Shorewood, WI	Public	599	Greyhounds		2006
South Milwaukee	South Milwaukee, WI	Public	935	Rockets		1993, 2009
West Allis Central	West Allis, WI	Public	1,023	Bulldogs		2017
Whitnall	Greenfield, WI	Public	807	Falcons		1997

=== Current associate members ===
School	Location	Affiliation	Mascot	Colors	Primary Conference	Sport(s)
Greendale	Greendale, WI	Public	Panthers		Park Ridge	Football
Waukesha North	Waukesha, WI	Public	Northstars		Park Ridge	Boys Swim & Dive
Waukesha South	Waukesha, WI	Public	Blackshirts		Park Ridge	Boys Swim & Dive

=== Current co-operative members ===
Team	Colors	Host School	Co-operative Members	Sport(s)
New Berlin United		New Berlin West	New Berlin Eisenhower	Boys Swim & Dive
West Allis United		Varies by sport	Nathan Hale, West Allis Central	Boys Soccer, Softball, Boys Tennis, Girls Tennis, Boys Volleyball
West Allis Wave		West Allis Central	Nathan Hale, Martin Luther	Boys Swim & Dive, Girls Swim & Dive

=== Former full members ===
School	Location	Affiliation	Mascot	Colors	Joined	Left	Conference Joined	Current Conference
Brookfield Central	Brookfield, WI	Public	Lancers		1993	1997	Greater Metro	
Brookfield East	Brookfield, WI	Public	Spartans		1993	1997	Greater Metro	
Franklin	Franklin, WI	Public	Sabers		1993	1997	Southeast	
Greendale	Greendale, WI	Public	Panthers		1993	2026	Park Ridge	
New Berlin Eisenhower	New Berlin, WI	Public	Lions		1997	2026	Park Ridge	
New Berlin West	New Berlin, WI	Public	Vikings		1997	2026	Park Ridge	
Pewaukee	Pewaukee, WI	Public	Pirates		2006	2026	Park Ridge	
Pius XI	Milwaukee, WI	Private (Catholic)	Popes		2012	2026	Park Ridge	
St. Francis	St. Francis, WI	Public	Mariners		2006	2014	Midwest Classic	
St. Thomas More	Milwaukee, WI	Private (Catholic)	Cavaliers		1997	2012	Metro Classic	
Waukesha North	Waukesha, WI	Public	Northstars		2025	2026	Park Ridge	
Waukesha South	Waukesha, WI	Public	Blackshirts		2025	2026	Park Ridge	
Wauwatosa East	Wauwatosa, WI	Public	Red Raiders		1993	1997	Greater Metro	
Wauwatosa West	Wauwatosa, WI	Public	Trojans		1993	2017	Greater Metro	
Wisconsin Lutheran	Milwaukee, WI	Private (WELS)	Vikings		2017	2026	Park Ridge	

=== Former football-only members ===
School	Location	Affiliation	Mascot	Colors	Seasons	Primary Conference
Grafton	Grafton, WI	Public	Black Hawks		2020-2025	North Shore

== Membership timeline ==
=== Full members ===
North Division South Division Black Division Blue Division East Division West Division

=== Football members ===
North Division South Division Black Division Blue Division East Division West Division

== Membership map ==
Woodland Conference
Location of Woodland Conference full members:
1 Augustine Prep South
2 Brown Deer
3 Cudahy
4 Greenfield
5 Milwaukee Lutheran
6 Nathan Hale
7 Shorewood
8 South Milwaukee
9 West Allis Central
10 Whitnall

== Sanctioned sports ==
	Baseball	Boys Basketball	Girls Basketball	Boys Cross Country	Girls Cross Country	Football	Boys Golf	Boys Soccer	Girls Soccer	Softball	Boys Swim & Dive	Girls Swim & Dive	Boys Tennis	Girls Tennis	Boys Track & Field	Girls Track & Field	Boys Volleyball	Girls Volleyball	Boys Wrestling	Girls Wrestling
Augustine Prep South	●	●	●	●	●			●	●	●	●	●			●	●	●	●		
Brown Deer	●	●	●	●	●		●	●	●	● (Note: Co-operative with Nicolet, Shorewood and University School)	● (Note: Co-operative with University School)	●	●	●	●	●	●	●	● (Note: Co-operative with Messmer and Shorewood)	●
Cudahy	●	●	●	● (Note: Co-operative with St. Francis)	●			●	●	●	● (Note: Co-operative with St. Francis and St. Thomas More)	●	●	●	●	●		●	●	●
Greenfield	●	●	●	●	●	●	●	●	●	●	● (Note: Co-operative with Greendale, Pius XI and Wisconsin Lutheran)	● (Note: Co-operative with Pius XI and Wisconsin Lutheran)	●	●	●	●	●	●	●	●
Milwaukee Lutheran	●	●	●	●		●	●	●		●	● (Note: Co-operative with Heritage Christian and Lake Country Lutheran)	● (Note: Co-operative with Brookfield Academy and Heritage Christian)	● (Note: Co-operative with Lake Country Lutheran)	●	●	●		●	● (Note: Co-operative with Heritage Christian)	●
Nathan Hale	●	●	●	●	●	●	●		●	● (Note: West Allis United co-operative)			●	●	●	●		●	●	●
Shorewood	●	●	●	●	●		●	●	●		●	●	●	●	●	●	●	●		
South Milwaukee	●	●	●	●	●	●	●	●	●	●	●	●	●	●	●	●	● (Note: Co-operative with Milwaukee Reagan and St. Thomas More)	●	●	●
West Allis Central	●	●	●	●	●	●	●	●	●		● (Note: West Allis Wave co-operative)	●			●	●	●	●	●	●
Whitnall	●	●	●	●	●	●	●	●	●	●	●	●	●	●	●	●	●	●	●	●

== List of state champions ==
=== Fall sports ===
Boys Cross Country
School	Year	Division
Shorewood	2006	Division 2
Shorewood	2009	Division 2
Shorewood	2010	Division 2
Shorewood	2012	Division 2
Pewaukee	2015	Division 2
Shorewood	2021	Division 2

Girls Cross Country
School	Year	Division
Pewaukee	2009	Division 2
Pewaukee	2015	Division 2
Shorewood	2019	Division 2

Football
School	Year	Division
Cudahy	1994	Division 2

Boys Soccer
School	Year	Division
Saint Thomas More	2006	Division 3
Pius XI	2018	Division 3
Shorewood	2019	Division 3
Shorewood	2021	Division 3
New Berlin Eisenhower	2022	Division 3

Girls Swimming & Diving
School	Year	Division
Whitnall	1999	Division 2
Whitnall	2000	Division 2
Shorewood	2012	Division 2

Girls Tennis
School	Year	Division
Greendale	1994	Division 2
Greendale	1997	Division 2
Greendale	1999	Division 2

Girls Volleyball
School	Year	Division
Wauwatosa East	1994	Division 1
Thomas More	1999	Division 1 (WISAA)
Thomas More	2000	Division 2

=== Winter sports ===
Boys Basketball
School	Year	Division
New Berlin West	2000	Division 2
New Berlin Eisenhower	2008	Division 2
Brown Deer	2014	Division 3
Brown Deer	2015	Division 3
Pewaukee	2021	Division 2
Pewaukee	2022	Division 2
Pewaukee	2023	Division 2
Wisconsin Lutheran	2024	Division 2
Wisconsin Lutheran	2025	Division 2
Wisconsin Lutheran	2026	Division 1

Girls Basketball
School	Year	Division
New Berlin Eisenhower	2010	Division 2
Pius XI	2015	Division 2
New Berlin Eisenhower	2016	Division 2
Pewaukee	2024	Division 2

Boys Swimming & Diving
School	Year	Division
Brookfield Central	1994	Division 2
Brookfield Central	1995	Division 2
Brookfield East	1996	Division 2

=== Spring sports ===
Baseball
School	Year	Division
Pewaukee	2026	Division 2

Girls Soccer
School	Year	Division
Wauwatosa East	1996	
Wauwatosa East	1997	Division 1
New Berlin Eisenhower	2022	Division 3

Softball
School	Year	Division
South Milwaukee	1998	Division 1
Greendale	2006	Division 2
New Berlin Eisenhower	2008	Division 2
New Berlin West	2016	Division 2
Whitnall	2018	Division 2

Boys Tennis
School	Year	Division
Greendale	1995	Division 2
Brookfield Central	1996	Division 1
Greendale	2005	Division 2

Boys Track & Field
School	Year	Division
Brown Deer	2008	Division 2
Shorewood	2013	Division 2
Shorewood	2022	Division 2

Girls Track & Field
School	Year	Division
Brown Deer	2007	Division 2
Wisconsin Lutheran	2019	Division 2
Shorewood	2022	Division 2

=== Summer sports ===
Baseball
School	Year
Greendale	1995
South Milwaukee	1996
Wauwatosa East	1997
New Berlin West	2013

== List of conference champions ==
=== Boys Basketball ===
School	Quantity	Years
New Berlin Eisenhower	10	2003, 2006, 2007, 2008, 2009, 2010, 2011, 2013, 2016, 2020
Pewaukee	10	2008, 2009, 2010, 2012, 2017, 2018, 2020, 2021, 2022, 2023
Whitnall	10	2008, 2009, 2011, 2012, 2017, 2018, 2021, 2022, 2023, 2024
Brown Deer	7	2008, 2013, 2014, 2015, 2016, 2017, 2018
Greenfield	5	1999, 2004, 2007, 2019, 2025
Wisconsin Lutheran	5	2020, 2022, 2024, 2025, 2026
New Berlin West	4	2000, 2005, 2008, 2011
Saint Thomas More	4	1998, 2001, 2002, 2012
Wauwatosa East	4	1994, 1995, 1996, 1997
Greendale	2	1996, 2007
Pius XI	2	2014, 2015
Wauwatosa West	2	2003, 2011
West Allis Central	2	2019, 2026
Milwaukee Lutheran	1	2020
South Milwaukee	1	2011
Augustine Prep South	0	
Brookfield Central	0	
Brookfield East	0	
Cudahy	0	
Franklin	0	
Nathan Hale		
Shorewood	0	
St. Francis	0	
Waukesha North	0	
Waukesha South	0	

=== Girls Basketball ===
School	Quantity	Years
New Berlin Eisenhower	11	2002, 2007, 2009, 2010, 2011, 2012, 2013, 2017, 2018, 2019, 2021
Pewaukee	10	2008, 2010, 2011, 2012, 2021, 2022, 2023, 2024, 2025, 2026
Greendale	7	1996, 1997, 1999, 2001, 2005, 2006, 2007
Pius XI	6	2013, 2014, 2015, 2016, 2020, 2022
South Milwaukee	6	1995, 2013, 2019, 2020, 2021, 2022
Whitnall	6	1997, 2008, 2009, 2024, 2025, 2026
Cudahy	4	2003, 2004, 2007, 2017
Shorewood	4	2014, 2015, 2016, 2018
Greenfield	2	2021, 2023
Saint Thomas More	2	1998, 2000
New Berlin West	1	2017
Wauwatosa East	1	1995
Augustine Prep South		
Brookfield Central	0	
Brookfield East	0	
Brown Deer	0	
Franklin	0	
Milwaukee Lutheran	0	
Nathan Hale		
St. Francis	0	
Waukesha North	0	
Waukesha South	0	
Wauwatosa West	0	
West Allis Central	0	
Wisconsin Lutheran	0	

=== Football ===
School	Quantity	Years
Greendale	11	2002, 2005, 2006, 2007, 2010, 2011, 2013, 2014, 2015, 2021, 2026
New Berlin Eisenhower	10	2002, 2003, 2006, 2007 2009, 2015, 2016, 2017, 2018, 2019
Cudahy	7	1993, 1994, 1996, 1997, 1998, 1999, 2001
Pewaukee	5	2008, 2009, 2011, 2012, 2016
Whitnall	5	1998, 2000, 2012, 2017, 2019
Brown Deer	4	2007, 2010, 2012, 2014
Grafton	4	2022, 2023, 2024, 2025
South Milwaukee	3	2012, 2013, 2014
Greenfield	3	2015, 2016, 2026
New Berlin West	1	2019
Saint Thomas More	1	2004
Shorewood/ Messmer	1	2018
Wauwatosa East	1	1995
Wisconsin Lutheran	1	2023
Brookfield Central	0	
Brookfield East	0	
Franklin	0	
Milwaukee Lutheran	0	
Nathan Hale		
Pius XI	0	
St. Francis	0	
Wauwatosa West	0	
West Allis Central	0	
