= Greater Metro Conference =

Wisconsin high school athletic conference

- Conference: WIAA
- Commissioner: Brian A. Henson
- No. of teams: 9 (8 in 2027)
- Headquarters: Brookfield, Wisconsin
- Website: www.greatermetroconference.com

The Greater Metro Conference is a high school athletics conference with its membership base in southeastern Wisconsin. Formed in 1997, the conference and its member schools belong to the Wisconsin Interscholastic Athletic Association.

== History ==
The Greater Metro Conference was founded in 1997 by nine large high schools in the greater Milwaukee area: Brookfield Central, Brookfield East, Divine Savior Holy Angels, Marquette University, Menomonee Falls, Nathan Hale, Sussex Hamilton, Wauwatosa East and West Allis Central. Brookfield Central, Brookfield East and Wauwatosa West were former Woodland Conference members, Nathan Hale and West Allis Central were late of the Southeast Conference, Menomonee Falls came from the North Shore Conference and Sussex Hamilton was previously in the Parkland Conference. Divine Savior Holy Angels and Marquette University were both former members of the Metro Conference, a conference for private high schools affiliated with the Wisconsin Independent Schools Athletic Association. The Metro Conference was dissolved in anticipation of the coming merger between the WIAA and WISAA. Membership remained stable for the first twenty years of the Greater Metro Conference's existence, with the only changes coming in 2017. Germantown joined from the North Shore Conference, and Wauwatosa West swapped affiliations with West Allis Central, with the latter moving on to the Woodland Conference. In November 2025, it was announced that Nathan Hale will be exiting the Greater Metro Conference as part of a realignment plan that will add them and Augustine Prep South to the Woodland Conference and create the new Park Ridge Conference from the Woodland's Western Division. Both of these moves took effect for the 2026-27 school year. In March 2026, the WIAA's Board of Controls approved a realignment plan that will see Germantown and Menomonee Falls return to the North Shore Conference for the 2027-28 school year, coupled with the addition of Oak Creek from the Classic 8 Conference. One month later, when the WIAA released their final realignment package, Sussex Hamilton was moved to the Classic 8 Conference with Franklin moving over from the Southeast Conference as their replacement.

=== Football-only alignment ===
In February 2019, in conjunction with the Wisconsin Football Coaches Association, the WIAA released a sweeping football-only realignment for Wisconsin to commence with the 2020 football season and run on a two-year cycle. The Greater Metro Conference entered the 2020 season with eight members for football. Seven members were also full members of the conference (Brookfield Central, Brookfield East, Germantown, Marquette University, Menomonee Falls, Nathan Hale and Sussex Hamilton), with former full members West Allis Central returning as a football-only member. Full Greater Metro members Wauwatosa East and Wauwatosa West were placed into the newly revived Parkland Conference for football. This alignment lasted through the 2022-2023 realignment cycle before further changes were made. West Allis Central shifted their football affiliation to the Parkland Football Conference, and the conference decreased to seven members for football. The Greater Metro Conference also entered into a scheduling partnership with the Classic 8 Conference to play one interconference game per school counting towards the overall conference standings. For the 2026-2027 cycle, the Greater Metro Conference will be losing Menomonee Falls to the North Shore Conference and Nathan Hale to the Woodland Conference. Catholic Memorial, associate members in the Parkland Football Conference, will be joining as their replacement and the interlocking conference schedules will now include two crossover games with the decrease in members.

== List of conference members ==
=== Current full members ===
School	Location	Affiliation	Enrollment	Mascot	Colors	Joined
Brookfield Central	Brookfield, WI	Public	1,164	Lancers		1997
Brookfield East	Brookfield, WI	Public	1,393	Spartans		1997
Divine Savior Holy Angels	Milwaukee, WI	Private (Catholic)	646 (Girls only)	Dashers		1997
Germantown (Note: Joining the North Shore Conference for the 2027-28 school year)	Germantown, WI	Public	1,275	Warhawks		2017
Hamilton (Note: Joining the Classic 8 Conference for the 2027-28 school year)	Sussex, WI	Public	1,513	Chargers		1997
Marquette University	Milwaukee, WI	Private (Catholic, Jesuit)	940 (Boys only)	Hilltoppers		1997
Menomonee Falls	Menomonee Falls, WI	Public	1,218	Phoenix		1997
Wauwatosa East	Wauwatosa, WI	Public	1,042	Red Raiders		1997
Wauwatosa West	Wauwatosa, WI	Public	913	Trojans		2017

=== Current associate members ===
School	Location	Affiliation	Mascot	Colors	Primary Conference	Sport(s)
Arrowhead	Hartland, WI	Public	Warhawks		Classic 8	Boys Swimming & Diving
Catholic Memorial	Waukesha, WI	Private (Catholic)	Crusaders		Classic 8	Football
Elkhorn	Elkhorn, WI	Public	Elks		Southern Lakes	Boys Lacrosse (Note: Co-operative with Badger, Burlington, Delavan-Darien and Williams Bay)
Franklin	Franklin, WI	Public	Sabers		Southeast	Boys Lacrosse, Girls Lacrosse (Note: Co-operative with Greenfield)
Muskego	Muskego, WI	Public	Warriors		Classic 8	Boys Swimming & Diving
Oak Creek	Oak Creek, WI	Public	Knights		Classic 8	Boys Lacrosse, Girls Lacrosse, Boys Swimming & Diving
Port Washington	Port Washington, WI	Public	Pirates		Glacier Trails	Gymnastics
Shorewood	Shorewood, WI	Public	Greyhounds		Woodland	Gymnastics (Note: Co-operative with University School)
Waukesha West	Waukesha, WI	Public	Wolverines		Classic 8	Boys Swimming & Diving
Waupun	Waupun, WI	Public	Warriors		Capitol	Gymnastics

=== Current co-operative members ===
Team	Colors	Host School	Co-operative Members	Sport(s)
Brookfield Lacrosse		Varies	Brookfield Central, Brookfield East	Boys Lacrosse, (Note: Hosted by Brookfield Central) Girls Lacrosse (Note: Hosted by Brookfield East)
Kenosha Shoremen		Kenosha Bradford	Kenosha Indian Trail, Kenosha Tremper, Westosha Central	Boys Lacrosse
Wauwatosa Blazers		Wauwatosa East	Wauwatosa West, Heritage Christian (boys only), Milwaukee Rufus King (boys only)	Boys Lacrosse, Girls Lacrosse
West Allis Gymnastics		Nathan Hale	West Allis Central, DSHA	Gymnastics
West Bend Gymnastics		West Bend East	West Bend West	Gymnastics

=== Future full members ===
School	Location	Affiliation	Enrollment	Mascot	Colors	Joining	Former Conference
Franklin	Franklin, WI	Public	1,621	Sabers		2027	Southeast
Oak Creek	Oak Creek, WI	Public	2,151	Knights		2027	Classic 8

=== Former members ===
School	Location	Affiliation	Mascot	Colors	Joined	Left	Conference Joined	Current Conference
Nathan Hale	West Allis, WI	Public	Huskies		1997	2026	Woodland	
West Allis Central	West Allis, WI	Public	Bulldogs		1997	2017	Woodland	

=== Former football-only members ===
School	Location	Affiliation	Mascot	Colors	Seasons	Primary Conference
West Allis Central	West Allis, WI	Public	Bulldogs		2020-2023	Woodland

== Membership map ==
Greater Metro Conference
Location of Greater Metro Conference full members:
1 Brookfield Central
2 Brookfield East
3 Divine Savior Holy Angels
4 Germantown
5 Hamilton
6 Marquette University
7 Menomonee Falls
8 Wauwatosa East
9 Wauwatosa West

== Sponsored sports ==
	Baseball	Boys Basketball	Girls Basketball	Boys Cross Country	Girls Cross Country	Football	Boys Golf	Girls Golf	Gymnastics	Boys Lacrosse	Girls Lacrosse	Boys Soccer	Girls Soccer	Softball	Boys Swim & Dive	Girls Swim & Dive	Boys Tennis	Girls Tennis	Boys Track & Field	Girls Track & Field	Boys Volleyball	Girls Volleyball	Boys Wrestling	Girls Wrestling
Brookfield Central	●	●	●	●	●	●	●	●		● (Note: Brookfield Lacrosse co-operative)		●	●	●	● (Note: Co-operative with Brookfield East)	●	●	●	●	●	●	●	●	●
Brookfield East	●	●	●	●	●	●	●	●	● (Note: Co-operative with Brookfield Central)		●	●	●	●		●	●	●	●	●	●	●	●	●
DSHA			●		●			●			●		●	●		●		●		●		●		
Germantown	●	●	●	●	●	●	●	●				●	●	●	●	●	●	●	●	●	●	●	●	●
Hamilton	●	●	●	●	●	●	●	●		● (Note: Co-operative with Germantown and Menomonee Falls)	●	●	●	●			●	●	●	●	●	●	●	●
Marquette University	●	●		●		●	●			●		●			●		●		●		●		●	
Menomonee Falls	●	●	●	●	●		●	●	● (Note: Co-operative with Germantown)			●	●	●	● (Note: Co-operative with Hamilton)	●	●	●	●	●	●	●	●	●
Wauwatosa East	●	●	●	●	●		● (Note: Co-operative with Wauwatosa West)	●		● (Note: Wauwatosa Blazers co-operative)	●	●	●	●		●	●	●	●	●	●	●		
Wauwatosa West	●	●	●	●	●							●	●	●	● (Note: Co-operative with Wauwatosa East)	●	●	●	●	●	●	●	●	●

== List of state champions ==
=== Fall sports ===
Boys Cross Country
School	Year	Division
Marquette University	1997	Division 1 (WISAA)
Marquette University	1998	Division 1 (WISAA)
Nathan Hale	2000	Division 1
Brookfield Central	2009	Division 1

Football
School	Year	Division
Marquette University	1997	Division 1 (WISAA)
Marquette University	1999	Division 1 (WISAA)
Marquette University	2009	Division 1
Brookfield East	2016	Division 2
Brookfield East	2019	Division 2
Marquette University	2023	Division 1

Girls Golf
School	Year	Division
Brookfield Central	2003	Division 1
Brookfield Central	2020	Division 1
DSHA	2023	Division 1
DSHA	2024	Division 1

Boys Soccer
School	Year	Division
Brookfield East	1997	Division 1
Marquette University	1997	Division 1 (WISAA)
Marquette University	1998	Division 1 (WISAA)
Wauwatosa East	1998	Division 1
Marquette University	1999	Division 1 (WISAA)
Marquette University	2000	Division 1
Marquette University	2001	Division 1
Marquette University	2002	Division 1
Marquette University	2003	Division 1
Marquette University	2005	Division 1
Marquette University	2008	Division 1
Marquette University	2010	Division 1
Marquette University	2011	Division 1
Marquette University	2012	Division 1
Brookfield East	2014	Division 2
Marquette University	2014	Division 1
Marquette University	2015	Division 1
Marquette University	2016	Division 1
Marquette University	2017	Division 1
Marquette University	2018	Division 1
Brookfield Central	2019	Division 2
Marquette University	2020	Division 1
Marquette University	2021	Division 1

Girls Swimming & Diving
School	Year	Division
Brookfield East	2019	Division 1
Brookfield East	2020	Division 1
Brookfield East	2021	Division 1

Girls Tennis
School	Year	Division
DSHA	1998	Division 1 (WISAA)
DSHA	1999	Division 1 (WISAA)
DSHA	2001	Division 1
Brookfield Central	2002	Division 1
Brookfield Central	2003	Division 1
DSHA	2004	Division 1
Brookfield Central	2006	Division 1
Brookfield East	2024	Division 1

Boys Volleyball
School	Year
Marquette University	2002
Marquette University	2004
Marquette University	2005
Marquette University	2006
Marquette University	2007
Marquette University	2008
Marquette University	2011
Marquette University	2013
Marquette University	2014
Marquette University	2017
Germantown	2018
Marquette University	2021
Hamilton	2024

Girls Volleyball
School	Year	Division
Nathan Hale	1998	Division 1
DSHA	2001	Division 1
Menomonee Falls	2013	Division 1
DSHA	2014	Division 1
DSHA	2015	Division 1
Hamilton	2020	Division 1
DSHA	2022	Division 1
DSHA	2023	Division 1
DSHA	2024	Division 1

=== Winter sports ===
Boys Basketball
School	Year	Division
Marquette University	1999	Division 1 (WISAA)
Wauwatosa East	2008	Division 1
Brookfield Central	2019	Division 1
Wauwatosa East	2021	Division 1
Marquette University	2024	Division 1

Girls Basketball
School	Year	Division
DSHA	2015	Division 1
Germantown	2021	Division 1

Boys Swimming & Diving
School	Year	Division
Brookfield East	1999	Division 2
Brookfield co-op	2022	Division 1

=== Spring sports ===
Boys Golf
School	Year	Division
Marquette University	2016	Division 1
Marquette University	2018	Division 1
Marquette University	2019	Division 1

Girls Soccer
School	Year	Division
Brookfield Central	2002	Division 1
Brookfield Central	2003	Division 1
Brookfield Central	2004	Division 1
Brookfield Central	2005	Division 2
DSHA	2008	Division 1
DSHA	2009	Division 1
DSHA	2014	Division 1
DSHA	2016	Division 1
Brookfield Central	2017	Division 1
Brookfield Central	2018	Division 2
DSHA	2021	Division 1
DSHA	2026	Division 1
Brookfield Central	2026	Division 2

Softball
School	Year	Division
Hamilton	2026	Division 1

Boys Tennis
School	Year	Division
Marquette University	1998	Division 1 (WISAA)
Marquette University	1999	Division 1 (WISAA)
Brookfield Central	2000	Division 1
Brookfield Central	2001	Division 1
Marquette University	2002	Division 1
Marquette University	2003	Division 1
Marquette University	2007	Division 1
Marquette University	2008	Division 1
Marquette University	2009	Division 1
Marquette University	2010	Division 1
Marquette University	2011	Division 1
Marquette University	2012	Division 1
Marquette University	2013	Division 1
Brookfield East	2014	Division 1
Marquette University	2015	Division 1
Marquette University	2016	Division 1
Marquette University	2017	Division 1
Marquette University	2018	Division 1
Marquette University	2019	Division 1
Brookfield East	2021	Division 1
Brookfield East	2022	Division 1
Marquette University	2023	Division 1
Brookfield Central	2024	Division 1

Boys Track & Field
School	Year	Division
Brookfield East	2011	Division 1
Brookfield East	2012	Division 1
Brookfield East	2013	Division 1
Brookfield East	2016	Division 1
Marquette University	2026	Wheelchair

Girls Track & Field
School	Year	Division
Brookfield Central	2008	Division 1

=== Summer sports ===
Baseball
School	Year
Brookfield Central	2000
Marquette University	2006
Marquette University	2008
Brookfield Central	2014
Menomonee Falls	2015
Menomonee Falls	2016

== List of conference champions ==
=== Boys Basketball ===
School	Quantity	Years
Marquette University	10	1998, 1999, 2000, 2007, 2009, 2011, 2015, 2016, 2023, 2024
Wauwatosa East	10	1999, 2000, 2001, 2002, 2004, 2005, 2006, 2007, 2008, 2021
Brookfield Central	9	2002, 2003, 2013, 2014, 2017, 2018, 2020, 2025, 2026
Hamilton	3	2013, 2019, 2023
Wauwatosa West	3	2023, 2025, 2026
Menomonee Falls	2	2010, 2022
Brookfield East	1	2026
Germantown	1	2026
West Allis Central	1	2012
Nathan Hale	0	

=== Girls Basketball ===
School	Quantity	Years
DSHA	11	1998, 1999, 2000, 2001, 2002, 2006, 2007, 2010, 2014, 2015, 2016
Brookfield East	6	2003, 2004, 2022, 2023, 2024, 2025
Brookfield Central	5	2005, 2008, 2009, 2010, 2011
Germantown	4	2019, 2020, 2021, 2022
Hamilton	4	2012, 2013, 2017, 2018
Wauwatosa East	3	2006, 2025, 2026
Nathan Hale	2	2000, 2018
Menomonee Falls	1	1999
Wauwatosa West	0	
West Allis Central	0	

=== Football ===
School	Quantity	Years
Marquette University	16	1997, 1999, 2000, 2001, 2003, 2005, 2007, 2008, 2009, 2010, 2011, 2013, 2014, 2016, 2018, 2024
Brookfield Central	10	1998, 1999, 2002, 2006, 2008, 2011, 2015, 2016, 2017, 2019
Hamilton	6	2011, 2021, 2022, 2023, 2025, 2026
Menomonee Falls	3	2004, 2019, 2020
Brookfield East	2	2012, 2025
Germantown	1	2025
West Allis Central	1	1999
Catholic Memorial	0	
Nathan Hale	0	
Wauwatosa East	0	
Wauwatosa West	0	
