= Whitefish Bay High School =

Location
- 1200 East Fairmount Avenue; Whitefish Bay, Wisconsin 53217-6099; United States; 43.107520°N 87.895880°W

Information
- Type: Public secondary
- School district: Whitefish Bay School District
- Superintendent: Jamie Foeckler
- Principal: Amy Levek
- Staff: 60.86 (FTE)
- Grades: 9–12
- Enrollment: 906 (2023-2024)
- Student to teacher ratio: 16.05
- Colors: Blue and gray
- Athletics conference: North Shore Conference
- Nickname: Blue Dukes
- Newspaper: Tower Times
- Yearbook: Tower
- Website: WFBHS website

Whitefish Bay High School is a comprehensive public secondary school located in the village of Whitefish Bay, Wisconsin, United States. Enrollment is around 950 students, in grades 9 through 12.

The school newspaper, the Tower Times, and the school yearbook, The Tower, both refer to the school building's five-story tower and facade that rise over the main entrance. The central original building and tower, completed in 1932, were designed by Herbert W. Tullgren, a prominent Milwaukee architect.

The school colors are blue and grey. The school's mascot is the "Blue Duke". Whitefish Bay is a member of the North Shore Conference for athletic competition.

In their 2025 rankings, U.S. News & World Report ranked Whitefish Bay High School first in Wisconsin and #157 in the country.

== Activities ==
Student extracurricular activities include student government, forensics (individual events), debate, drama, and sports. A student activity fair is held in September to publicize clubs and activities.

=== Music ===
Whitefish Bay High School offers choir, orchestra and band programs to its students in all grades. The orchestra has biennial overseas concerts/trips and the band has an annual stateside trip for seniors.

=== Athletics ===
The school sports program offers the following sports:

- Boys: football, cross country, soccer, volleyball, skiing, basketball, track and field, tennis, baseball, swimming and diving, golf, and wrestling
- Girls: cross country, soccer, volleyball, skiing, basketball, track and field, tennis, softball, swimming and diving, golf, gymnastics, and wrestling

WFBHS won state championships in boys' cross country in 1955, 1957, 1961 and 1962.

==== Conference affiliation history ====
- Suburban Conference (1933-1985)
- North Shore Conference (1985–present)

== Notable alumni ==
- Nick Bellore - NFL football player
- Craig Counsell - Manager of the Chicago Cubs
- Richard W. Conway — industrial engineer, computer scientist, and emeritus in the Grad School of Management (Cornell)
- Brad Courtney - politician
- Randy Dean - NFL player, handball player at the 1976 Summer Olympics
- Robert Dean - handball player at the 1976 Summer Olympics
- J. D. Dix – baseball player
- Bernardine Rae Dohrn - co-founder of the Weather Underground
- Joel Ehrendreich - diplomat
- Matthea Harvey - poet
- Jeffrey Hunter - actor
- Kristen Johnston - actress
- Dennis Kois - museum director
- Bea Millan-Windorski - model
- Niels Mueller - screenwriter, director, producer
- Samuel Page - actor
- Mike Schneck - NFL player
- Donald K. Stitt - chair of the Republican Party of Wisconsin
- Meredith Tax - writer and political activist
- Chip Zien - actor
