= Nathan Hale High School (Wisconsin) =

Location
- 11601 W. Lincoln Avenue; West Allis, Wisconsin 53227; United States; 43.00137°N 88.05635°W

Information
- Type: Public Secondary
- Motto: Dedicated to Academic Excellence & Committed to Personal Achievement
- School district: School District of West Allis-West Milwaukee
- Superintendent: Paul Strobel
- Principal: Matthew Lesar
- Staff: 75.70 (FTE)
- Faculty: 110
- Grades: 9-12
- Enrollment: 1,208 (2023-2024)
- Student to teacher ratio: 15.96
- Hours in school day: 7
- Campus size: 65-acre (260,000 m^{2})
- Colors: Green and White
- Fight song: Across The Field ("Give a Cheer for Nathan Hale")
- Athletics conference: Greater Metro
- Mascot: Herbie The Husky (#07)
- Nickname: Huskies
- Rival: West Allis Central
- Newspaper: Husky Happenings
- Yearbook: Vigilant
- Website: hale.wawmsd.org

Nathan Hale High School is a public high school in West Allis, Wisconsin, located on Lincoln Avenue and South 116th Street. The school boundaries are the City of West Allis, Village of West Milwaukee as well as portions of New Berlin and Greenfield.

Nathan Hale High School runs on a 50-minute, 8 period, 2 semester schedule. The faculty is made of more than 100 faculty members including 5 guidance counselors and 6 administrators. Nathan Hale High School offers organizations including FBLA, Nathan Hale Mentors, HOSA, and DECA as well as clubs, such as Students for Saving the Earth, Key Club, DART, Bowling Club, Forensics, National Honor Society, German, French and Spanish Honors Societies, Drama Club, Magic the Gathering Club, Video Game Club, and more. Nathan Hale's rival is the West Allis Central Bulldogs.

== History ==
Nathan Hale High School was initially established in 1931 as an additional junior high school, requested in response to an ever-growing population of students. The first building for Hale still stands, as it is the current building for West Allis Central. Nathan Hale Junior High School was a title short lived, as the current name for the school was conceived in 1941, serving both junior and senior high schoolers alike until 1957. The school served those students at this location until 1968, when the current building was opened two miles to the west, prompting Central to move into Hale's original building in 1973. Central's first building was torn down and subsequently replaced with the current West Allis Public Library.

The current building for Nathan Hale has retained its stark, brutalist architecture of the 1960's, but not without renovations. In 1999, the cafeteria moved downstairs into its current location in the northeastern corner of the building. Traces of the old cafeteria are encased in the walls of the Mentoring Program homeroom, where water fountains are present. In the same year, an additional auxiliary gym was also constructed. In 2005, the school's current weight room was finished.

== Athletics ==
Despite Nathan Hale's direct rival being the Central Bulldogs, the two schools are not in the same athletic conference; Hale is a part of the Greater Metro Conference, while Central is a part of the Woodland Conference.

Boys sports include:

- Football
- Baseball
- Basketball
- Soccer
- Volleyball
- Wrestling
- Bowling
- Swimming and Diving
- Tennis
- Track and Field
- Golf
- Cross Country

Girls sports are:

- Basketball
- Softball
- Soccer
- Track and Field
- Tennis
- Cross Country
- Volleyball
- Gymnastics
- Swimming and Diving

=== Championships ===
Hale won a WIAA state championship in boys cross country in 1968.

The Girls Varsity Basketball Team won a Conference Championship in 2018.

The Boys Varsity Basketball Team won Conference Championships in 1989, 1991 and 1992.

The Varsity Football Team won a Conference Championship going undefeated for the season, and was the #1 ranked team in the State in 1952.

=== Conference affiliation history ===
- Suburban Conference (1942-1985)
- Suburban Park Conference (1985-1993)
- Southeast Conference (1993-1997)
- Greater Metro Conference (1997–present)

== Notable alumni ==
- Marisabel Cabrera, circuit court judge and former member of the Wisconsin State Assembly
- Paul Melotik, member of the Wisconsin State Assembly and of various legislative bodies in Ozaukee County
- Chris Scheels, Olympic speed skater
- Tony Staskunas, lawyer, member of the Wisconsin State Assembly and of the Milwaukee County Board of Supervisors
- Rick Wagner, former NFL offensive tackle for the Baltimore Ravens, the Detroit Lions, and the Green Bay Packers
