= Southeast Conference (Wisconsin) =

Wisconsin high school athletic conference

The Southeast Conference (SEC) is a high school athletic conference consisting of large schools in southeastern Wisconsin. The conference and its member schools are affiliated with the Wisconsin Interscholastic Athletic Association.

== History ==
=== 1993-1997 ===
Location of Original Southeast Conference Members

The Southeast Conference was formed in 1993 as a fifteen-member superconference, taking all of its schools from three recently disbanded conferences. Five members came from the Big Nine (Kenosha Bradford, Kenosha Tremper, Racine Case, Racine Horlick and Racine Park), five from the Suburban Park (Kettle Moraine, Muskego, Nathan Hale, Oak Creek and West Allis Central) and four from the Braveland (Arrowhead, Mukwonago, Waukesha North and Waukesha South). The recently opened Waukesha West High School, which would have become Braveland Conference members but for its dissolution, rounded out the original membership roster of the Southeast Conference. Schools were subdivided by geography along previous conference alignments, and schedules were weighted to give more games to divisional opponents:

Central Division	South Division	West Division
Kettle Moraine	Kenosha Bradford	Arrowhead
Muskego	Kenosha Tremper	Mukwonago
Nathan Hale	Racine Case	Waukesha North
Oak Creek	Racine Horlick	Waukesha South
West Allis Central	Racine Park	Waukesha West

=== 1997-2009 ===
Location of Southeast Conference Members (1997-2009)

After a few years of competition, most of the schools in the Central and West Divisions were unhappy with the long travel distances experienced with facing schools in Racine and Kenosha. In addition, the WIAA approved a merger with the Wisconsin Independent Schools Athletic Association (an organization for private school athletics) to begin in 1997. In the wake of these developments, another round of realignment was approved for the high school conferences in southeastern Wisconsin. Two new conferences were created (Classic 8 and Greater Metro), and the Southeast Conference lost members to both of them. Six schools (Arrowhead, Kettle Moraine, Mukwonago, Waukesha North, Waukesha South and Waukesha West) joined the Classic 8, and two joined the Greater Metro (Nathan Hale and West Allis Central). The remaining seven schools accepted three new members into the Southeast Conference: two from the Woodland Conference (Franklin and South Milwaukee) and one from the Southern Lakes Conference (Burlington). The ten schools of the Southeast Conference were aligned into Northern and Southern divisions:

Northern Division	Southern Division
Burlington	Kenosha Bradford
Franklin	Kenosha Tremper
Muskego	Racine Case
Oak Creek	Racine Horlick
South Milwaukee	Racine Park

=== 2009-present ===
Within a few years after the Southeast Conference was realigned in 1997, the two smallest schools (Burlington and South Milwaukee) began to voice their displeasure at the long travel distances and competitive imbalance they faced as members. Both schools rejoined their former conferences in 2009, with Burlington returning to the Southern Lakes Conference and South Milwaukee reuniting with the Woodland Conference. The Southeast Conference dropped divisional alignments to compete as a single entity with the reduction to eight members. In 2012, Muskego left to join the Classic 8 Conference after the Kenosha Unified School District added a third high school on the west side of the city (Indian Trail High School and Academy). In 2025, Oak Creek left to become members of the Classic 8 Conference, decreasing the Southeast Conference's roster to seven schools. In April 2026, the WIAA Board of Controls made their conference realignments for the 2027-28 school year final, moving Franklin to the Greater Metro Conference and shaving the Southeast Conference down to the six schools in Racine and Kenosha.

=== Football-only alignment ===
In February 2019, in conjunction with the Wisconsin Football Coaches Association, the WIAA released a sweeping football-only realignment for Wisconsin to commence with the 2020 football season and run on a two-year cycle. The Southeast Conference was one of the few conferences in the state that stayed entirely intact after the realignment, and will be adding an eighth football member for the 2026-2027 realignment cycle. Rufus King International High School in Milwaukee will be leaving the Richardson Division of the Milwaukee City Conference to play in the Southeast Conference for at least the next two seasons.

== List of member schools ==
=== Current full members ===
School	Location	Affiliation	Enrollment	Mascot	Colors	Joined
Franklin (Note: Joining the Greater Metro Conference for the 2027-28 school year)	Franklin, WI	Public	1,547	Sabers		1997
Kenosha Bradford	Kenosha, WI	Public	1,710	Red Devils		1993
Kenosha Indian Trail	Kenosha, WI	Public	2,035	Hawks		2012
Kenosha Tremper	Kenosha, WI	Public	1,598	Trojans		1993
Racine Case	Racine, WI	Public	1,760	Eagles		1993
Racine Horlick	Racine, WI	Public	1,171	Rebels		1993
Racine Park	Racine, WI	Public	1,174	Panthers		1993

=== Current associate members ===
School	Location	Affiliation	Mascot	Colors	Primary Conference	Sport(s)
Oak Creek	Oak Creek, WI	Public	Knights		Classic 8	Football
Rufus King	Milwaukee, WI	Public	Generals		Milwaukee City	Football
The Prairie School	Wind Point, WI	Private (Nonsectarian)	Hawks		Metro Classic	Girls Golf

=== Current co-operative members ===
Team	Colors	Host School	Co-operative Members	Sport(s)
Kenosha Gymnastics		Kenosha Tremper	Kenosha Bradford, Kenosha Indian Trail, Westosha Central	Gymnastics
Racine Unified Titans		Racine Case	Racine Horlick, Racine Park	Boys Swim & Dive, Girls Swim & Dive

=== Former full members ===
School	Location	Affiliation	Mascot	Colors	Joined	Left	Conference Joined	Current Conference
Arrowhead	Hartland, WI	Public	Warhawks		1993	1997	Classic 8	
Burlington	Burlington, WI	Public	Demons		1997	2009	Southern Lakes	
Kettle Moraine	Wales, WI	Public	Lasers		1993	1997	Classic 8	
Mukwonago	Mukwonago, WI	Public	Indians		1993	1997	Classic 8	
Muskego	Muskego, WI	Public	Warriors		1993	2012	Classic 8	
Nathan Hale	West Allis, WI	Public	Huskies		1993	1997	Greater Metro	
Oak Creek	Oak Creek, WI	Public	Knights		1993	2025	Classic 8	
South Milwaukee	South Milwaukee, WI	Public	Rockets		1997	2009	Woodland	
Waukesha North	Waukesha, WI	Public	Northstars		1993	1997	Classic 8	Woodland
Waukesha South	Waukesha, WI	Public	Blackshirts		1993	1997	Classic 8	Woodland
Waukesha West	Waukesha, WI	Public	Wolverines		1993	1997	Classic 8	
West Allis Central	West Allis, WI	Public	Bulldogs		1993	1997	Greater Metro	Woodland

== Membership timeline ==
=== Full members ===
Central Division South Division West Division Northern Division Southern Division

=== Football members ===
Central Division South Division West Division Northern Division Southern Division

== Membership map ==
Southeast Conference
Location of Southeast Conference full members:
1 Franklin
2 Kenosha Bradford
3 Kenosha Indian Trail
4 Kenosha Tremper
5 Racine Case
6 Racine Horlick
7 Racine Park

== Sponsored sports ==
	Baseball	Boys Basketball	Girls Basketball	Boys Cross Country	Girls Cross Country	Football	Boys Golf	Girls Golf	Gymnastics (Note: Co-sponsored with the Classic 8 Conference)	Boys Soccer	Girls Soccer	Softball	Boys Swim & Dive	Girls Swim & Dive	Boys Tennis	Girls Tennis	Boys Track & Field	Girls Track & Field	Boys Volleyball	Girls Volleyball	Boys Wrestling	Girls Wrestling
Franklin	●	●	●	●	●		●	●	● (Note: Co-operative with Muskego)	●	●	●	●	●	●	●	●	●	●	●	●	●
Kenosha Bradford	● (Note: Co-operative with Reuther Central)	●	●	●	●	●	●	●		●	●	●	●	●	●	●	●	●	●	●	●	●
Kenosha Indian Trail	●	●	●	●	●	●	●	●		●	●	●	●	●	●	●	●	●	●	●	●	●
Kenosha Tremper	●	●	●	●	●	●	●	●	● (Note: Kenosha Gymnastics co-operative)	●	●	●	●	●	●	●	●	●	●	●	●	●
Racine Case	●	●	●	●	●	●	●	●		●	●	●	● (Note: Racine Unified Titans co-operative)	●	●	●	●	●	●	●	●	●
Racine Horlick	●	●	●	●		●				●	●	● (Note: Co-operative with Racine Park)			●	●	●	●	●	●	●	●
Racine Park	●	●	●	●	● (Note: Co-operative with Racine Horlick)	●	●	●		●	●						●	●		●		

== List of state champions ==
=== Fall sports ===
Boys Cross Country
School	Year	Division
Arrowhead	1995	Division 1
Arrowhead	1996	Division 1

Girls Cross Country
School	Year	Division
Waukesha West	1993	Division 1
Mukwonago	1994	Division 1

Football
School	Year	Division
Arrowhead	1993	Division 1
Arrowhead	1994	Division 1
Arrowhead	1996	Division 1
Racine Park	2005	Division 1
Kenosha Bradford	2011	Division 1

Girls Golf
School	Year	Division
Racine Horlick	1994	Single Division
Racine Case	1997	Single Division
Kenosha Bradford	2005	Division 1

Boys Volleyball
School	Year	Division
Racine Horlick	2003	Single Division

Girls Volleyball
School	Year	Division
Nathan Hale	1996	Division 1
Kenosha Tremper	2008	Division 1

=== Winter sports ===
Boys Basketball
School	Year	Division
Racine Case	1999	Division 1

Girls Basketball
School	Year	Division
Racine Park	1997	Division 1
Oak Creek	2014	Division 1

Boys Swimming & Diving
School	Year	Division
Arrowhead	1995	Division 1
Arrowhead	1997	Division 1

Boys Wrestling
School	Year	Division
Muskego	1994	Division 1

=== Spring sports ===
Baseball
School	Year	Division
Kenosha Bradford	2008	Division 1

Softball
School	Year	Division
Kenosha Bradford	2024	Division 1

Boys Track & Field
School	Year	Division
Racine Park	1997	Division 1
Racine Park	1998	Division 1
Racine Park	2000	Division 1

Girls Track & Field
School	Year	Division
Kenosha Tremper	2013	Division 1
Kenosha Tremper	2014	Division 1

=== Summer sports ===
Baseball
School	Year	Division
Oak Creek	2003	Single Division
Oak Creek	2004	Single Division
Oak Creek	2005	Single Division
Oak Creek	2012	Single Division

== List of conference champions ==
=== Boys Basketball ===
School	Quantity	Years
Racine Case	12	1994, 1998, 1999, 2000, 2005, 2011, 2013, 2014, 2020, 2022, 2024, 2026
Oak Creek	8	1994, 1996, 1999, 2000, 2004, 2006, 2008, 2017
Franklin	7	1999, 2001, 2003, 2005, 2018, 2022, 2023
Racine Horlick	7	1996, 1997, 2001, 2002, 2003, 2006, 2009
Racine Park	7	1998, 2007, 2010, 2012, 2016, 2019, 2025
Muskego	4	1998, 2003, 2005, 2007
Kenosha Tremper	3	1995, 2004, 2008
Waukesha West	3	1995, 1996, 1997
Nathan Hale	2	1995, 1997
Waukesha South	2	1994, 1997
Burlington	1	2009
Kenosha Indian Trail	1	2015
Mukwonago	1	1996
South Milwaukee	1	2001
Arrowhead	0	
Kenosha Bradford	0	
Kettle Moraine	0	
Waukesha North	0	
West Allis Central	0	

=== Girls Basketball ===
School	Quantity	Years
Oak Creek	14	2004, 2005, 2007, 2008, 2013, 2014, 2015, 2016, 2017, 2018, 2019, 2020, 2022, 2025
Franklin	10	1998, 1999, 2000, 2002, 2003, 2005, 2006, 2023, 2024, 2026
Racine Park	7	1994, 1995, 1996, 1997, 1998, 1999, 2001
Racine Case	5	2007, 2009, 2010, 2011, 2012
Kenosha Tremper	4	2002, 2005, 2006, 2008
Muskego	4	2001, 2004, 2009, 2010
Kenosha Bradford	3	2000, 2005, 2025
Nathan Hale	3	1995, 1996, 1997
Mukwonago	2	1994, 1997
Racine Horlick	2	2003, 2004
Arrowhead	1	1996
Waukesha South	1	1995
West Allis Central	1	1994
Burlington	0	
Kenosha Indian Trail	0	
Kettle Moraine	0	
South Milwaukee	0	
Waukesha North	0	
Waukesha West	0	

=== Football ===
School	Quantity	Years
Franklin	16	1999, 2004, 2006, 2010, 2013, 2014, 2015, 2016, 2018, 2019, 2020, 2021, 2022, 2023, 2024, 2025
Oak Creek	10	1997, 1998, 1999, 2000, 2002, 2003, 2005, 2012, 2014, 2022
Kenosha Tremper	7	1993, 1994, 1995, 2000, 2001, 2004, 2007
Racine Park	5	1996, 1997, 1998, 2005, 2008
Arrowhead	3	1993, 1994, 1996
Racine Horlick	3	1999, 2008, 2017
Kenosha Bradford	2	2009, 2011
Kettle Moraine	2	1993, 1996
Mukwonago	2	1993, 1995
Muskego	2	1994, 1995
Racine Case	1	2026
Burlington	0	
Kenosha Indian Trail	0	
Nathan Hale	0	
Rufus King	0	
South Milwaukee	0	
Waukesha North	0	
Waukesha South	0	
Waukesha West	0	
West Allis Central	0	
