= Greendale High School =

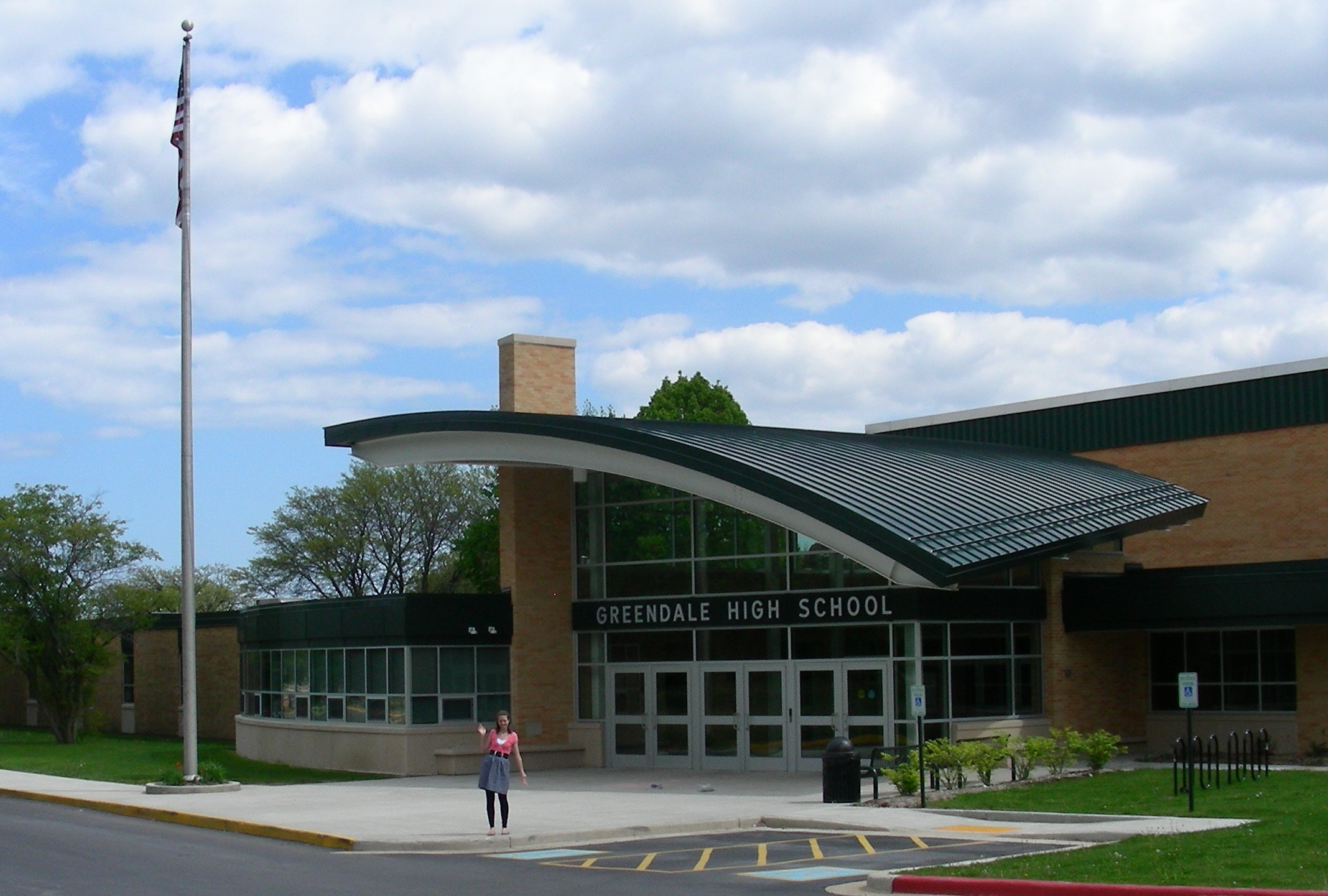

Location
- 6801 Southway; Greendale, Wisconsin 53129; United States; 42°56′4″N 87°59′56″W

Information
- Type: Public secondary
- Established: 1949
- School district: Greendale School District
- Principal: Steve Lodes
- Teaching staff: 60.37 (on an FTE basis)
- Grades: 9–12
- Enrollment: 909 (2023-2024)
- Student to teacher ratio: 15.06
- Colors: Kelly green and white
- Nickname: Panthers
- Yearbook: Pioneer
- Website: www.greendaleschools.org/o/ghs

Greendale High School is a four-year public high school in Greendale, Wisconsin, a suburb of Milwaukee. Part of the Greendale School District, it serves students in grades 9 through 12.

== Extracurricular activities ==
The Greendale High School marching band has been the Class AA State Champion for 22 total years and 21 consecutive years (2005 to 2026) and was selected to participate in the 2016 and 2023 Macy's Thanksgiving Day Parades in New York City as well as the 2020 and 2026 Tournament of Roses Parades in Pasadena, CA and the London New Years Day Parade in 2027. The band is directed by Tom and Liz Reifenberg, with colorguard director Tammy Reifenberg, and percussion directors Aaron and Dave Muencheberg.

=== Athletic conference affiliation history ===
- Suburban Conference (1952-1961)
- Braveland Conference (1961-1963)
- Parkland Conference (1963-1985)
- Suburban Park Conference (1985-1993)
- Woodland Conference (1993–present)

== Notable alumni ==
- Joan Fitzgerald – Wisconsin state legislator
- Jim Gruenwald – Greco-Roman wrestler, former US Olympic team member
- Dave Smith – AFL player
- Jane Kaczmarek – Actress
- Stephen D. Burrows – Comedic storyteller, writer, director, actor
- Mark Massa – Indiana State Supreme Court Justice
- Luke Eisner – Actor and singer
