= Shorewood High School (Wisconsin) =

Coordinates: 43°5′17.3″N 87°53′19.8″W

Location
- 1701 E. Capitol Drive; Shorewood, WI 53211; United States

Information
- Type: Public high school
- Motto: A Tradition Of Excellence
- Established: 1925; 101 years ago
- Principal: Tim Kenney
- Faculty: 43.77 (on FTE basis)
- Enrollment: 619 (2023-2024)
- Student to teacher ratio: 14.14
- Colors: Red and grey
- Athletics conference: Woodland Conference
- Team name: Greyhound
- Rival: Whitefish Bay High School
- Website: School website

Shorewood High School is a comprehensive public high school located in the village of Shorewood, Wisconsin. It is part of the Shorewood School District.

As of the 2022–23 school year, the school had an enrollment of 636 students and 48.47 classroom teachers on a full-time equivalent basis, giving a student to teacher ratio of 13.12. The school's original colors were blue and gold but were changed to red and grey in 1930. Among options for extra curricular activities for students are 23 sports and more than 40 co-curricular clubs and activities. The school also publishes a student newspaper called Ripples.

== Facilities ==
=== Administration Building ===
The original building on the campus is the administration building. Constructed in 1925, it features a 40-foot diameter copper dome used as a social studies classroom. The administration building houses administration, the health office, social studies, English, and foreign language classes. The administration building underwent a major renovation and addition that began in June 2020 and was completed around July 2023 as part of a $65 million district-wide referendum approved by voters in April 2019.

=== Auditorium ===
The campus features a 1,211 seat auditorium that resembles the RKO Theater, now known as Radio City Music Hall. The auditorium was renamed the Barb Gensler Theater for The Dramatic Arts in 2012 in honor of retired drama department director Barbara Gensler and her 47 years of service to the school.

=== Fitness Center ===
In 1998 the Manual Arts Building which housed woods, metals and drafting classes, was renovated and now houses the Community Fitness Center.

=== John F. Nickoll Stadium ===
John F. Nickoll Stadium in Shorewood is the home to the Shorewood High School football, boys and girls soccer, and, boys and girls lacrosse teams. It also had two stints as a home venue for the Milwaukee Panthers football team of the University of Wisconsin–Milwaukee from 1956–67 and again in 1972. The stadium has also occasionally served as a home for Milwaukee's club (non-NCAA sanctioned) football team since 2003.

Preceded by Pearse Field	Home of Milwaukee Panthers football 1956-1967	Succeeded by Milwaukee County Stadium
Preceded by Milwaukee County Stadium	Home of Milwaukee Panthers football 1972	Succeeded by Marquette Stadium

=== Swimming Pools ===
The district operates two swimming pools: the VHE pool, located adjacent to the Science/Math building, and the SHS pool, located in the Physical Education Building.

== Extra-curricular activities ==
=== Performing arts ===
The Shorewood Drama Department produces a minimum of three shows annually. It was the first high school in its area to perform the musical "A Chorus Line" in 1986, and the first in the nation to perform "Rent" (the high school edition) in 2006. In 2006, they also performed "Urinetown the Musical". The high school has been mentioned in The New York Times, along with three other schools, for its outstanding theater and its ability to "spend more money on a drama production than on their director's annual salary." In May 2013, they performed "Spring Awakening", sparking both criticism and praise from community members. The show was performed unedited from the original Broadway production, and students were required to turn in a signed parent permission slip to audition for the musical.

== Notable alumni ==
- Jim Abrahams, filmmaker
- Les Aspin, Congressman and United States Secretary of Defense
- Kate Baldwin, Broadway actress, nominated for Best Actress in a Musical for her performance in Finian's Rainbow
- Dickey Chapelle (born Georgette Louise Meyer), photojournalist.
- John Fiedler, actor, voice of Piglet
- Lewis Friedman, screenwriter
- Paul C. Gartzke, Presiding Judge of the Wisconsin Court of Appeals
- Jerry Harrison (Jeremiah Griffin Harrison), member of Talking Heads
- Walter Heller, economist and Chairman of the Council of Economic Advisers during the Kennedy and Johnson administrations
- Kirby Hendee, Wisconsin State Senator
- Bonnie Ladwig, Wisconsin politician
- Stephen R. Leopold, Wisconsin State Representative
- Marcus Monroe, actor, juggler, and TV personality
- Lloyd Pettit, Emmy-award-winning sports broadcaster.
- Charlotte Rae, actress (Mrs. Garrett on The Facts of Life)
- William Rehnquist, Chief Justice of the United States Supreme Court
- John Rinka, college basketball player at Kenyon College who is among the NCAA top ten all-time scorers (3,251 points)
- Ben L. Salomon, Medal of Honor recipient
- John Searle, analytic philosopher
- Ben Seidman, sleight-of-hand performer, actor, comedian, and creative consultant
- Robert J. Shaw, screenwriter
- Leif Shiras, professional tennis player
- Andrew Tallon (1969 – 2018), art historian
- Martin Vogt (Haywyre) Musician, music producer, composer, and DJ.
- Thomas Vonier, architect, president of International Union of Architects
- Joan Walsh, national affairs correspondent, The Nation magazine
- Doris Gnauck White, science educator
- David Zucker, movie director.
- Jerry Zucker, movie director
