= Slinger High School =

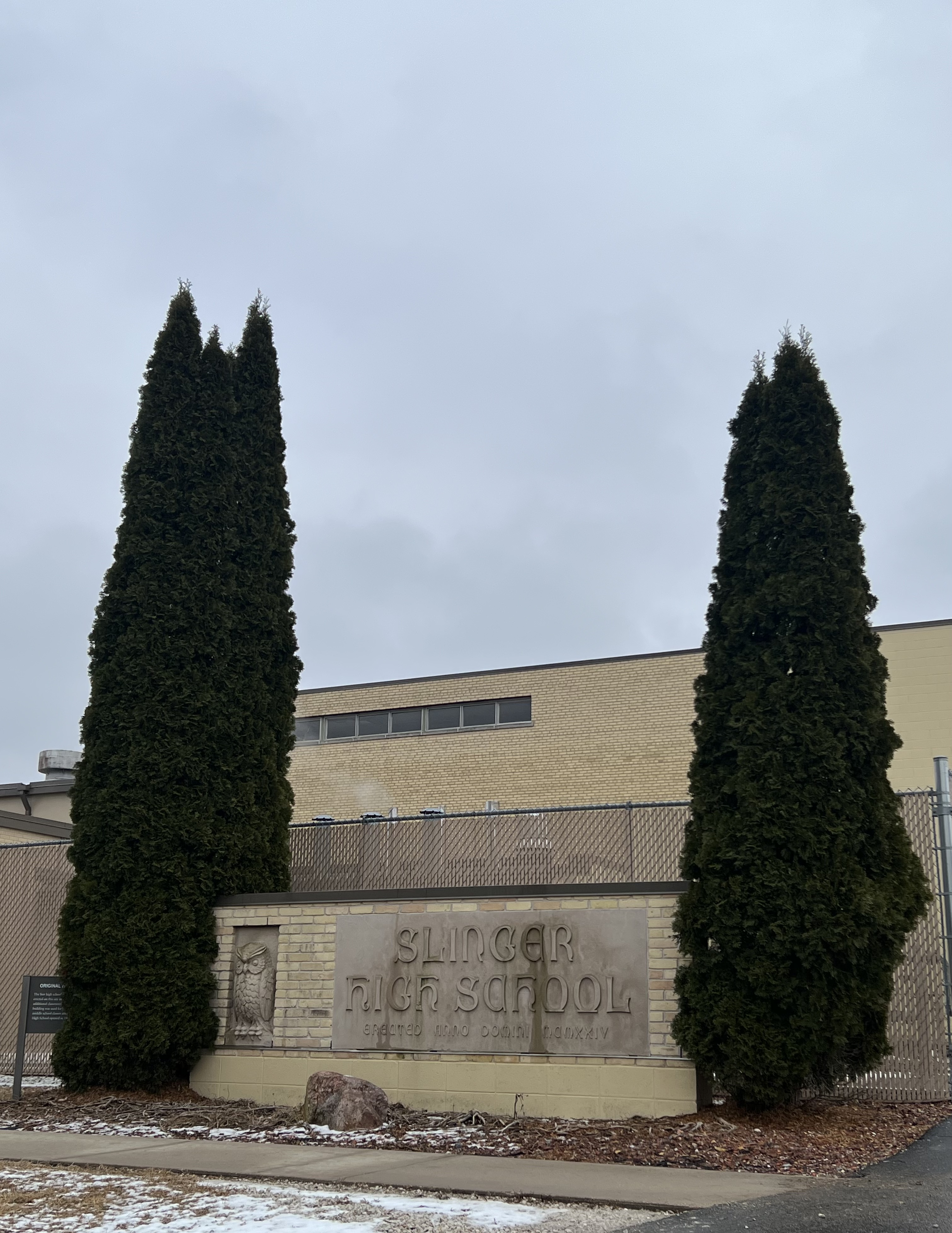

Location
- 209 Polk Street; Slinger, Wisconsin 53086; United States; 43°19′51″N 88°17′5″W

Information
- Type: Public high school
- Established: 1914; 112 years ago
- School district: Slinger School District
- Superintendent: Kristi Brooks
- Principal: Philip Ourada
- Teaching staff: 63.99 (FTE)
- Grades: 9–12
- Enrollment: 1,044 (2023–2024)
- Student to teacher ratio: 16.32
- Colours: Scarlet, white and Royal blue
- Song: Onward Victorious
- Fight song: Slinger Fite Song
- Athletics conference: North Shore Conference
- Mascot: Hootie the Owl
- Team name: Owls
- Newspaper: Nite Crier
- Website: slinger.k12.wi.us/schools/high

Slinger High School is a public secondary educational institution in Slinger, Wisconsin, United States.

== Overview ==
Founded in 1914, the school operates within the Slinger School District, providing education to students from the communities of Slinger, Allenton, Addison, and St. Lawrence.

In 2016, the Slinger School District community passed a referendum to fund the renovation of its gymnasium and the construction of a new auditorium. The facilities expansion project was completed in 2018.

The campus includes athletic facilities featuring a football field and press box. In July 2024, the press box was damaged due to vandalism, leading to felony charges against one individual. > In October 2024, the school enacted safety protocols in response to a threat communicated through social media. The incident resulted in a student's dismissal and subsequent legal action against a teenager for disorderly conduct.

== History Culture project ==
In 2000, Slinger High School started integrating local history into its social studies curriculum. Subsequently, the school operated the Slinger Area History Culture Project beginning in 2013, allowing students to utilize primary sources, interviews, and field studies to analyze local history and culture, sharing their findings with the public, including during Slinger's 150th anniversary in 2019.

== Athletics ==
Athletic programs at the school operate under the name "Slinger Owls". The school participates in interscholastic competition through the Wisconsin Interscholastic Athletic Association (WIAA), offering programs in football, basketball, soccer, track and field, baseball, softball, tennis, volleyball, golf, cross-country, and wrestling. The football program competes in WIAA Division 2. In the 2024 season, the football team advanced to the Division 2 Level 3 playoff game and received recognition, as WisSports.net Statewide Team of the Week in October 2024.

=== Conference affiliation history ===
- Fox Valley Tri-County League (1924-1935)
- 4-C Conference (1935-1953)
- Southeastern Wisconsin Conference (1953-1958)
- Scenic Moraine Conference (1958-1980)
- Parkland Conference (1980-2006)
- Wisconsin Little Ten Conference (2006-2017)
- North Shore Conference (2017–present)

== Performing Arts ==
The school's marching band program has participated in several national and international events. These performances include the 2001 United States Presidential Inauguration Parade, the 2009 London New Year's Day Parade, and the 2019 Hawaii Thanksgiving Day Parade.

== Notable alumni ==
- Paul Spaeth – American musician
- Josh Bilicki – Stock car racing driver
- Ethan Schulteis – YouTube content creator
