= Andrew Lee =

Andrew Lee may refer to:

- Andrew Lee (Australian footballer) (born 1986), player in the Australian Football League
- Andrew E. Lee (1847–1934), third Governor of South Dakota
- Andrew Daulton Lee (born 1952), American drug dealer and espionage agent
- W. P. Andrew Lee (born c. 1957), Taiwanese-American surgeon
- Louis Auchincloss (1917–2010), American novelist and lawyer, who wrote as Andrew Lee
- Andrew Lee (entrepreneur) (born 1983), Korean-American claimant to the Korean Empire
- Andrew Lee (magician) (born 1986), Malaysian magician
- R. Andrew Lee (born 1982), American pianist

== See also ==
- Andy Lee (disambiguation)
- Andrew Li (born 1948), former Chief Justice of the Court of Final Appeal of Hong Kong
- Andrew Leigh (born 1972), Australian politician and economist
- Andrew Lees (disambiguation)
