= Brooks Stevens =

American industrial designer (1911–1995)

- Born: 7 June 1911; Milwaukee
- Died: 4 January 1995 (aged 83); Milwaukee

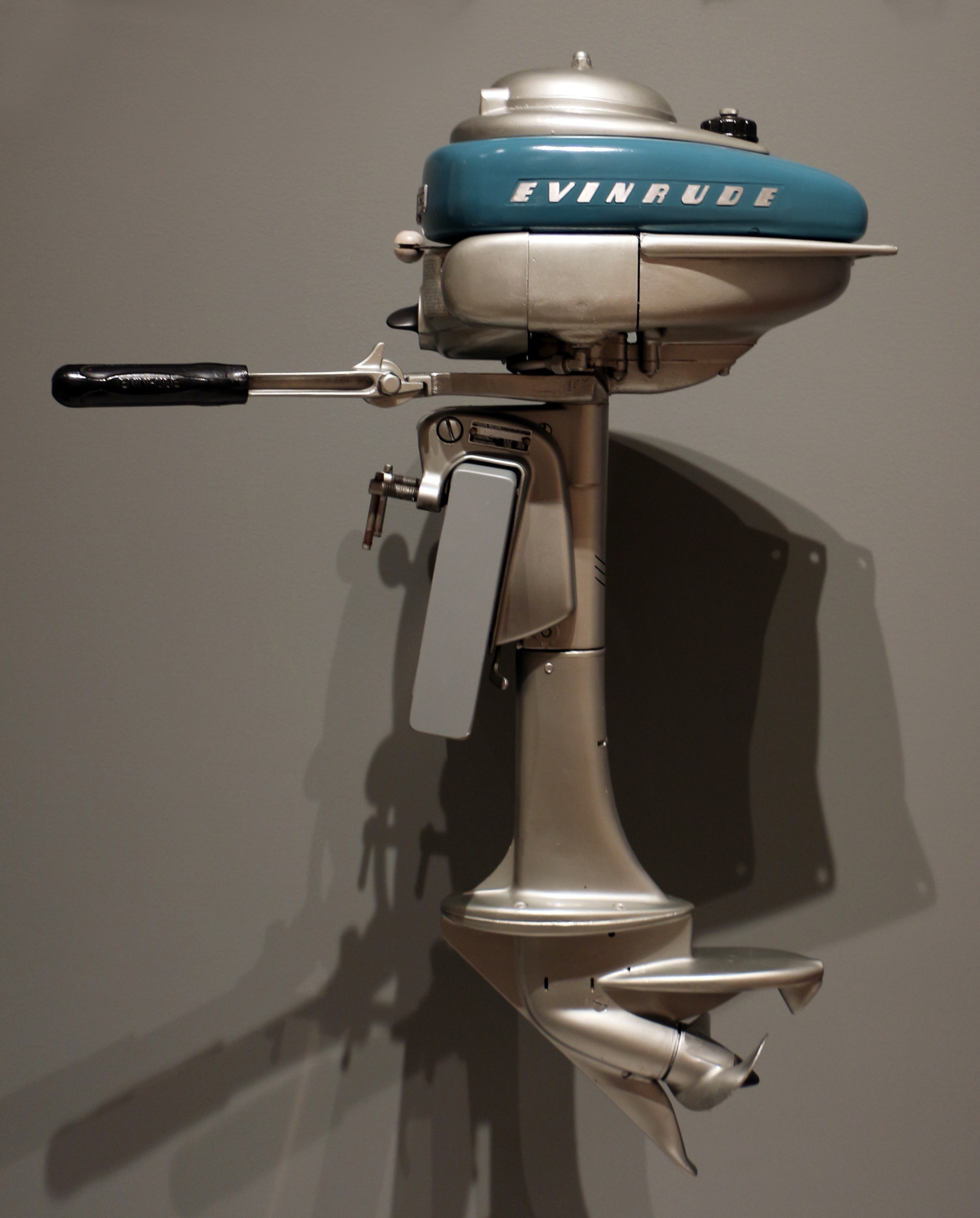
Evinrude Sportwin outboard motor (1947)

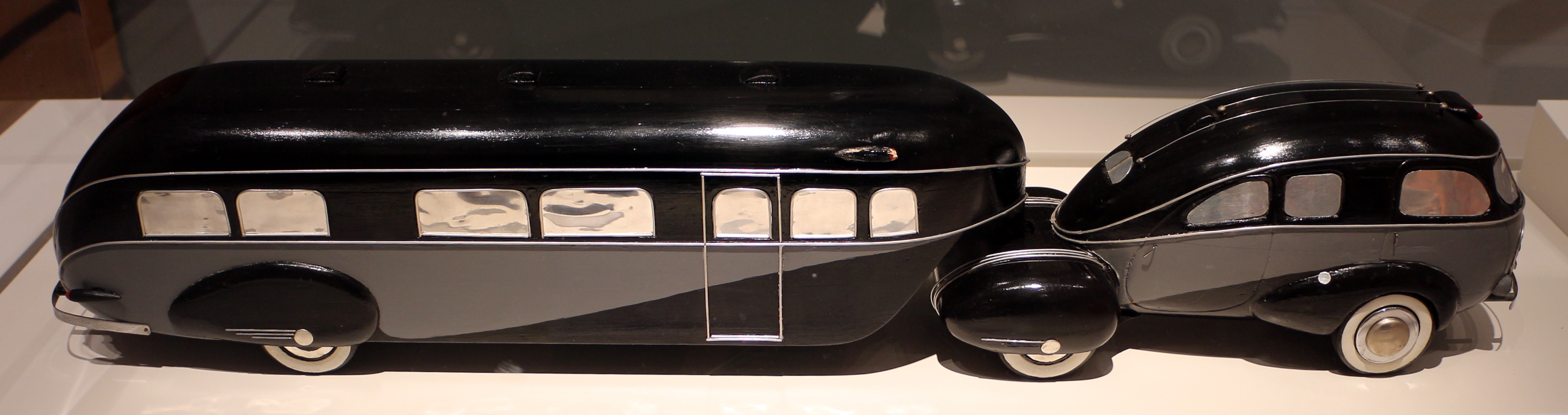
Zephyr land yacht concept model (1936)

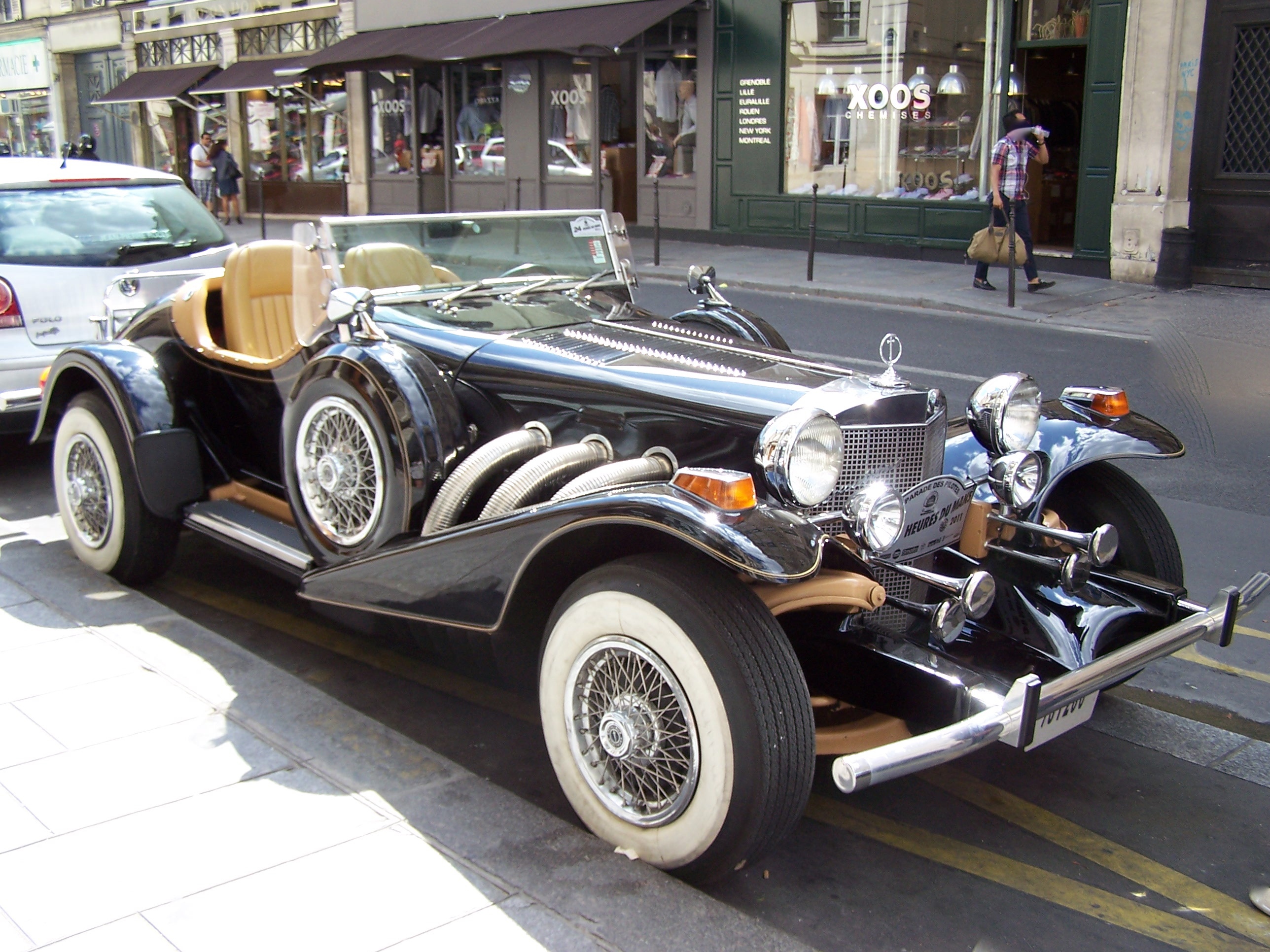
1970s Excalibur SS

Clifford Brooks Stevens (June 7, 1911 – January 4, 1995) was an American industrial designer of home furnishings, appliances, automobiles, passenger railroad cars, and motorcycles, as well as a graphic designer and stylist. Stevens founded Brooks Stevens, Inc., headquartered in Allenton, Wisconsin.

In 1944, along with Raymond Loewy and eight others, Stevens formed the Industrial Designers Society of America. Upon his death in 1995, The New York Times called Stevens "a major force in industrial design".

== Background and personal life ==
Stevens was born in Milwaukee, Wisconsin, on June 7, 1911. Stricken with polio as a child, he was encouraged by his father to practice drawing while confined to his bed, perhaps motivating his career in design. He studied architecture at Cornell University from 1929 to 1933, and established his own home-furnishings design firm in 1934 in Milwaukee. His son, Kipp Stevens, ran the Brooks Stevens Design Associates until late 2008, when he stepped down.

In 1959, Stevens opened a 12,500sf automotive museum in Mequon, Wisconsin, which became a repository for his own designs as well as others—and became a production facility in the late 1980s for the Wienermobile fleet. The museum closed in 1999, four years after his death.

Stevens died on January 4, 1995, in Milwaukee. He was survived by his wife Alice, children and grandchildren.

== Design ==
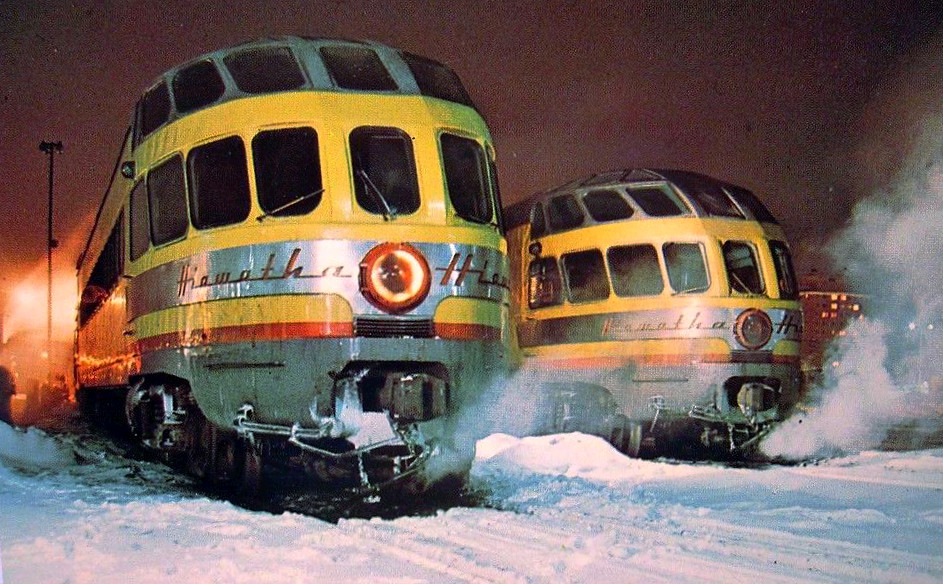
Skytop Lounge cars of the Chicago, Milwaukee, St. Paul & Pacific Railroad, displaying their distinctive glassed-in observation areas (c. 1948–1955)

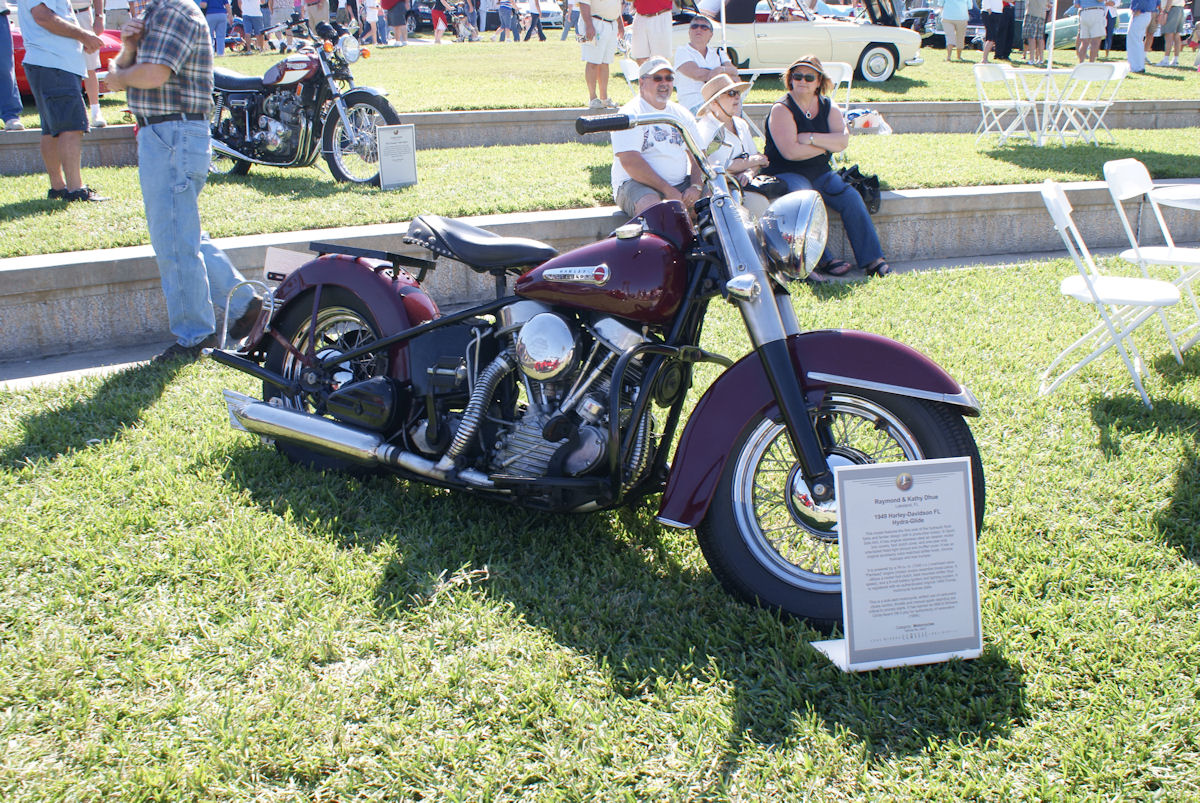
1949 Harley Davidson FL Hydra-Glide

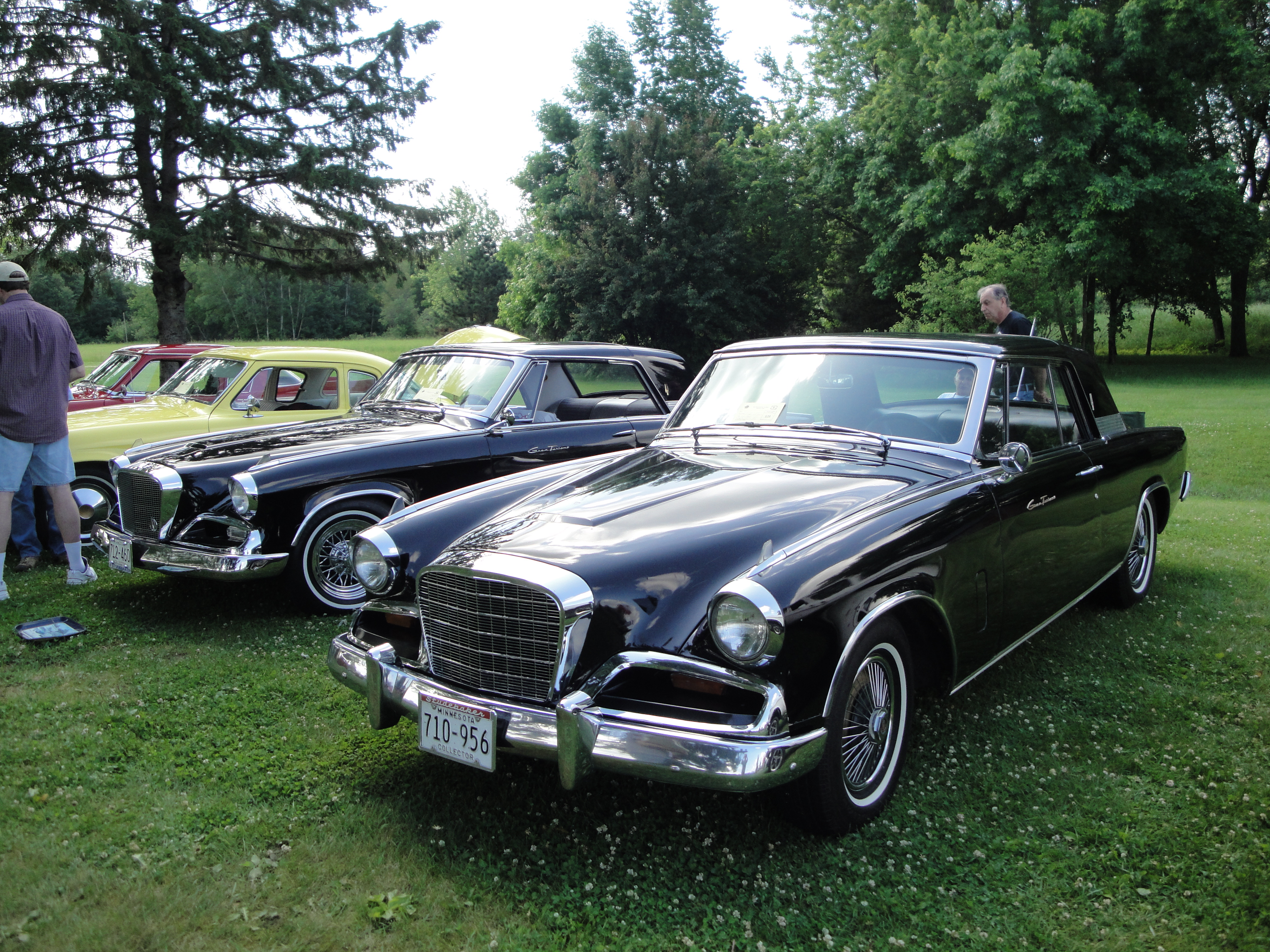
1962 Studebaker Hawk Gran Turismo

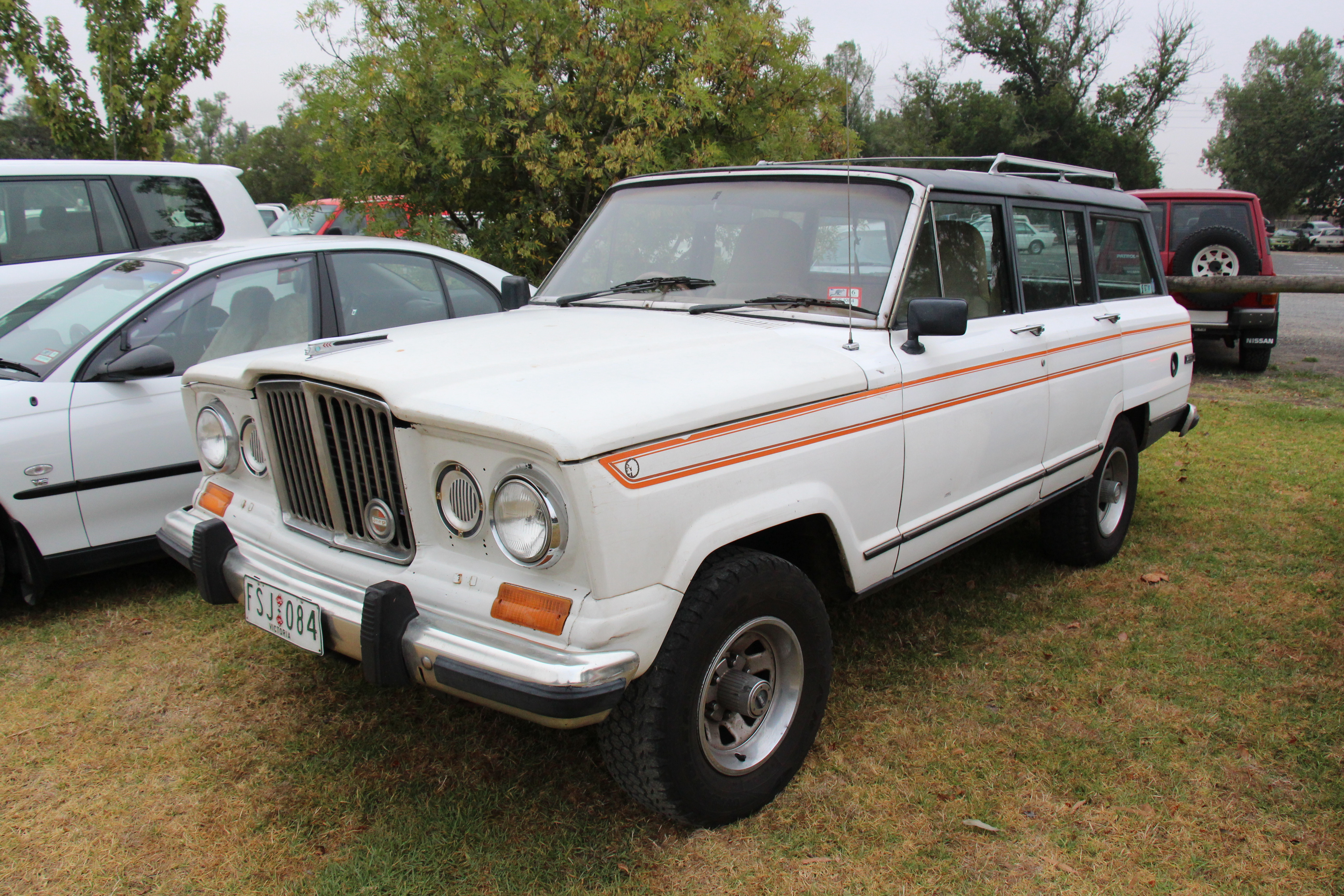
1964 Jeep Wagoneer (with aftermarket mag style wheels)

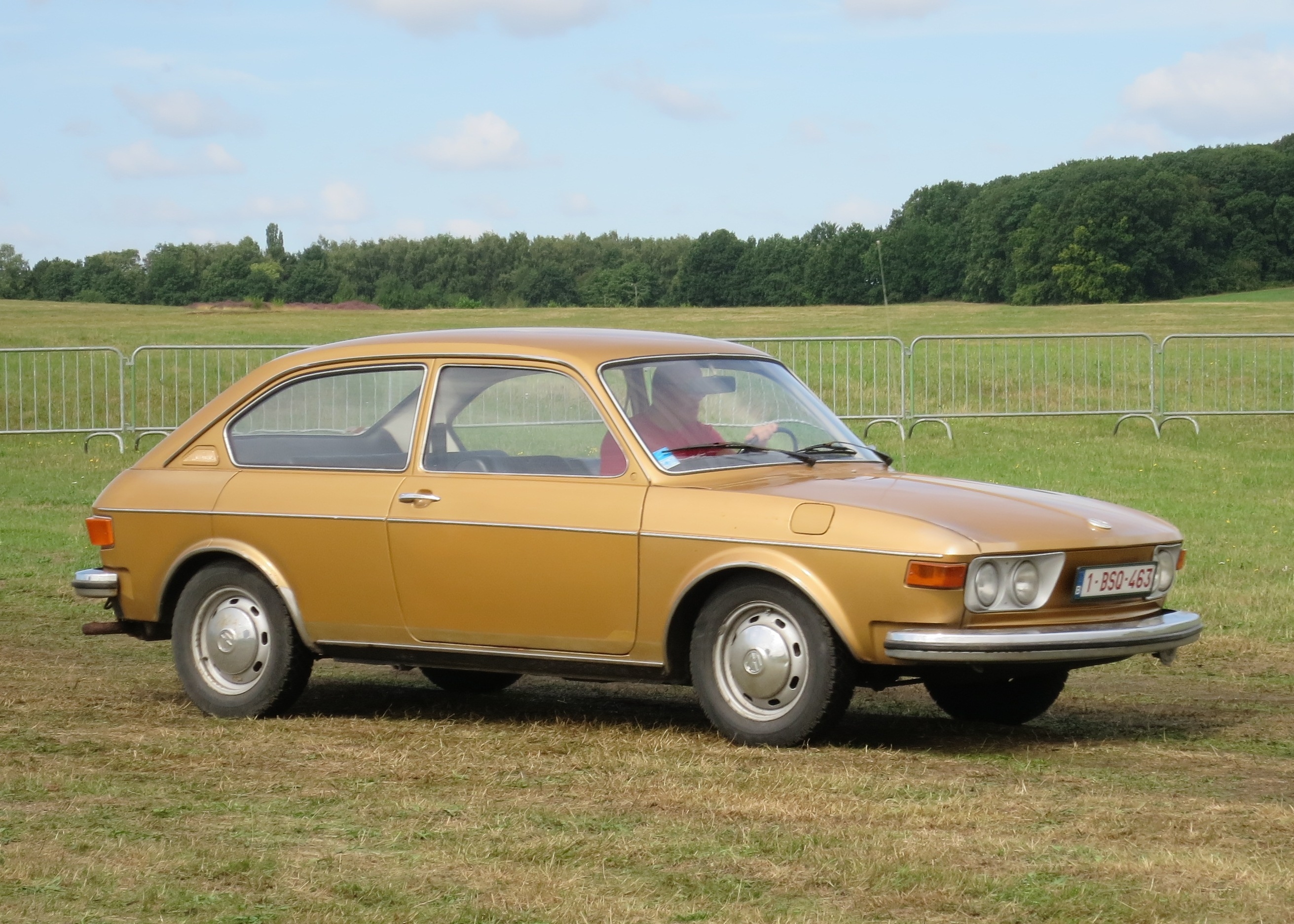
1972–1974 Volkswagen 412

Stevens is credited with styling the late 1940s Modern Hygiene canister vacuum cleaners, and designed Harley-Davidson motorcycles including the 1949 Hydra-Glide Harley, one of his first, helping create the new suspension forks in the front, bucket headlight, and the streamlined design. All Harleys since, including models in production now, are based on Stevens's body designs.

His designs in home and kitchen appliances were popular, and he is recognized as the originator of the robin's-egg-blue phase of 1950s kitchen appliances, as well as the iconic Skylark laminate design popularized by Formica. He also practiced architectural design and graphic design. Of note is his design of the Miller Brewing logo and he is also credited with convincing the company to switch from traditional brown bottles to clear bottles.

As an automobile designer round about 1954 Stevens shaped the Die Valkyrie based on the Cadillac Eldorado of the same year. The car had a V-shaped bumper. He redesigned the 1962 Studebaker Gran Turismo Hawk on a minuscule budget. The fast, elegant GT remained until the end of American production. According to Hendry, Stevens also styled "three innovative products for family car use for the 1964–1966 period" (which were never manufactured).

He designed the Jeep Wagoneer, which was introduced for 1963 by Willys-Jeep. This model was so popular that it was offered in basically the same form by Jeep's subsequent owners, including Kaiser Jeep, AMC, and finally Chrysler, until 1991.

Stevens updated the design of the Oscar Mayer Wienermobile, an American pop-culture icon, using modern fiberglass methods to "put the wiener in the bun" in 1958. He designed engines for Briggs & Stratton. He also designed the university logo for the Milwaukee School of Engineering (MSOE) in 1978 as a part of "The Diamond Jubilee" celebration. The logo remains in use today.

Stevens designed the post-war Skytop Lounge observation cars for the Chicago, Milwaukee, St. Paul & Pacific Railroad's Hiawatha passenger trains.

He also designed a series of Excalibur sport cars for Studebaker. Originally intended as a halo car for Studebaker. Studebaker opted out of the program in December 1963 after shuttering US car production. Stevens continued development of the Excalibur and would introduce the car at the New York Auto show in April 1964. In the mid-1960s he and his sons began production of the retro-styled Excalibur, modeled on the 1920s-era Mercedes-Benz SSK roadsters.

Stevens modernized the Aero-Willys sedans that were offered in Brazil in the 1960s, and there is a very Studebaker Hawk-ish look to the body of these cars.

Stevens's design contributions to the recreational boating industry included collaborations with Outboard Marine Corp. to style the Evinrude Lark and Johnson Javelin outboard motor series. He also designed the Evinrude Lark concept boat, eventually produced as the Cadillac Sea Lark. Together with Bob Hammond's 1956 Lone Star Meteor, these designs may be credited with introducing post-world war automotive styling to leisure craft. Other work in the marine industry include designs for Owens Yacht Company and Cutter Boats as well as a line of stainless steel marine hardware for the Vollrath Company.

Stevens is credited with restyling the front end of the Volkswagen 411, marketed as the 412.

== Planned obsolescence ==
Though he is often cited with inventing the concept of planned obsolescence (the practice of artificially shortening product lifecycle to influence the buying patterns of consumers in favor of manufacturers), he did not invent it but rather popularized the term. Stevens defined it as "instilling in the buyer the desire to own something a little newer, a little better, a little sooner than is necessary". His view was to always make the consumer want something new, rather than create poor products that would need replacing. There is some debate over his role in this controversial business practice.

== See also ==
- Automotive design
- Industrial design
- Product design
- Paxton Phoenix
