= Alfred G. Becker =

American politician from Wisconsin (1887–1956)

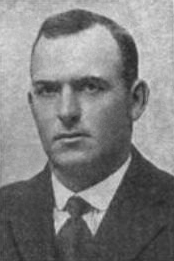

Member of the Wisconsin State Assembly
- In office 1919, 1921, 1923

Personal details
- Born: August 24, 1887 La Crosse, Wisconsin, US
- Died: February 27, 1956 (aged 68) Hartford, Wisconsin, US
- Party: Republican
- Occupation: Businessman, politician

Alfred George Becker (1887–1956) was an American politician. He was a member of the Wisconsin State Assembly.

== Biography ==
Becker was born on August 24, 1887, in Addison, Wisconsin, the son of Philip Becker (1862–1939) and Amalia née Ferber (1866–1951). He attended high school in Hartford, Wisconsin. Later, he resided in Allenton, Wisconsin.

He married Marie Ritger on January 6, 1940.

He died in Hartford on February 27, 1956.

== Career ==
Becker was a member of the Assembly during the 1919, 1921 and 1923 sessions. Additionally, Becker was a town chairman. He was a Republican.
