= Paul Spaeth =

American musician

Paul Spaeth is an independent musician and composer from the United States. He attended Slinger High School in Slinger, Wisconsin. He started his career at 15 after winning the Pepsi-Summerfest Talent Search contest. While in high school, his CD "Cobalt Blue" reached over 1.6 million downloads at MP3.com and he was recognized as the Top Artist in Los Angeles. Since then, his career has been varied with music for piano, television, film, and video games. He has personally called his music "Cinematic Piano" or "Visual Progressive Instrumental," to describe his highly melodic and textural styles, but his piano music is often categorized as New Age.

== Biography ==
=== Early life and education ===
Spaeth grew up in a family where no member was a musician nor an artist. When was three years old, his father took him to a Toys-R-Us and told him he could pick any toy in the store. He chose a yellow dinosaur-shaped toy piano, which planted the seed for his father to place him in piano lessons. In a move that would later enhance his composer's ear, his father placed him in Suzuki piano lessons, a method known for teaching children to play an instrument by listening to recordings as opposed to simply written music, when he was five. Spaeth later said he was so eager to get started after his first lesson that he listened to the lesson tapes repeatedly, late into the night. The next morning, his father woke up to the sound of music playing in the other room and found a young Paul sitting down, already playing the music he had listened to the night before.

As he continued lessons, his ability to improvise grew. When he was nine, Spaeth's grandfather discovered him improvising new compositions on the piano and decided to record them, telling him that he would be on the radio someday. Spaeth has attributed that experience to beginning his desire to become a recording artist. From age 13 through 17, he won several state-wide composition competitions by the Wisconsin School Music Association and Department of Public Instruction, including winning both first and second place awards for two of his pieces in the same year. At age 15, he attended a college-level jazz composition course in Shell Lake, Wisconsin with the late jazz arranger Frank Mantooth, who encouraged him to attend the University of Southern California to study film music.

At age 17, he attended the National High School Music Institute at Northwestern University. The five-week course of university-level training in music and composition allowed Spaeth the opportunity to work with a full orchestra of his peers from around the world. Utilizing this opportunity, he wrote his first piece for full orchestra and piano, "Tragoedia," a one-movement piano concerto that he performed along with the NHSMI orchestra as the finale in the last concert of the program. At age 18, he entered the composition and film scoring programs at the University of Southern California. During this time, he won numerous awards based on his work, including the 2003 Recording Academy's Grammy Scholarship Award, the Frank Wildhorn Composition Award, the Harry Warren Film Scoring Award, and First Prize in USC's Symposium for the Arts.

=== Career beginnings ===
Between the years 1997–2001, when he was in high school, Spaeth created New Age piano and orchestral pieces that would later become his first self-produced album, Cobalt Blue. He posted the tracks on the independent music website MP3.com and ultimately received 1.6 million downloads and accolades such as the Top Artist in Los Angeles. When he was 15, he won the Pepsi-Summerfest Talent Search at age 15 as a solo pianist competing against rock, rap, and jazz groups. Before he attended the University of Southern California for film music, he attracted the attention of Lawrence David Foldes, the youngest director to ever be on the board of the Academy of Motion Pictures Arts and Sciences. He solicited Spaeth to be the "hands" of an actor playing piano on screen, and arrange music for his film Finding Home. This was Spaeth's first appearance in film.

After graduating from the Thornton School of Music, Spaeth concentrated on his scoring career and worked for film composer Christopher Young, doing score preparation and additional orchestrations on films such as Lucky You and Ghost Rider. In 2007, he began working freelance, scoring his first video game for White Moon Dreams. He has also written scores to many other television and film projects, including a documentary "Holy Man: The USA v Douglas White” narrated by Martin Sheen. His projects have premiered at film festivals such as Toronto, Boston, Naples, and Montreal.

=== Redemption (2010–present) ===
Since 2003, Spaeth had been working intermittently on a new piano album, which would be entitled Redemption. A decade in the making, he has often indicated it was a very personal, coming-of-age project for him. Currently, a release is planned for early 2013.

== Filmography ==
2012: Holy Man: The USA vs Douglas White (documentary)

2010: Finding God in the City of Angels (documentary)

2007: Spider-Man 3 (score preparation, additional orchestration)

2007: Ghost Rider (score preparation, additional orchestration)

2007: Lucky You (score preparation, additional orchestration)

2003: Finding Home (music arranger, musician: piano)

== Discography ==
1997–2001: Cobalt Blue (a cinematic-piano CD he completed in high school and garnered 1.6 million downloads on MP3.com)

2013: Redemption

== See also ==
- Summerfest
