= Andrew Lees =

Andrew Lees may refer to:

- Andrew Lees (environmentalist) (1949–1994), scientist and environmentalist
- Andrew Lees (neurologist) (born 1947), English neurologist
- Andrew Lees (vaccinologist) (born 1953), American biochemist
- Andrew Lees (rugby union) (born 1979), Australian rugby union referee
- Andrew Lees (actor) (born 1985), Australian actor

== See also ==
- Andrew Lee (disambiguation)
