= Brooks Stevens Design Associates =

American industrial design firm

Brooks Stevens
- Company type: Private
- Industry: Product development
- Founded: 1934 in Milwaukee, Wisconsin
- Headquarters: Allenton, Wisconsin
- Website: www.brooksstevens.com

Brooks Stevens, Inc., also known as Brooks Stevens Design Associates and Brooks Stevens Design, is a product development firm headquartered in Milwaukee, Wisconsin. Brooks Stevens's services included research, industrial design, engineering, prototyping, project management, and graphic design.

== History ==
Brooks Stevens Design was established by Clifford Brooks Stevens in 1934. In 1954, Brooks Stevens, the founder, popularized the term "planned obsolescence" as a cornerstone to product evolution. The phrase was not intended to refer to building things that deteriorate easily, but to "instilling in the buyer the desire to own something a little newer, a little better, a little sooner. Stevens's philosophies have been said to define the industrial design profession. The firm has designed products from toasters to automobiles and heavy equipment, including the 1949 Twin Cities Hiawatha and Olympian Hiawatha trains with "Skytop Lounge" cars.

In 2007, the founder's son, Kipp Stevens, retired and sold Brooks Stevens to Ingenium Product Development, expanding the company's product coverage and engineering capabilities.

Today, Brooks Stevens designs and engineers both consumer and heavy industrial products.
