= Nenno, Wisconsin =

- Unincorporated community
- Location within Wisconsin Location within the United States
- Coordinates: 43°26′46″N 88°23′29″W
- Country: United States
- State: Wisconsin
- County: Washington
- Elevation: 1,066 ft (325 m)
- Time zone: UTC-6 (Central (CST))
  - Summer (DST): UTC-5 (CDT)
- Area code: 262
- GNIS feature ID: 1570174

Nenno is an unincorporated community located in the town of Addison, Washington County, Wisconsin, United States.

== The Yellowstone Trail ==
Nenno is on the old Yellowstone Trail, one of the first transcontinental highways. The north-south road through Nenno is now Wisconsin Highway 175, but was previously highway 41, and before that highway 15. On the east side of the road across from the old church is a building dating to around 1870 which was a hotel, store, etc. Just to the north of it is an old shed which opens to the south. It was used as a horse stable. The community was named for Prussian emigrant Nicholas "Nick" Nenno. Upon his arrival in 1833, he operated a hotel, general store, and a brewery. The Post Office was opened in June 1857 by its first Postmaster, George Smith.
