= Kaachi =

2020–2023 British K-pop girl group

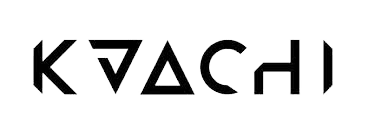

Background information
- Origin: London, England
- Genres: Pop, K-pop
- Years active: 2020–2023
- Label: FrontRow Records
- Past members: Nicole; Coco; Dani; Chunseo
- Website: Official website

Kaachi (stylised as KAACHI; Korean: 가치; RR: Gachi; lit. 'value') were a British girl group formed by FrontRow Records. They debuted on 15 April 2020 with the digital single "Your Turn." Originally debuting as a 4-member group, Dani left the group on 23 July 2021, followed by Coco who left on 3 September 2022.

The group officially disbanded on 28 February 2023, following the departure of its remaining members Nicole and Chunseo.

On August 11, 2023, Coco, Nicole, and Chunseo returned as ATTI with the pre-debut single "Blue". The group made its official debut with EP Peaches on October 6, 2023, featuring the lead single "Regeneration".

== History ==
=== Pre-debut ===
Kaachi was formed in January 2020 through FrontRow Records. The original lineup consisted of members Nicole, Dani, Chunseo, and KG, all of whom were former members of UJJN; a British K-pop dance cover group. However, KG quietly departed from the group for personal reasons sometime in January and was replaced by Miso. On 29 February 2020, Kaachi performed their debut song "Your Turn" prior to its release at Super Kpop Weekends in London. Miso left the group in March 2020, and was replaced by Coco.

=== 2020–2023: "Your Turn", "Photo Magic", lineup changes and disbandment ===
In February 2020, FrontRow Records announced that Kaachi's debut song would be named "Your Turn". The single was officially released on 15 April 2020, with the music video being released on 29 April. The song has been described as a fusion of Europop, K-Pop and hip-hop. The song was criticized by K-Pop fans over their alleged lack of training, three of the group's four members lacking Korean heritage, and for taking shortcuts in the Korean idol training process. However, many also praised the group for its ground-breaking concept of K-Pop being open to people from around the globe and because the group took a new spin on the genre. On 29 April 2020, Kaachi's producer, Monica Lee, uploaded a video on YouTube to clarify the truth about Kaachi, including rumours that the group were formed by Simon Cowell and that they had made fun of other idols. On 26 May 2020, Kaachi were featured in their own mini-documentary, The UK’s First K-Pop Girl Group, which was posted by Channel 4 onto the networks’ social media pages. The episode focused on the hours before and during the filming of the music video shoot of their debut single. The mini-documentary drew criticism to the girls, due to them not finishing the choreography to the song until the night before the music video was filmed. Rumours had also circulated about the group plagiarising other K-Pop groups, which also drew more negative attention towards them.

On 24 September 2020, it was announced that Kaachi would be making their first comeback with the pre-release single "Photo Magic" in late October, which would be included on the group’s first mini-album that had been slated for a 2021 release. The group performed in Joy Ruckus Club's Asian-American virtual music festival on 17 October 2020. On 4 November, their second single "Photo Magic" was released along with a music video. The song was described as a fusion of British grime, hip-hop rhythms, and energetic K-Pop by the song’s producers. On 1 January 2021, they performed the song at the London's New Year's Day Parade. Kaachi released the Spanish versions of their previous two releases; "Your Turn" and "Photo Magic", on 30 June.

On 23 July 2021, FrontRow Records confirmed that Dani's contract had expired and that she would leave the group, with Dani also making a statement on her social media accounts about her departure. On 19 August, they released their third single "The One Thing", the first as a trio since Dani's departure from the group. Kaachi appeared at the Joy Ruckus Club's New Beginnings with K-Pop Superfest festival on 27 August, where they premiered the song "Extra Special", which would be officially released on 2 September. On 25 October 2021, the group released their fifth single, "Get Up", along with a music video. The song is a remake of a song by Baby Vox of the same name, and was also performed at the Joy Ruckus Club's New Beginnings with K-pop Superfest earlier in the year. The group performed live at the London New Year's Day Parade 2022 on 1 January, where they sang "Get Up".

In July 2022, the group performed at the TLP Summer Con in Tenerife. On 2 September, a statement was posted onto Kaachi's social media pages stating that Coco had left the group. In November, they participated in STAR IZ BORN; a virtual reality K-Pop festival in Metaverse.

On 1 January 2023, the duo performed the song "The One Thing" at the London New Year's Day Parade.

On 28 February 2023, Kaachi officially disbanded, after its remaining members Nicole and Chunseo decided to depart from the group and the label.

Nicole, Chunseo (Ruth) and Coco continue to work alongside each other in their independent group ATTI.

== Members ==
=== Final line-up ===
- Nicole (니콜) (original member)
- Chunseo (준서) (original member)

=== Past members ===
- Dani (다니) (original member; left 23 July 2021)
- Coco (코코) (joined 28 March 2020; left 2 September 2022)

=== Pre-debut ===
- Miso (미소) (joined 1 February 2020; left 15 March 2020)
- KG (original member; left 31 January 2020)

=== Timeline ===
- Purple line (vertical) indicates a release.

== Discography ==
=== Singles ===
Title	Year	Peak chart positions	Album
Title	Year	KOR	Album
"Your Turn" (Note: Spanish versions of "Your Turn" and "Photo Magic" were simultaneously released on 30 June 2021.)	2020	—	Non-album single
"Photo Magic"	2020	—	Non-album single
"The One Thing"	2021	—	Non-album single
"Extra Special"	2021	—	Non-album single
"Get Up"	2021	—	Non-album single
"—" denotes a recording that did not chart or was not released in that territory
