= London's New Year's Day Parade =

Annual street parade

Coordinates: 51°30′21.66″N 0°7′49.45″W

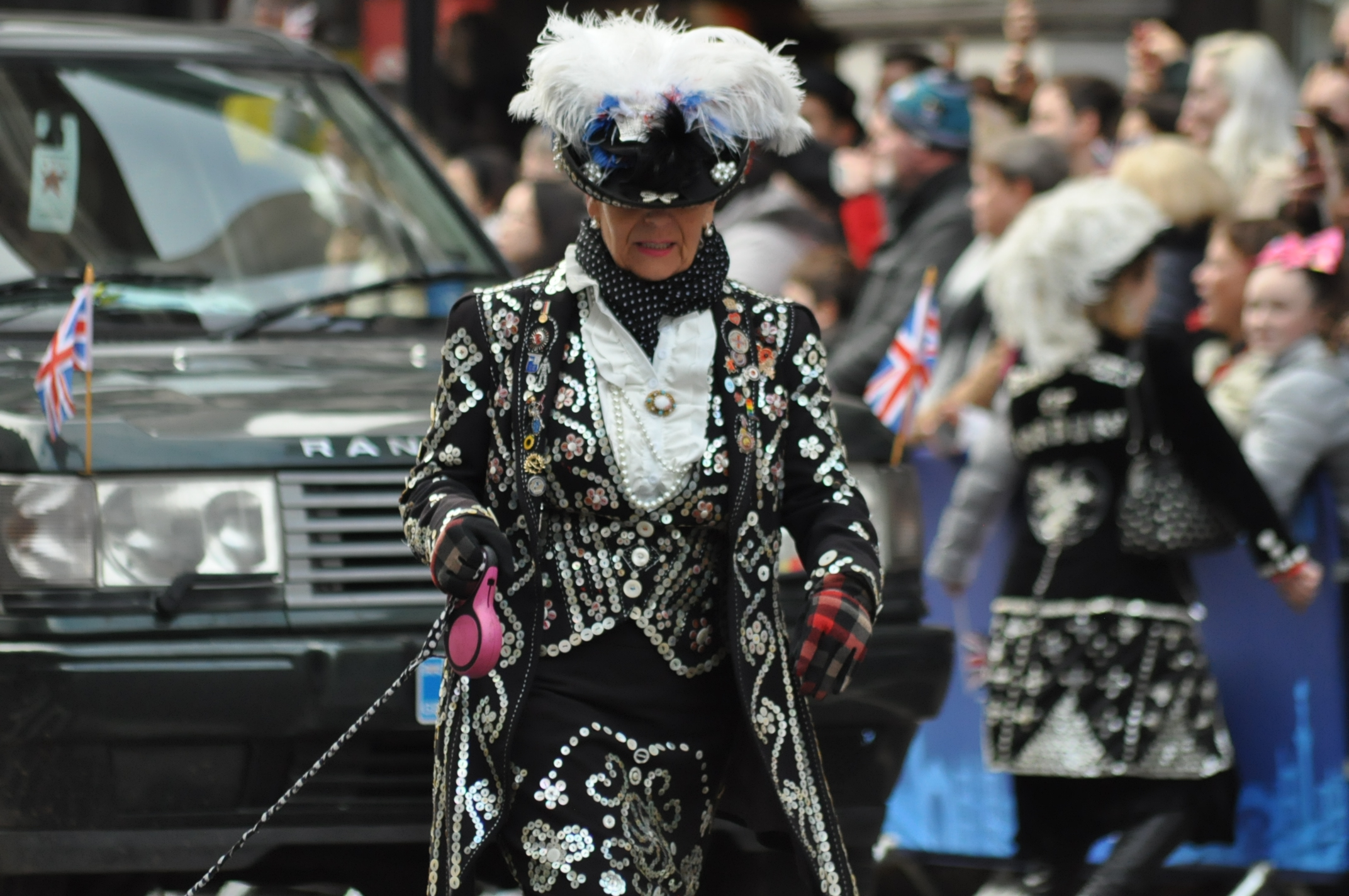
A pearly queen at the 2019 parade

The London Parade (formerly the London's New Year's Day Parade or LNYDP) is an annual parade through the streets of the West End of London on 1 January. The parade first took place in 1987, as the Lord Mayor of Westminster's Big Parade. The parade was renamed in 1994 and 2025. For the year 2000 only, it was called the Millennium Parade.

The parade went virtual in 2021 but returned live for 2022, albeit scaled-down, due to the COVID-19 pandemic. 500,000 spectators attended the 2023 parade.

== Organisation ==
In 2008, the London parade was reported as being the biggest New Year's Day street event of its kind. It attracts around a million live spectators and US television network PBS (more than 250 stations) cover the entire event live, reaching millions of viewers world-wide. There is ticket-only grandstand seating at various points along the route. Destination Events are the organisers of parade with Joe Bone serving as the parade's Executive Director

== Parade route ==
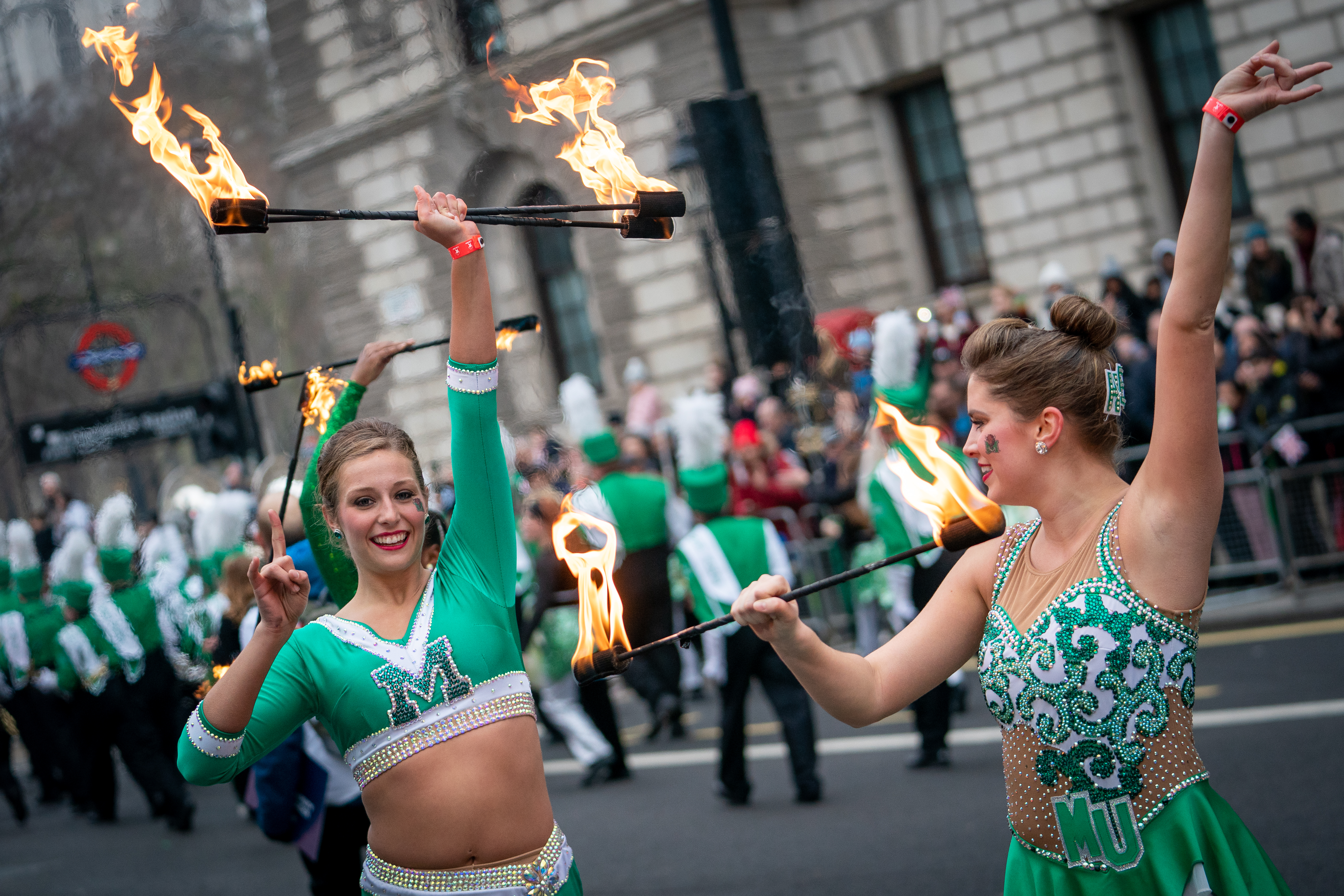
Baton twirlers taking part at LNYDP

The parade route is two miles (3.2 km) long. Before 2010, it began at Parliament Square in Westminster, continuing along Parliament Street and Whitehall to Trafalgar Square. It then continued along Cockspur Street and Regent Street. The final section was along Piccadilly and the parade ended at Green Park.

In 2010, the parade route was reversed to "appease US television broadcasters" and to "give the American audience the best views of the capital's landmarks, such as the Elizabeth Tower of the Palace of Westminster (The Houses of Parliament, also known as Big Ben) and Trafalgar Square". The revised route started at the Ritz Hotel, along Piccadilly to Piccadilly Circus, down Regent Street, then along Pall Mall to Trafalgar Square, then along Whitehall to Parliament Square.

== Participants ==
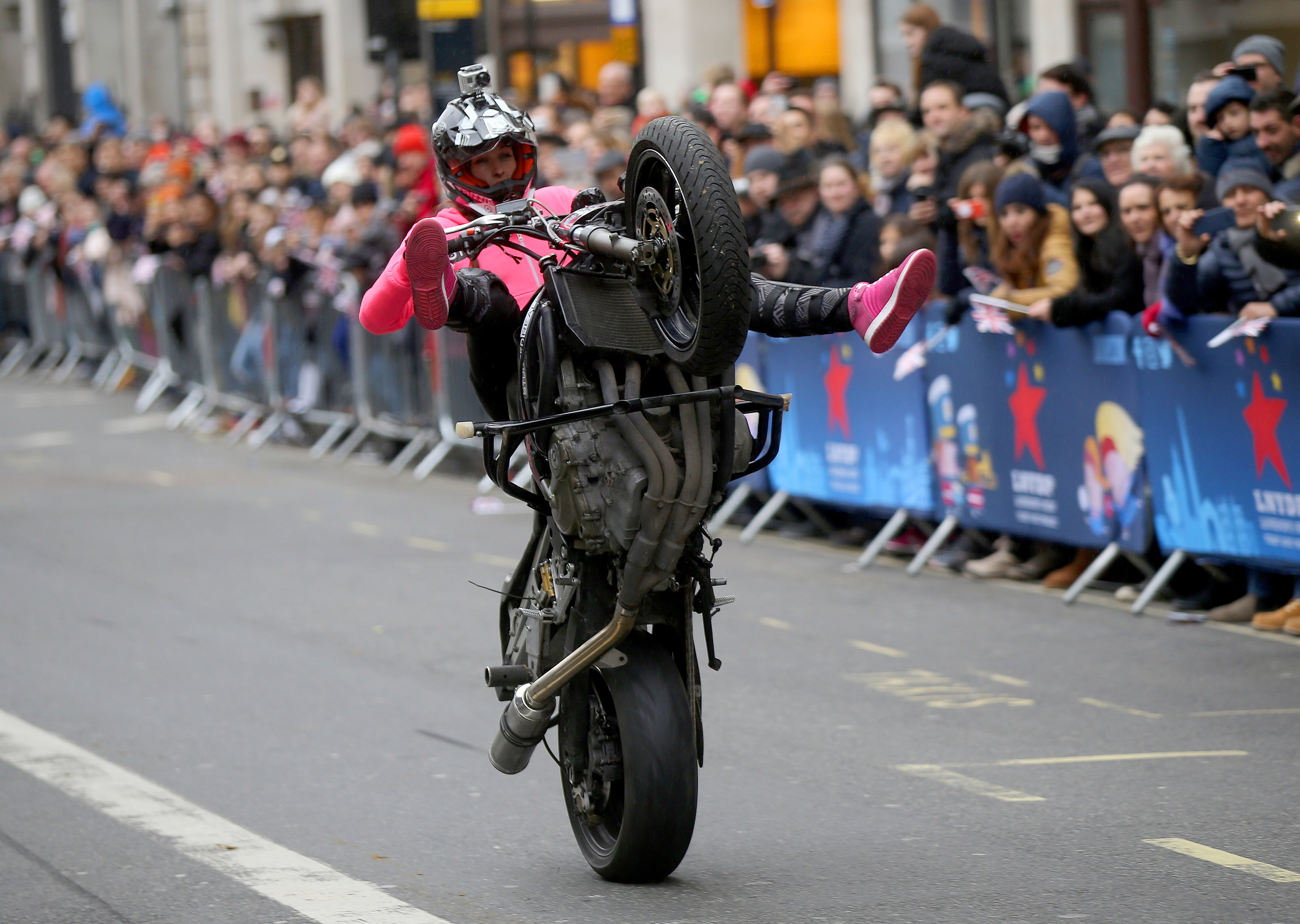
Stunt riders taking part at LNYDP

The parade is used to raise funds for charities in London and representatives from each of the 32 London boroughs are encouraged to take part as a "borough entry", judged as part of the event. The parade has raised “the best part of £2 million” for London charities since its inception. The competition did not take place in 2021 or 2022 due to the Covid 19 pandemic.

=== Marching bands ===
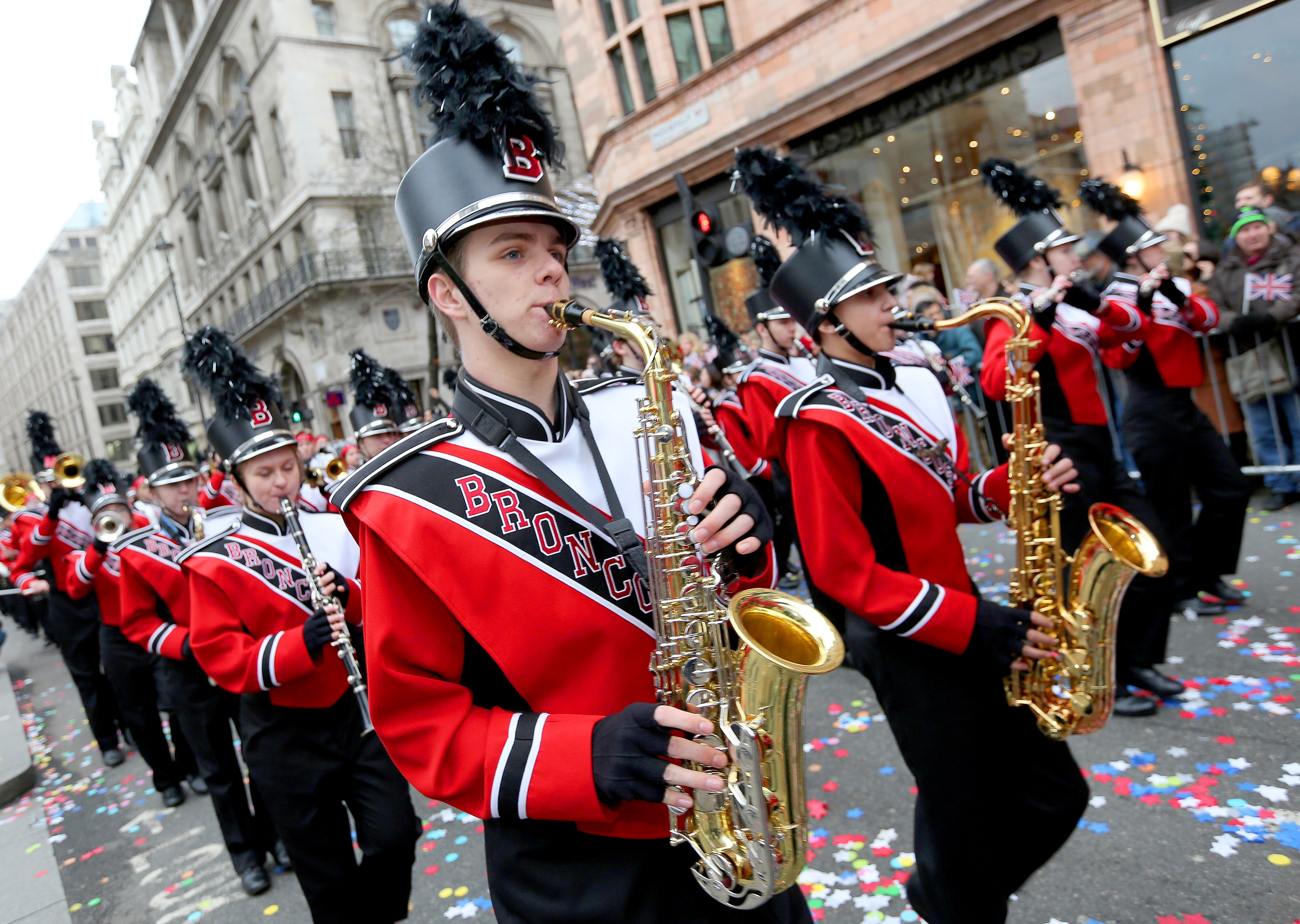
A marching band performing at the event in 2018

The event broadcast is popular in the United States, receiving an estimated 100 million viewers, and each parade features marching bands from multiple US universities.

The Pride of New Mexico Marching Band from New Mexico State University was the first collegiate marching band to participate, taking part in the first Lord Mayor of Westminster's Big Parade in 1987.

=== Scouts ===
Over 200 Scouts from across London, led by the Enfield District Scout Band, took part in the 2007 parade, heralding the start of the UK's 2007 Centenary of Scouting celebrations.

London's town crier is also part of the parade.

=== Musical groups ===
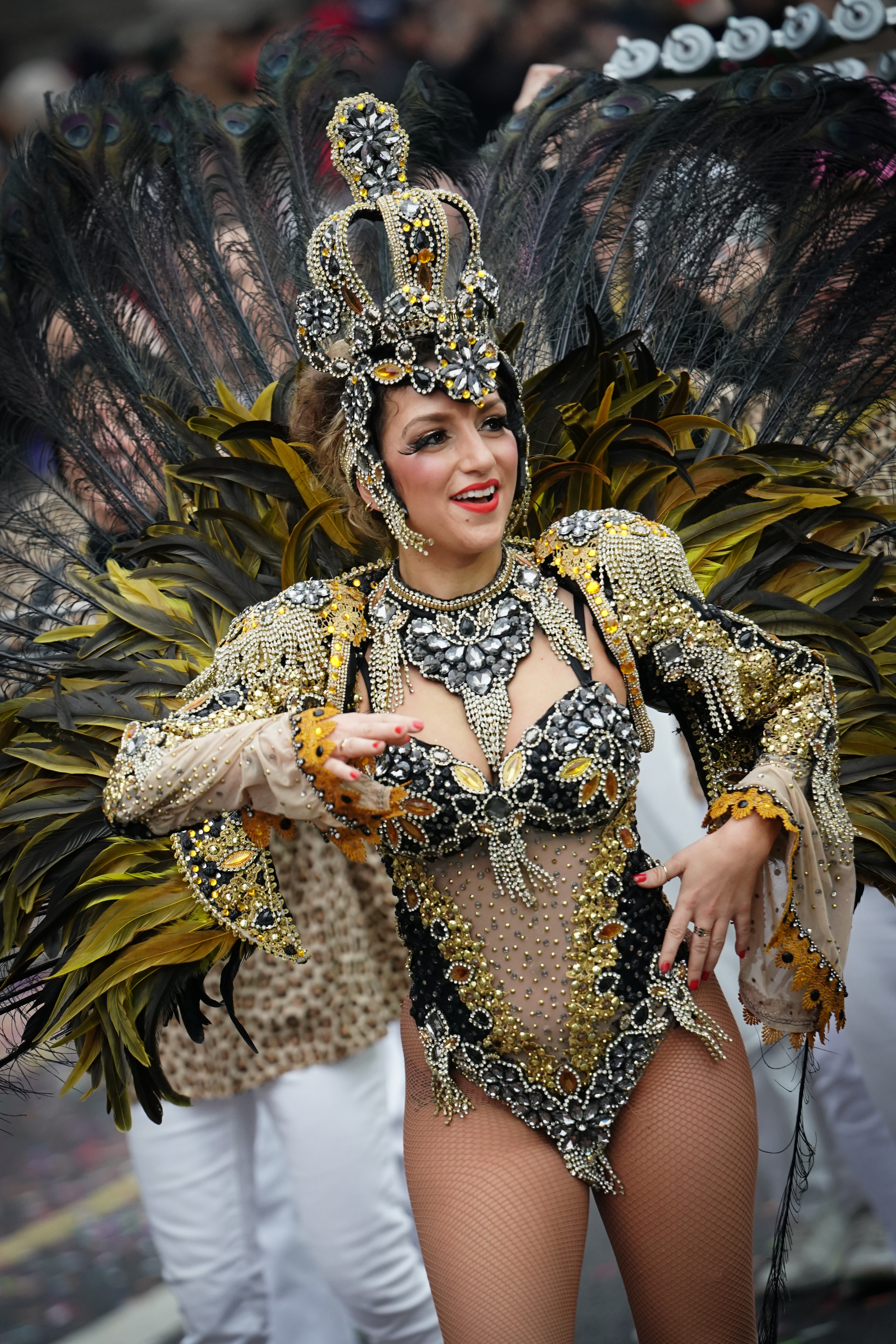
London School of Samba performing at LNYDP

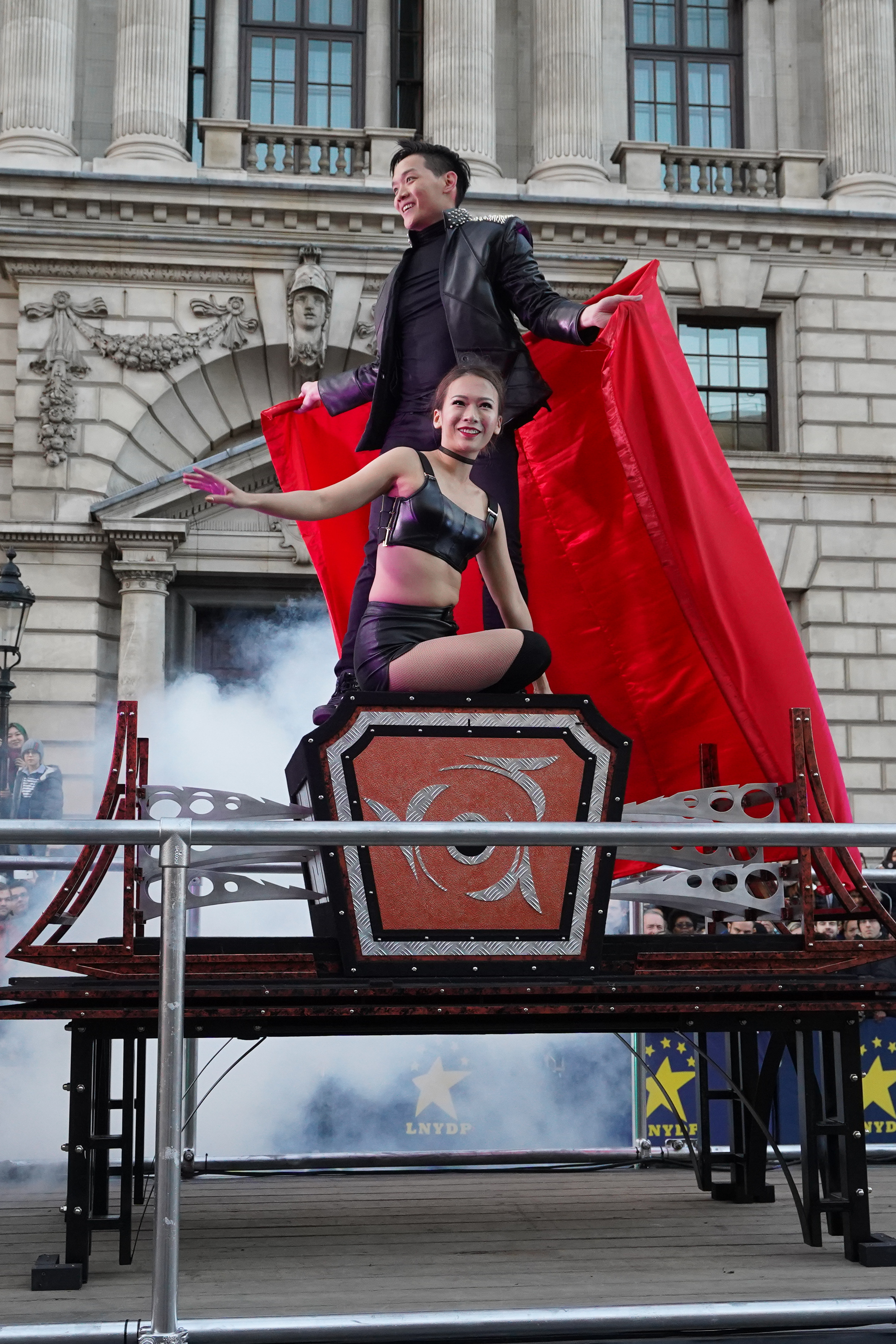
Andrew Lee performing at LNYDP

In 2019 Megan McKenna sang a duet with US country music performer Kaleb Lee. Alongside Megan McKenna, illusionist Andrew Lee became the first Malaysian to take part in London's New Year's Day Parade. In 2021, the British K-pop girl group Kaachi, gave a virtual performance. Jamie Cullum and Sophie Ellis-Bextor added to the virtual spectacular in 2021, joining KAACHI and other performers. Television and Broadway star Marisha Wallace headlined LNYDP 2022 alongside a roster including The Voice UK winner Molly Hocking and DJ Bodalia.

The 2023 parade featured headline performances from Scouting For Girls and Toploader.

The 2024 parade featured headline performances from Chesney Hawkes and Boyzlife. Rachael O'Connor performed the LNYDP anthem.

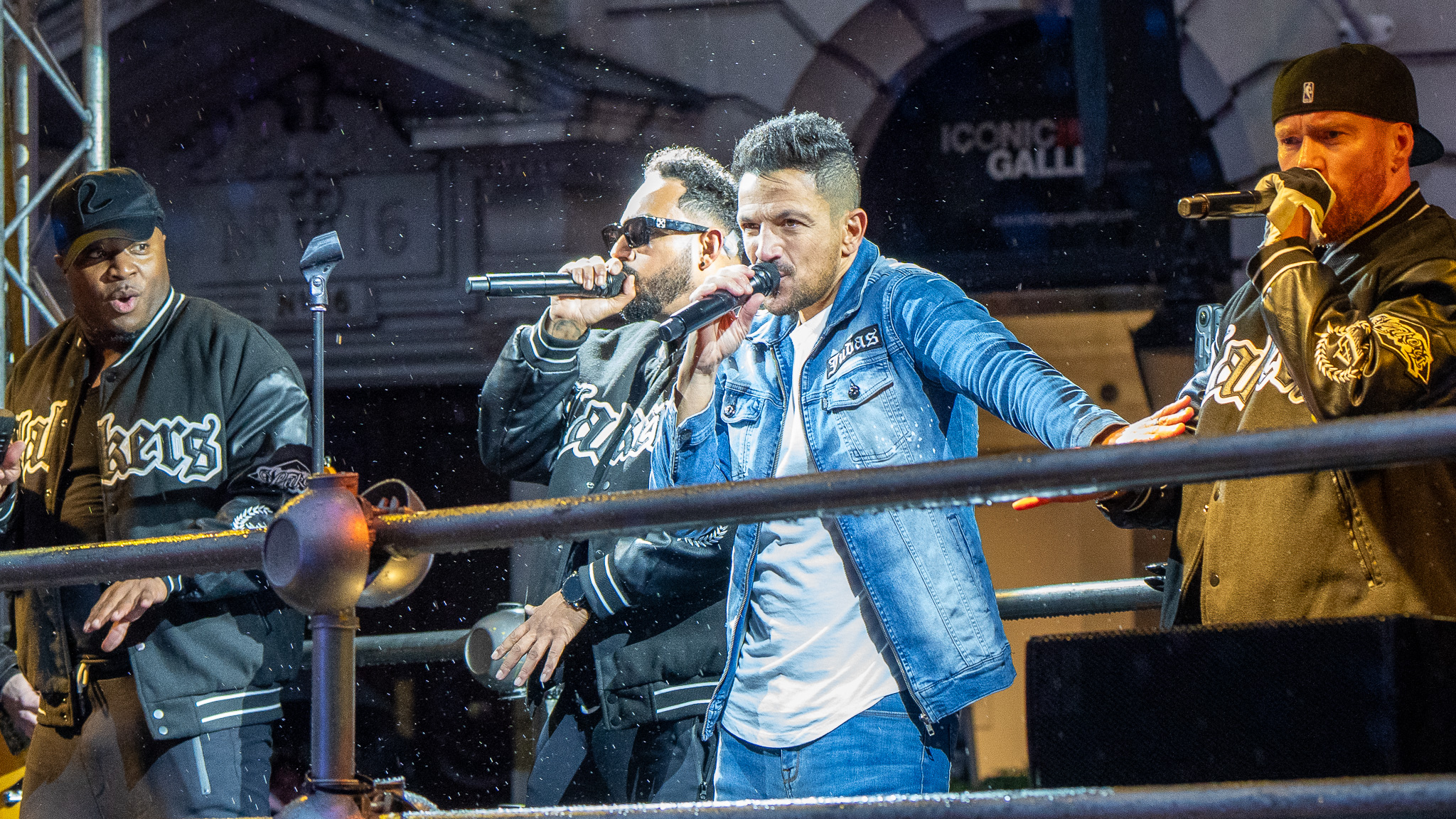
Peter Andre performing at LNYDP 2025

The 2025 parade was headlined by Peter Andre, with BBC Radio One's Rickie Haywood-Williams and Melvin Odoom performing on the DJ Toot Bus.

Sam Ryder, Britain's Eurovision hero and chart-topping singer and the legendary Heather Small headlined the 2026 London Parade.
