= Allenton, Wisconsin =

Unincorporated community in Washington County, Wisconsin

- Census-designated place
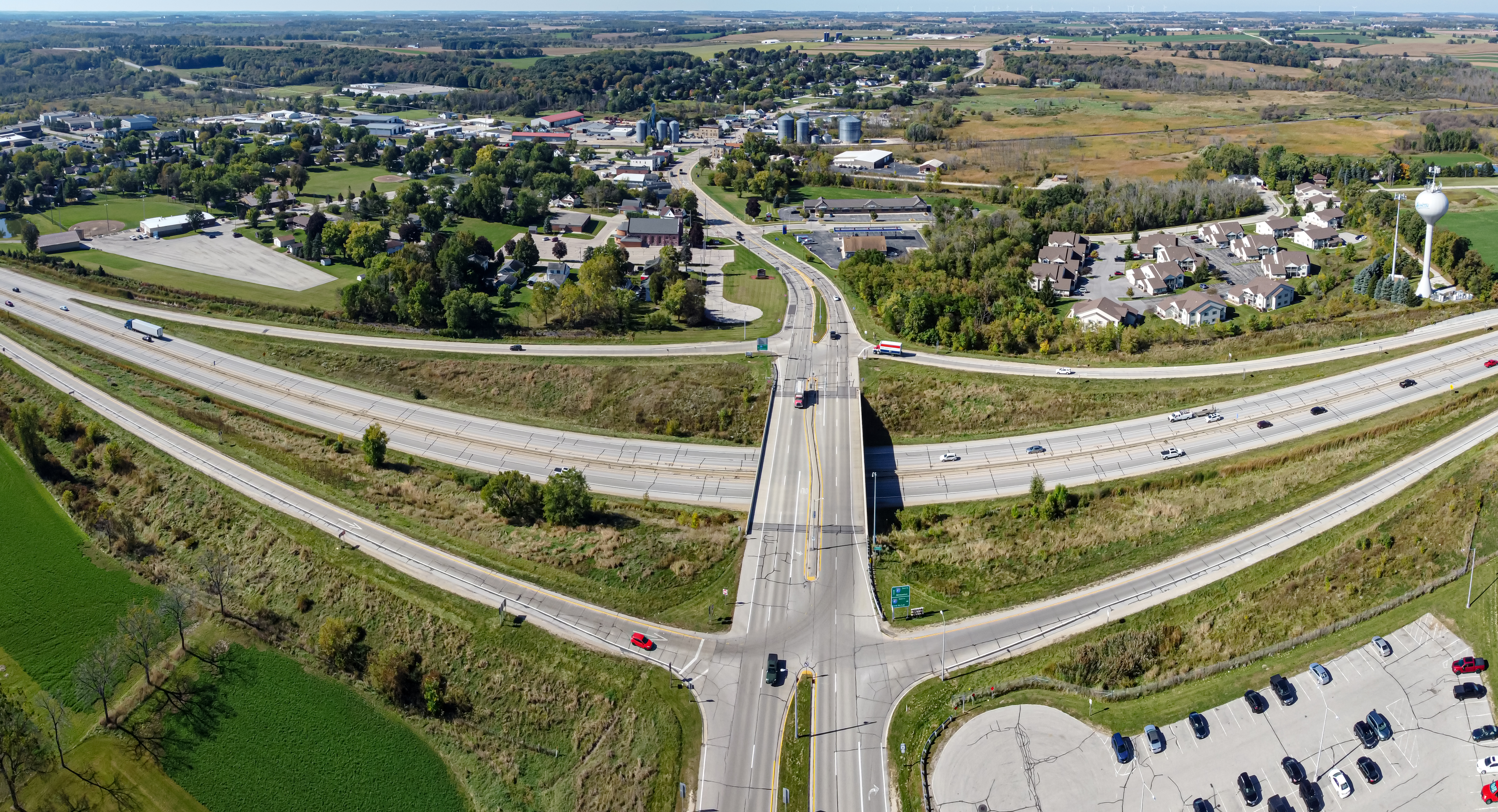
- Wis-33 and I-41 junction in town

- Location within Wisconsin Location within the United States
- Coordinates: 43°25′15″N 88°20′27″W
- Country: United States
- State: Wisconsin
- County: Washington

Area
  - Land: 1.45 sq mi (3.75 km^{2})
- Elevation: 958.00 ft (291.998 m)

Population (2020)
  - Total: 859
- Time zone: UTC-6 (Central (CST))
  - Summer (DST): UTC-5 (CDT)
- ZIP Code: 53002
- Area code: 262

Allenton is an unincorporated census-designated place in the town of Addison in Washington County, Wisconsin, United States. It is located near the intersection of Wisconsin Highway 33 and Interstate 41. It is on a line of the Canadian National Railway, parent company of the Wisconsin Central Ltd. railroad company. Allenton has a post office with ZIP code 53002. As of the 2020 census, its population was 859.

== Geography ==
Allenton is located at latitude 43.421 and longitude -88.341 at a mean elevation of 958 feet. Allenton has an area of 1.446 square miles (3.75 km^{2}), all land. The Rock River passes through the town.

== Demographics ==
Historical population
Census	Pop.	Note	%±
2010	824		—
2020	859		4.2%
U.S. Decennial Census

== Economy ==
Brooks Stevens Design Associates, a product design firm, is based in Allenton, as is Zuern Building Products, a chain of lumber yards in Wisconsin. Maysteel and Boyd are also situated there.

== Education ==
- Allenton Elementary School, which is part of the School District of Slinger, is located in the community.

== Notable people ==
- Alfred G. Becker, Wisconsin State Representative
- John Reiser, former general manager of Roush Racing NASCAR Busch Series and NASCAR Craftsman Truck Series race shops
- Robbie Reiser, former NASCAR driver, Winston Cup championship crew chief, team manager at Roush Fenway Racing

== Images ==
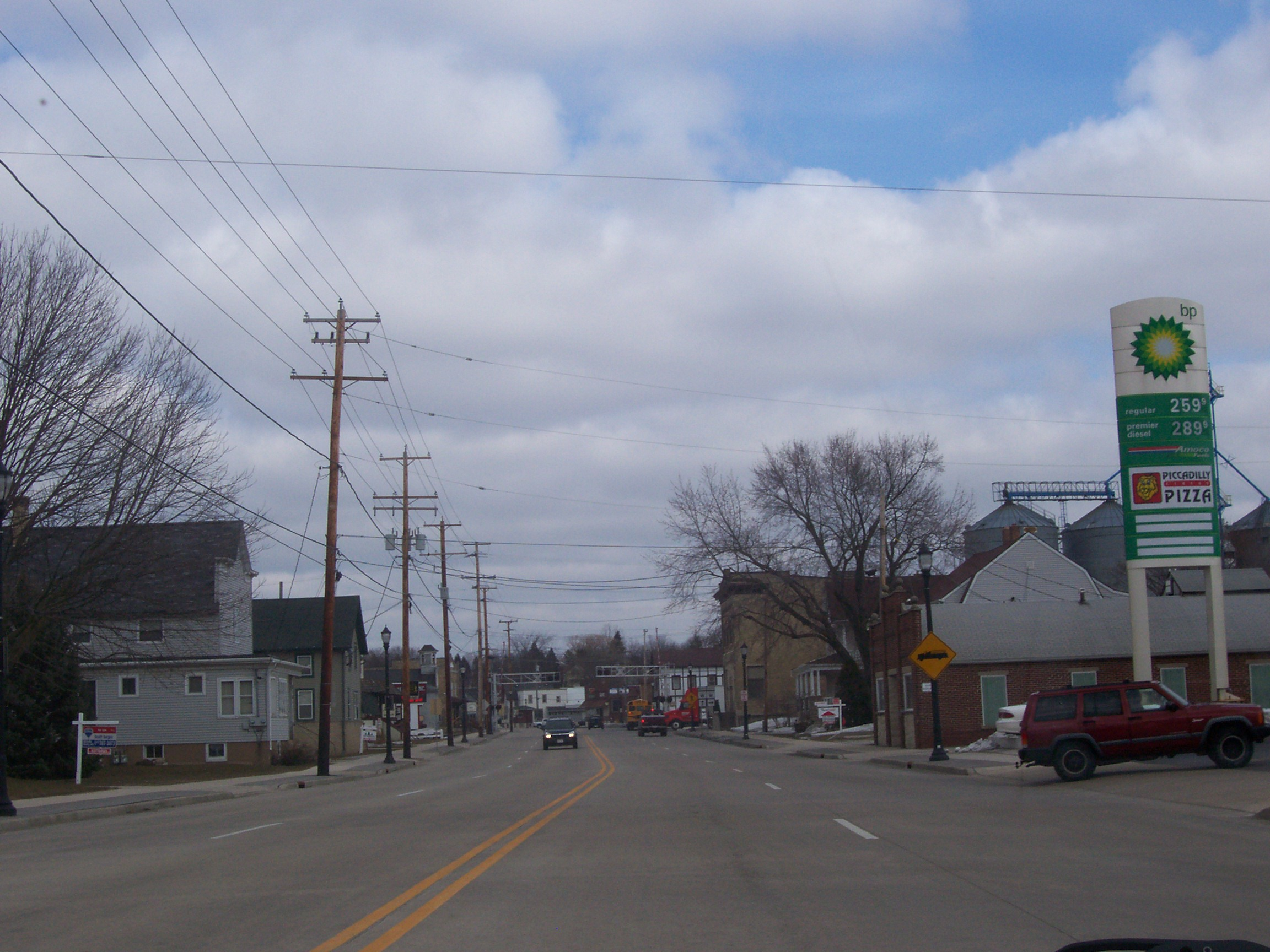
Allenton

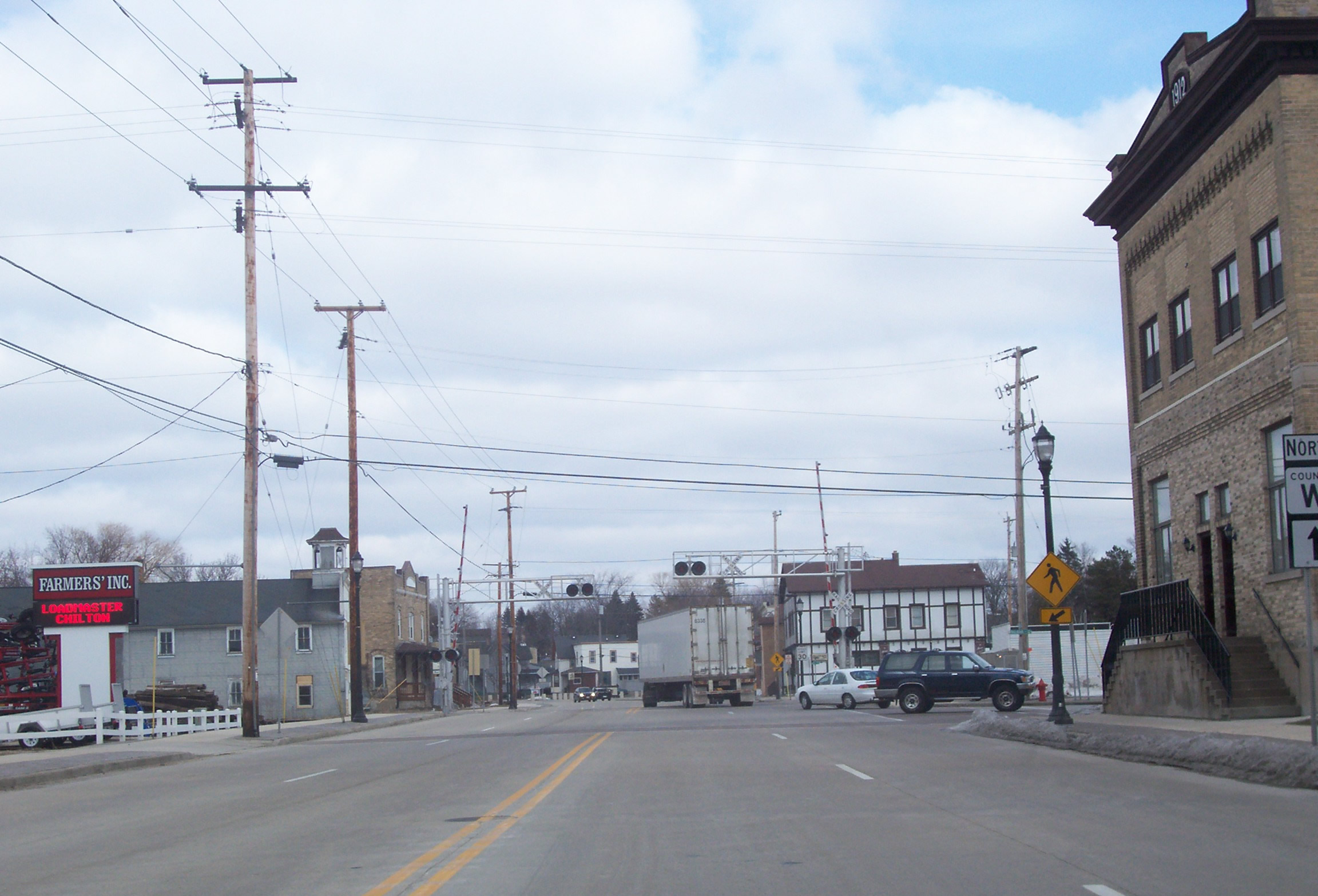
Allenton
