= Slinger School District =

American school district in southeastern Wisconsin

The School District of Slinger educates students from K4 through 12th grade residing in the southeastern Wisconsin municipalities of Slinger, Addison, St. Lawrence, Polk, and portions of Richfield, Jackson, Hartford, and West Bend, in Washington County, Wisconsin.

== Schools ==
The Slinger High School was remodeled in 1991 and 1998; adding district office space, gymnasium, band room, cafeteria, main office and library, as well as new classrooms. In 2008, an undeveloped area in the high school was constructed into a weight lifting room.

In 1995, middle school students moved into the new Slinger Middle School, creating more space for faculty, staff and students in the subsequently remodeled Slinger Elementary School.

In 2002, a new elementary school was built in Addison.

== Athletics ==
Slinger is a member of the North Shore Conference.
