= Slinger, Wisconsin =

Village in Washington County, Wisconsin

- Village
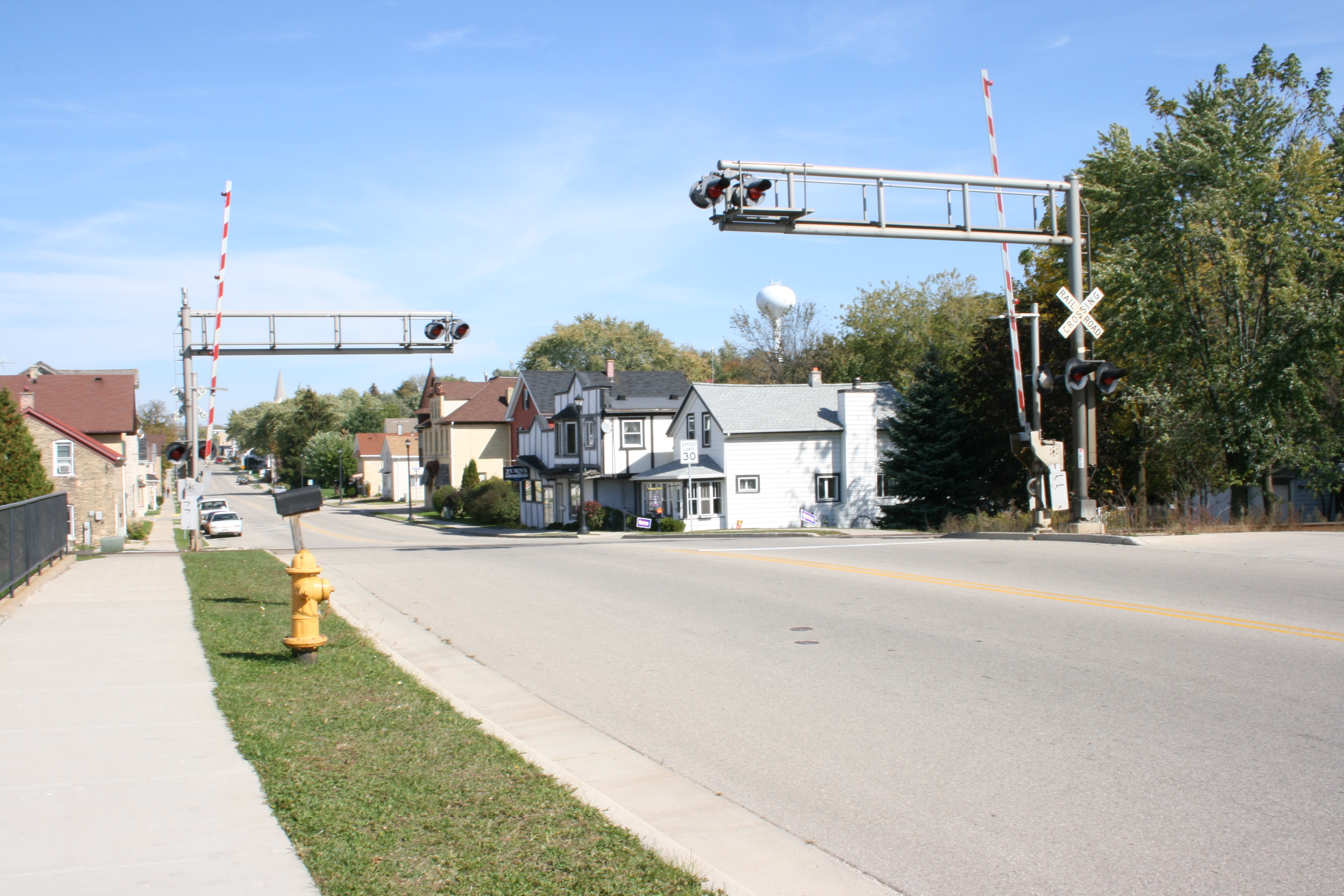
- Facing NE near the railroad tracks
- Nickname: Village of the Seven Hills
- Location of Slinger in Washington County, Wisconsin.
- Coordinates: 43°19′42″N 88°17′0″W
- Country: United States
- State: Wisconsin
- County: Washington
- Incorporated: 1869; 157 years ago

Area
  - Total: 5.26 sq mi (13.63 km^{2})
  - Land: 5.24 sq mi (13.57 km^{2})
  - Water: 0.023 sq mi (0.06 km^{2})
- Elevation: 1,063 ft (324 m)

Population (2020)
  - Total: 5,992
  - Density: 1,062.1/sq mi (410.07/km^{2})
- Time zone: UTC-6 (Central (CST))
  - Summer (DST): UTC-5 (CDT)
- Postal code: 53086
- Area code: 262
- FIPS code: 55-74400
- GNIS feature ID: 1574278
- Website: www.vi.slinger.wi.gov

Slinger (formerly Schleisingerville) is a village in Washington County, Wisconsin, United States. The population was 5,992 at the 2020 census, and Slinger is also part of the Milwaukee Metropolitan Area.

== Toponymy ==
The village was originally known as Schleisingerville, after Baruch Schleisinger Weil, a merchant and politician who developed the community as a railroad stop in the 1840s and 1850s. Locals sometimes abbreviated the four-syllable name to "Slinger," and on May 3, 1921, the village residents overwhelmingly voted to make Slinger the official name.

== History ==
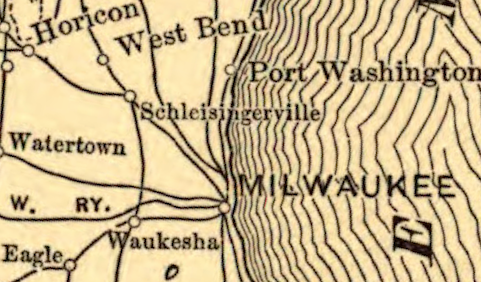
Rail map of Wisconsin from 1900 centered on Schleisingerville

In the early 19th century, the Slinger area was home to Potawatomi Native Americans, who surrendered the land the United States Federal Government in 1833 through the 1833 Treaty of Chicago, which (after being ratified in 1835) required them to leave Wisconsin by 1838. While many Potawatomis moved west of the Mississippi River to Kansas, some chose to remain, and were referred to as "strolling Potawatomi" in contemporary documents because many of them were migrants who subsisted by squatting on their ancestral lands, which were now owned by white settlers. One band of strolling Potawatomi travelled through Dodge, Jefferson, and Washington counties, and was led by Chief Kewaskum, who had a camp on Pike Lake, west of Slinger. Kewaskum was friendly with the white settlers who began arriving in the 1840s. He died sometime between 1847 and 1850, and the early settlers named the Village of Kewaskum in his honor. Itinerant Potawatomis lived in Washington County into the late 19th century, when many of them gathered in northern Wisconsin to form the Forest County Potawatomi Community.

Baruch Schleisinger Weil, a Jewish-American immigrant from Strasbourg, Alsace, laid the village's foundation when he bought 2,000 acres of land in Washington County on November 1, 1845. He soon built a general store to serve local farmers, loggers and Native Americans, and later opened a distillery. Other merchants and manufacturers, including blacksmiths, shoemakers, wagon makers and tanners, began settling in the area, which was called "Schleisingerville" in Weil's honor. For the first two decades of its history, the community was part of the Town of Polk, which was organized on January 21, 1846.

In 1850, Weil opened a post office and in 1855 he worked to have the La Crosse and Milwaukee Railroad pass through the community. The rail line was completed on August 23, 1855. The village grew because of its rail connections and incorporated out of some of the Town of Polk's land in 1869. From the mid-19th century into the mid-20th century, the community was predominantly rural, and most of the businesses supplied farmers and area residents.

In its first decades, the village had a distinctly German culture. The first Catholic church opened in 1862, and the first Lutheran Church opened in 1863. In the late 19th and early 20th centuries, the village had a Turnverein and a German-language weekly newspaper called Der Botschafter (English: The Messenger).

Following World War II, the village saw the growth of heavy industry, including the Slinger Foundry Company, which manufactures parts for Briggs & Stratton and Harley-Davidson. Between 1970 and 2000, the village experienced rapid population growth and real estate development, and Washington County became increasingly suburbanized.

== Geography ==
Slinger is located at 43°19′42″N 88°17′0″W (43.328466, -88.283461).

According to the United States Census Bureau, the village has a total area of 5.31 square miles (13.75 km^{2}), of which 5.29 square miles (13.70 km^{2}) is land and 0.02 square miles (0.05 km^{2}) is water.

Slinger is known as the "village of seven hills" as it rests in the heart of the Kettle Moraine.

=== Climate ===
Slinger

Climate chart (precipitation, max. and min. temperature)
J	F	M	A	M	J	J	A	S	O	N	D
85 −5 −14	79 −4 −13	80 5 −7	152 18 2	122 21 5	146 25 13	92 26 17	92 25 16	72 21 11	113 14 7	65 9 −2	73 −4 −10
- █ Average max. and min. temperatures in °C
- █ Precipitation totals in mm
Imperial conversion
J	F	M	A	M	J	J	A	S	O	N	D
3.3 23 7	3.1 25 9	3.1 41 19	6 64 36	4.8 70 41	5.7 77 55	3.6 79 63	3.6 77 61	2.8 70 52	4.4 57 45	2.6 48 28	2.9 25 14
- █ Average max. and min. temperatures in °F
- █ Precipitation totals in inches

== Demographics ==
Historical population
Census	Pop.	Note	%±
1880	358		—
1890	432		20.7%
1900	549		27.1%
1910	538		−2.0%
1920	730		35.7%
1930	769		5.3%
1940	775		0.8%
1950	919		18.6%
1960	1,161		26.3%
1970	1,216		4.7%
1980	1,612		32.6%
1990	2,340		45.2%
2000	3,901		66.7%
2010	5,068		29.9%
2020	5,992		18.2%
2022 (est.)	6,294	▲	5.0%
U.S. Decennial Census

=== 2010 census ===
As of the census of 2010, there were 5,068 people, 2,029 households, and 1,390 families living in the village. The population density was 958.0 inhabitants per square mile (369.9/km^{2}). There were 2,182 housing units at an average density of 412.5 per square mile (159.3/km^{2}). The racial makeup of the village was 97.2% White, 0.5% African American, 0.2% Native American, 0.6% Asian, 0.3% from other races, and 1.1% from two or more races. Hispanic or Latino of any race were 2.3% of the population.

There were 2,029 households, of which 36.1% had children under the age of 18 living with them, 52.7% were married couples living together, 11.0% had a female householder with no husband present, 4.8% had a male householder with no wife present, and 31.5% were non-families. 25.2% of all households were made up of individuals, and 7.5% had someone living alone who was 65 years of age or older. The average household size was 2.48 and the average family size was 2.99.

The median age in the village was 37.2 years. 26.4% of residents were under the age of 18; 6.6% were between the ages of 18 and 24; 28.8% were from 25 to 44; 27.9% were from 45 to 64; and 10.3% were 65 years of age or older. The gender makeup of the village was 49.0% male and 51.0% female.

=== 2000 census ===
As of the census of 2000, there were 3,901 people, 1,562 households, and 1,040 families living in the village. The population density was 1,046.8 people per square mile (403.8/km^{2}). There were 1,607 housing units at an average density of 431.2 per square mile (166.3/km^{2}). The racial makeup of the village was 97.95% White, 0.26% African American, 0.15% Native American, 0.18% Asian, 0.05% Pacific Islander, 0.41% from other races, and 1.00% from two or more races. Hispanic or Latino of any race were 1.38% of the population.

There were 1,562 households, out of which 34.7% had children under the age of 18 living with them, 51.8% were married couples living together, 10.2% had a female householder with no husband present, and 33.4% were non-families. 26.7% of all households were made up of individuals, and 9.0% had someone living alone who was 65 years of age or older. The average household size was 2.46 and the average family size was 3.02.

In the village, the population was spread out, with 26.8% under the age of 18, 7.4% from 18 to 24, 32.5% from 25 to 44, 21.1% from 45 to 64, and 12.2% who were 65 years of age or older. The median age was 36 years. For every 100 females, there were 97.0 males. For every 100 females age 18 and over, there were 95.2 males.

The median income for a household in the village was $47,125, and the median income for a family was $55,607. Males had a median income of $40,783 versus $25,723 for females. The per capita income for the village was $21,450. About 6.0% of families and 6.4% of the population were below the poverty line, including 6.2% of those under age 18 and 10.7% of those age 65 or over.

== Recreation ==
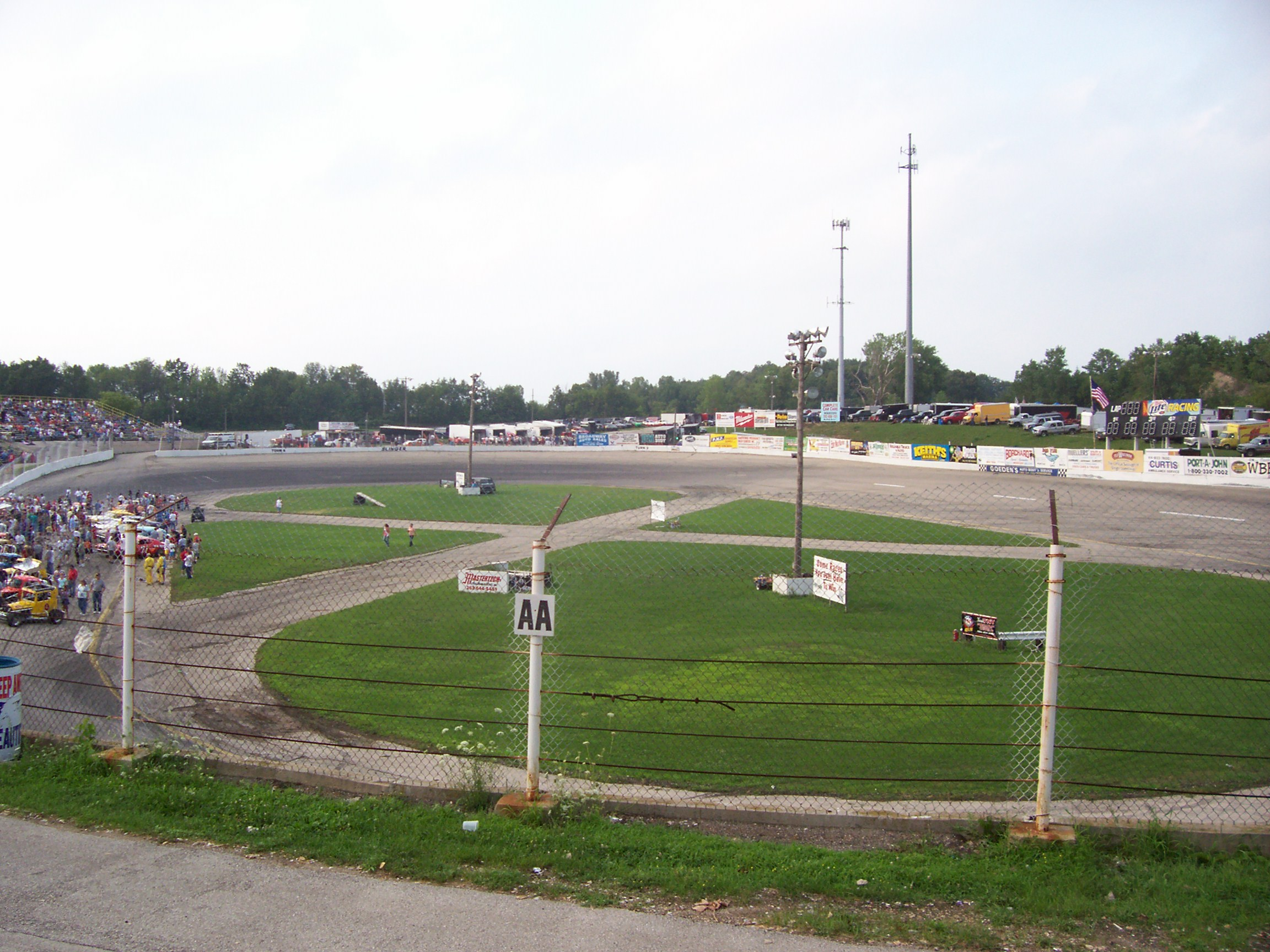
Slinger Speedway, August 2006

- Little Switzerland Ski area is in Slinger.
- Slinger is home to the Slinger Speedway, the world's fastest quarter-mile paved oval.
- Slinger contains the 1.14 acre Slinger splash pad.

== Education ==
Slinger is served by the Slinger School District. Schools include Slinger Elementary School, Allenton Elementary, Addison Elementary, Slinger Middle School, and Slinger High School. Slinger is also home to St. Peter Catholic School, which provides private elementary education.

== See also ==
- List of villages in Wisconsin
