= Andrew Lee (magician) =

Malaysian magician

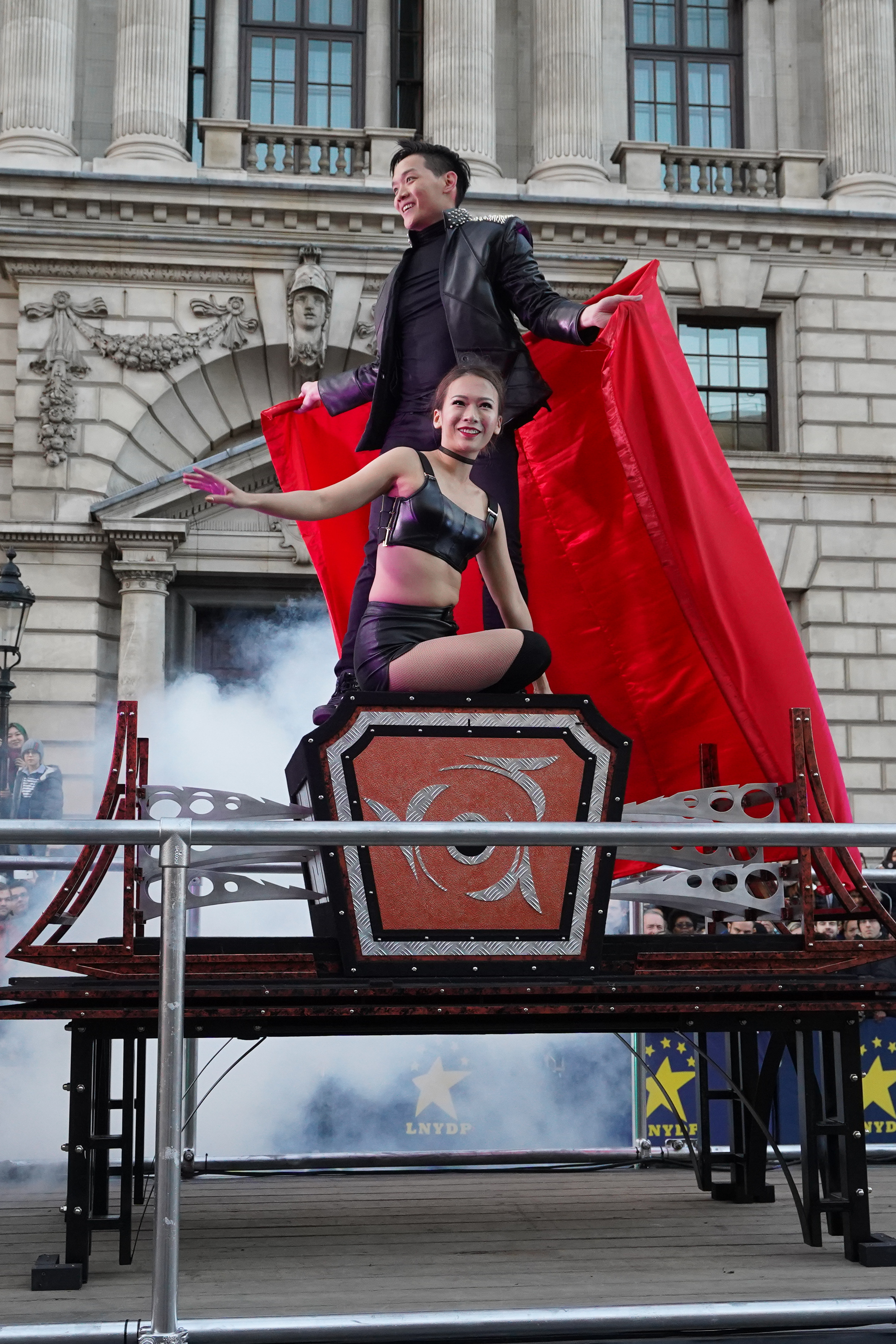
- Lee performing in the 2019 London's New Year's Day Parade
- Born: March 21, 1986 (age 39); Malaysia
- Occupations: Magician and mentalist

Andrew Lee (born March 21, 1986) is a Malaysian magician, mentalist, and illusionist. He has performed for cruise liners and various events worldwide.

Lee was the semi-finalist of Asia's Got Talent's second season, and he made headlines over his Britain's Got Talent audition in 2018.

== Early life and education ==
Lee was born on March 21, 1986, in Malaysia. He completed his Bachelor of Science degree in nutritional medicine from the Global Institute for Alternative Medicine in California.

== Career ==
He began his career as a nutritionist and worked for a fitness chain in Malaysia before becoming interested in magic and illusion tricks.

In 2015, Lee was voted to be the number one magician in Malaysia according to Tally Press Magazine, and also became the semi-finalist of Asia's Got Talent's second season. Then in 2018, he made headlines over his Britain's Got Talent (BGT) audition. He also became well known for his knife-wielding skills that impressed BGT judges and received three yeses from them. Lee was featured in the local and international press, including LADbible, OK!, NST, The Sun, BBC, and The Star.

Then, in the following year, Lee performed in front of 650,000 people through his performance at London New Year's Day Parade (LNYDP) and was the first Malaysian magician to perform at LNYDP.

In January 2022, he made his first appearance on American television with a blindfolded knife-throwing trick, on the second season of the Go-Big Show.

Lee also performs for international cruise liners, including Royal Caribbean International, Princess Cruises, Viking Cruises, and Cunard Line, and has performed in several countries. In addition, he also entertains the audience at various events worldwide.
