= Andrew Lees (vaccinologist) =

American vaccine chemist (born 1953)

- Born: February 1953 (age 73); Massachusetts, United States
- Education: Harvey Mudd College, Johns Hopkins University
- Occupation: Vaccine chemist
- Known for: Developing the CDAP conjugation method
- Medical career
- Profession: Vaccinologist
- Field: Biochemistry
- Institutions: Fina Biosolutions

Andrew Lees (born February 1953 in Massachusetts, United States) is an American vaccine chemist known for developing the CDAP conjugation method], used in vaccines manufactured by GlaxoSmithKline (Streptococcus pneumoniae, Neisseria meningitidis ) and conjugate vaccines currently in clinical development by the Serum Institute of India and Chengdu Institute of Biological Products. Lees holds 25 patents in the area of conjugate vaccines.

== Early life and education ==
Andrew Lees is the son of two scientists, Marjorie and Sidney Lees. He was born and raised in Newton, MA, except for four years in Hanover, NH.

Lees graduated from Newton North High School in 1971. He received his Bachelor of Science in Chemistry from Harvey Mudd College in 1976. After receiving his undergraduate degree Lees attended Johns Hopkins University and completed his Ph.D. in biophysics in 1984.

== Career ==
Lees was a postdoctoral fellow (1985–1988) in the laboratory of Howard Dintzis. The work centered on the Immunon model of the immune cell signaling around the synthesis of multivalent peptide constructs. He subsequently moved to the Uniformed Services University of the Health Sciences (Bethesda, MD) as a Research Instructor under Fred Finkelman and James J. Mond, although Lees’ laboratory work was in the National Institutes of Health Laboratory of Immunology headed by William E. Paul. There, under the guidance of John Inman, Lees learned bioconjugation, the linking together of biologically relevant molecules to increase their utility. In 1992, Lees set up his own lab at the Uniformed Services University and it was there that he developed the CDAP chemistry for use in conjugate vaccines. The chemistry was licensed to GlaxoSmithKline through the Henry M. Jackson Foundation. From 1993 to 1999, Lees was also part-time at Virion Systems, Inc. (Rockville, MD). Lees was appointed associate research professor (Department of Medicine) at USUHS in 1998, and the School cited his work in vaccines in his Meritorious Service Award (1999). From 1999 to 2006 Lees was director of macromolecular sciences at Biosynexus, Inc.

Lees started the biotech company Fina Biosolutions LLC in 2006, where he currently serves as the CEO and chief scientific officer. He was appointed an associate professor of medicine at the University of Maryland School of Medicine Center for Vaccine Development in 2010. He also teaches biochromatography at the University of Maryland.

== Awards ==
- 2015 - “Outstanding Alumni” award, Harvey Mudd College.

== Personal life ==
Kees lives in Silver Spring, MD, and is married to Julie Pierson Lees. They have two children.

== Selected publications ==
- Lees, A., B.L. Nelson, and J.J. Mond. Activation of soluble polysaccharides with 1-cyano-4-dimethylaminopyridinium tetrafluoroborate for use in protein-polysaccharide conjugate vaccines and immunological reagents. Vaccine 14:190, 1995
- Shafer, D.E., B. Toll, R.F. Schuman, B.L. Nelson, J.J. Mond and A. Lees. Activation of soluble polysaccharides with CDAP for use in protein-polysaccharide conjugate vaccines and immunological reagents. II. Selective crosslinking of proteins to CDAP-activated polysaccharides. Vaccine. 18:1273, 2000.
- Shafer, D. E, J. K. Inman, and A. Lees. Reaction of tris(2-carboxyethyl)phosphine (TCEP) with maleimide and -haloacyl groups: Anomalous elution of TCEP by gel filtration. Anal. Biochem. 282:161, 2000.
- Lopez-Acosta, A., G. Sen and A. Lees. Versatile and efficient synthesis of protein–polysaccharide conjugate vaccines using aminooxy reagents and oxime chemistry. Vaccine, 24:716, 2006.
- Lees, A., V. Puvanesarajah and C.E. Frasch. Conjugation Chemistry. Pps 163-174 Pneumocococcal Vaccines: The Impact of Conjugate Vaccines. Eds G.R. Siber, K.P. Klugman and P.H. Makela. ASM Press, Washington DC. 2008
