= Addison, Wisconsin =

Town in Washington County, Wisconsin

- Town
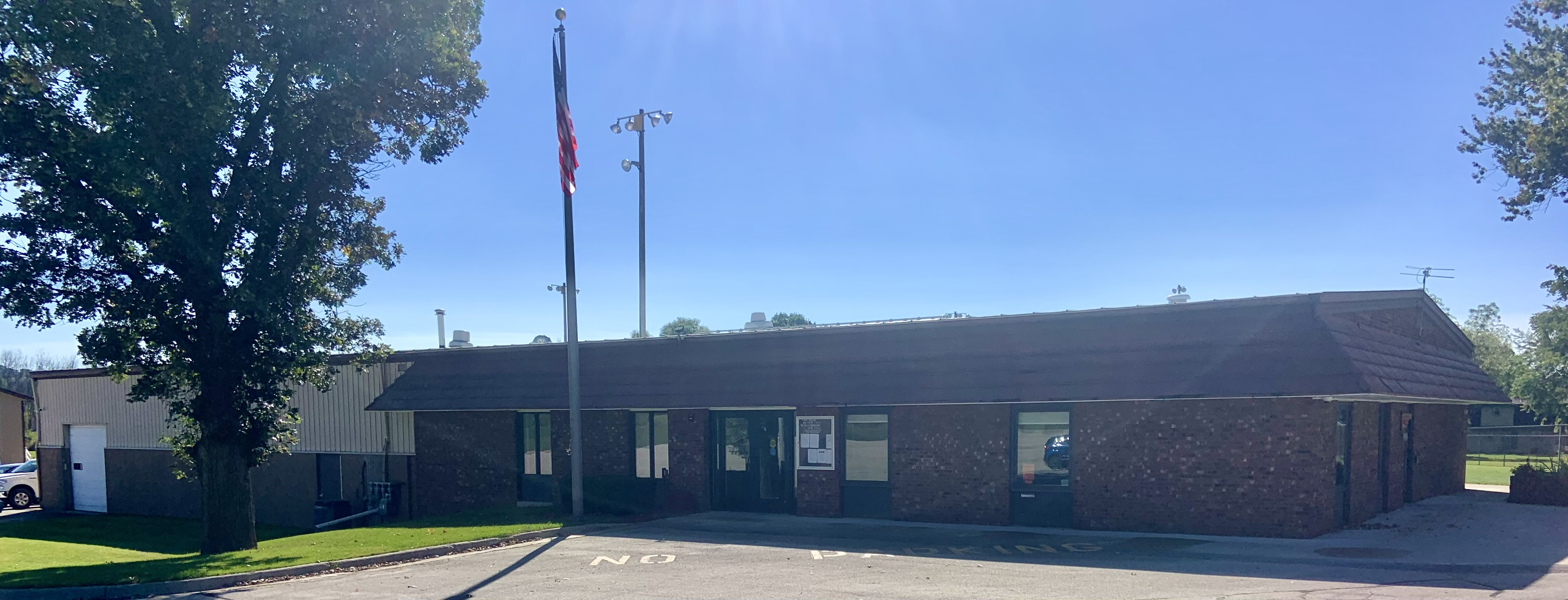
- Addison Town Hall in Allenton

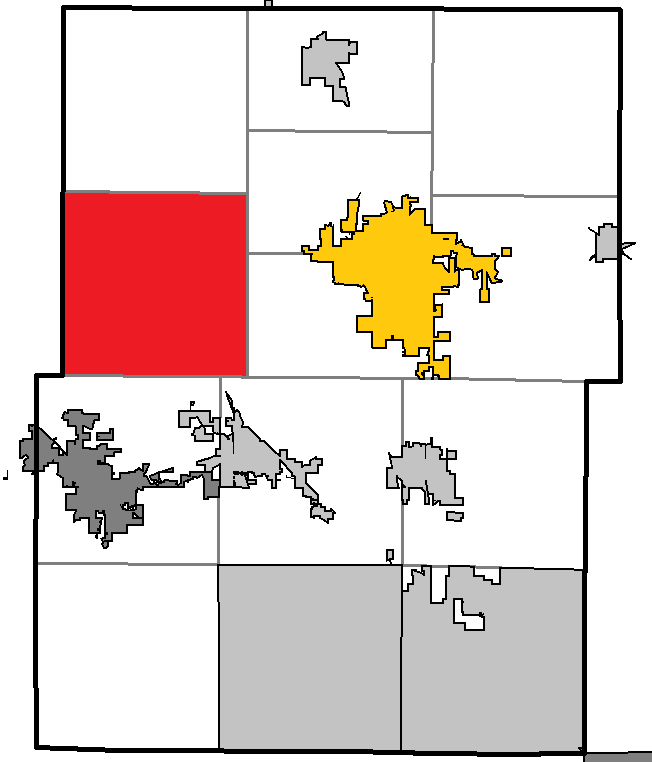
- Location of Addison, within Washington County
- Coordinates: 43°24′47″N 88°20′46″W
- Country: United States
- State: Wisconsin
- County: Washington

Area
  - Total: 36.2 sq mi (93.7 km^{2})
  - Land: 36.2 sq mi (93.7 km^{2})
  - Water: 0 sq mi (0.0 km^{2})
- Elevation: 948 ft (289 m)

Population (2020)
  - Total: 3,464
  - Density: 95.7/sq mi (37.0/km^{2})
- Time zone: UTC-6 (Central (CST))
  - Summer (DST): UTC-5 (CDT)
- Area code: 262
- FIPS code: 55-00425
- GNIS feature ID: 1582657
- Website: addisonwi.gov

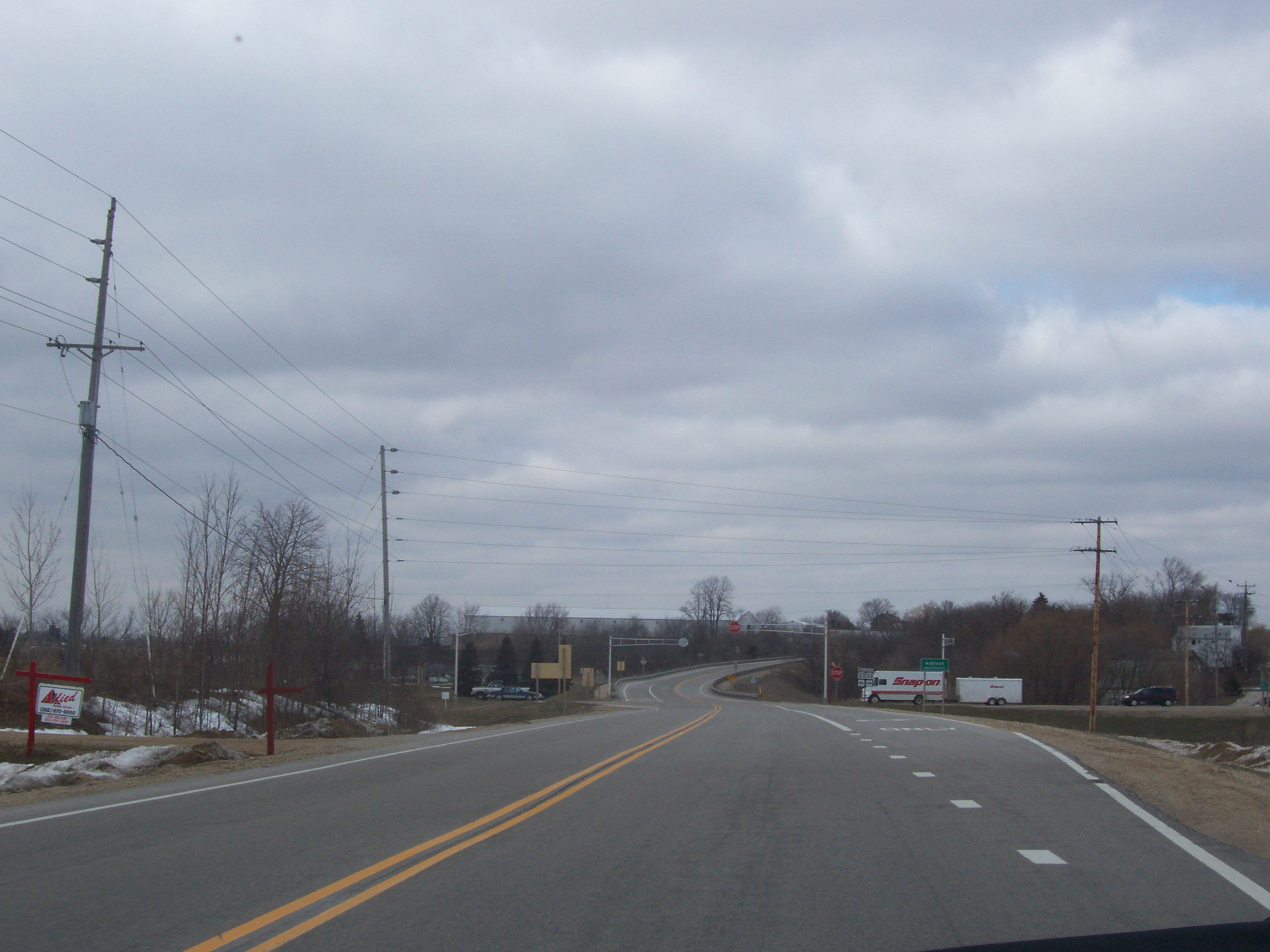
Unincorporated community of Addison in the town of Addison

Addison is a town in Washington County, Wisconsin, United States. The population was 3,464 at the 2020 census. The unincorporated communities of Addison, Allenton, Aurora, Nenno, and Saint Anthony are located with the town. The unincorporated community of Saint Lawrence is also located partially in the town.

== History ==
In the early 19th century when the first white settlers arrived in Southeastern Wisconsin, the Potawatomi and Menominee Native Americans inhabited the land now occupied by the Town of Addison. In 1831, the Menominee surrendered their claims to the land to the United States Federal Government through the Treaty of Washington. The Potawatomi surrendered their land claims in 1833 through the 1833 Treaty of Chicago, which (after being ratified in 1835) required them to leave the area by 1838. While many Native people moved west of the Mississippi River to Kansas, some chose to remain, and were referred to as "strolling Potawatomi" in contemporary documents because many of them were migrants who subsisted by squatting on their ancestral lands, which were now owned by white settlers. Eventually the Potawatomi who evaded forced removal gathered in northern Wisconsin, where they formed the Forest County Potawatomi Community.

The first white settlers were farmers who arrived in 1843 and 1844. The Town of Addison incorporated on January 21, 1846. At the time, it included the land that would become the Town of Wayne, which was partitioned from Addison on March 11, 1848. Many of the early settlers were German immigrants who operated crop and dairy farms.

Several small unincorporated hamlets formed in Addison, the largest of which is Allenton. Located on the east branch of the Rock River, the community formed in 1882 around a depot of the Wisconsin Central Railroad. In its early years, the hamlet provided a market for farmers to sell their produce, a bank, and a sawmill.

== Geography ==
According to the United States Census Bureau, the town has a total area of 36.2 square miles (93.7 km^{2}), all land.

== Demographics ==
As of the census of 2000, there were 3,341 people, 1,149 households, and 928 families residing in the town. The population density was 92.4 people per square mile (35.7/km^{2}). There were 1,181 housing units at an average density of 32.6 per square mile (12.6/km^{2}). The racial makeup of the town was 99.28% White, 0.15% African American, 0.21% Native American, 0.03% Asian, 0.03% Pacific Islander, 0.03% from other races, and 0.27% from two or more races. Hispanic or Latino of any race were 0.96% of the population.

There were 1,149 households, out of which 41.2% had children under the age of 18 living with them, 71.6% were married couples living together, 5.7% had a female householder with no husband present, and 19.2% were non-families. 14.5% of all households were made up of individuals, and 5.2% had someone living alone who was 65 years of age or older. The average household size was 2.90 and the average family size was 3.25.

In the town, the population was spread out, with 28.9% under the age of 18, 7.0% from 18 to 24, 33.3% from 25 to 44, 22.5% from 45 to 64, and 8.4% who were 65 years of age or older. The median age was 36 years. For every 100 females, there were 107.4 males. For every 100 females age 18 and over, there were 106.7 males.

The median income for a household in the town was $56,875, and the median income for a family was $64,034. Males had a median income of $38,641 versus $25,203 for females. The per capita income for the town was $20,999. About 3.0% of families and 4.5% of the population were below the poverty line, including 5.1% of those under age 18 and 8.9% of those age 65 or over.

== Education ==
Addison Public Schools are part of the Slinger School District. Schools in the district include Addison Elementary, Allenton Elementary, Slinger Elementary, Slinger Middle School and Slinger High School.

== Sources ==
- Quickert, Carl (1912). Washington County, Wisconsin: Past and Present. Chicago, IL: S. J. Clarke Publishing Company.
