= Suburban Classic Hockey Conference =

Wisconsin high school hockey conference (1995-2000)

The Suburban Classic Hockey Conference is a former high school hockey conference with its membership footprint in the Milwaukee metropolitan area. Formed in 1995 and competing for five seasons, most of the conference's member schools were affiliated with the Wisconsin Interscholastic Athletic Association.

== History ==
Location of Original Suburban Classic Hockey Conference Members

During the 1990s, hockey experienced sustained growth as an interscholastic sport in southeastern Wisconsin. The Suburban Classic Conference was formed in 1995 by nine schools in the Milwaukee area to facilitate scheduling and build continued interest in the sport. Six of the original members were located in Waukesha County (Arrowhead, Brookfield, Kettle Moraine, Oconomowoc, St. John's Northwestern and Waukesha), and three programs in Milwaukee (Wauwatosa and Whitefish Bay) and Sheboygan (Sheboygan) Counties rounded out the initial roster. After the first two seasons of competition, the newly created hockey program at Homestead High School in Mequon became members in 1997, and the Suburban Classic was split into two five-team divisions:

Eastern Division	Western Division
Brookfield	Arrowhead
Homestead	Kettle Moraine
Sheboygan	Oconomowoc
Wauwatosa	St. John's Northwestern
Whitefish Bay	Waukesha

Location of Final Suburban Classic Hockey Conference Members

This alignment would remain in place for two years before the conference expanded again in 1999. The Suburban Classic accepted three private schools into the conference (Catholic Memorial, Marquette University and Pius XI) after the collapse of the Independent High School Hockey League after the 1998-99 school year. Divisions were also scrapped for what would turn out to be the conference's final season. In 2000, two all-sport conferences in southeastern Wisconsin added boys hockey to their list of athletic offerings: the Classic 8 and Greater Metro. Eleven programs were affected by this development, with six going to the Classic 8 (Arrowhead, Catholic Memorial, Kettle Moraine/Mukwonago, Oconomowoc, Pius XI and Waukesha) and five joining the Greater Metro (Brookfield, Homestead, Marquette University, Wauwatosa and Whitefish Bay). Sheboygan joined the Badgerland Hockey Conference after the breakup of the Suburban Classic, while St. John's Northwestern became an independent before joining a co-operative with Oconomowoc and Pewaukee a few years later.

== Conference membership history ==
School/Program	Location	Affiliation	Mascot	Colors	Joined	Left	Primary Conference
Arrowhead	Hartland, WI	Public	Warhawks		1995	2000	Classic 8
Brookfield (Note: Co-operative between Brookfield Central and Brookfield East)	Brookfield, WI	Public	Stars		1995	2000	Greater Metro
Catholic Memorial	Waukesha, WI	Private (Catholic)	Crusaders		1999	2000	Classic 8
Homestead	Mequon, WI	Public	Highlanders		1997	2000	North Shore
Kettle Moraine (Note: Co-operative with Mukwonago (1999-2000))	Wales, WI	Public	Lasers		1995	2000	Classic 8
Marquette University	Milwaukee, WI	Private (Catholic)	Hilltoppers		1999	2000	Greater Metro
Oconomowoc	Oconomowoc, WI	Public	Raccoons		1995	2000	Wisconsin Little Ten
Pius XI	Milwaukee, WI	Private (Catholic)	Popes		1999	2000	Classic 8
Sheboygan (Note: Co-operative between Sheboygan North and Sheboygan South)	Sheboygan, WI	Public	Red Raiders		1995	2000	Fox River Valley
St. John's Northwestern	Delafield, WI	Private (Nonsectarian), Military	Lancers		1995	2000	Midwest Classic
Waukesha (Note: Co-operative between Waukesha North, Waukesha South and Waukesha West)	Waukesha, WI	Public	Wings		1995	2000	Classic 8
Wauwatosa (Note: Co-operative between Wauwatosa East and Wauwatosa West)	Wauwatosa, WI	Public	None		1995	2000	Woodland, Greater Metro
Whitefish Bay (Note: Co-operative with Shorewood (1996-2000) and Nicolet (1998-2000))	Whitefish Bay, WI	Public	Blue Dukes		1995	2000	North Shore

== Membership timeline ==
Eastern Division Western Division

== List of conference champions ==
School	Quantity	Years
Brookfield	4	1996, 1997, 1998, 1999
Sheboygan	1	2000
Arrowhead	0	
Catholic Memorial	0	
Homestead	0	
Kettle Moraine	0	
Kettle Moraine/ Mukwonago	0	
Marquette University	0	
Oconomowoc	0	
Pius XI	0	
St. John's Northwestern	0	
Waukesha	0	
Wauwatosa	0	
Whitefish Bay	0	
Whitefish Bay/ Nicolet/ Shorewood	0	
Whitefish Bay/ Shorewood	0	
