= Waukesha =

Waukesha may refer to:

== Places ==
United States

- Waukesha County, Wisconsin
  - Waukesha County Airport
- Waukesha, Wisconsin, a city and the county seat of Waukesha County
- Waukesha (village), Wisconsin, a village in Waukesha County
- Waukesha Dolomite, Waukesha County, Wisconsin, USA; a geologic formation
- Waukesha Subdivision, Wisconsin, USA; a railroad division

== Education ==
- University of Wisconsin–Waukesha, Waukesha County, Wisconsin, USA
- Waukesha County Technical College, Waukesha County, Wisconsin, USA
- Waukesha School District, Waukesha County, Wisconsin, USA
  - Waukesha North High School
  - Waukesha South High School
  - Waukesha West High School

== Businesses and organizations ==
- Waukesha Engines, stationary engine brand
- Waukesha Bearings Corporation
- Milwaukee and Waukesha Railroad

== Other uses ==
- Waukesha Biota in the Lagerstätte of the Silurian from Waukesha Dolomite
- USS Waukesha, a U.S. Navy shipname
  - USS Waukesha (AKA-84), a WWII U.S.Navy Tolland-class attack cargo ship
- Waukesha Christmas parade attack (2021), a vehicle-ramming attack targeting a Christmas parade

== See also ==
- Waukesha County (disambiguation)
- Waukesha High School (disambiguation)
- Waukesha attack (disambiguation)
- "Wockesha", a similarly-titled song by rapper Moneybagg Yo
