= Classic 8 Conference =

Wisconsin high school athletic conference

- Association: WIAA
- Founded: 1997
- Commissioner: Dave Sternig
- Sports fielded: 15; men's: 15; women's: 14
- Division: Divisions 1-2
- No. of teams: 8 (see list)
- Headquarters: Waukesha, Wisconsin
- Region: Southeast Wisconsin: Waukesha County; Milwaukee County
- Website: Classic8Conference.org

The Classic 8 Conference is a high school athletic conference with its membership base in southeastern Wisconsin. Founded in 1997, the conference and its member schools belong to the Wisconsin Interscholastic Athletic Association.

== History ==
The Classic 8 Conference was formed in 1997 by eight large high schools in the western suburbs of the Milwaukee metropolitan area. The six public school members of the new conference were previously members of the Southeast Conference (Arrowhead, Kettle Moraine, Mukwonago, Waukesha North, Waukesha South and Waukesha West). Two private Catholic high schools that were formerly in the Metro Conference (Catholic Memorial in Waukesha and Pius XI in Milwaukee) joined the conference in conjunction with the coming merger between the WIAA and their previous parent organization, the Wisconsin Independent Schools Athletic Association. The original lineup remained intact for the first fifteen years of competition. In 2012, Pius XI, which was the smallest school in the conference, left the Classic 8 to join the Woodland Conference and compete with schools that were closer in size. They were replaced by Muskego, who joined the Classic 8 from the Southeast Conference after the new Indian Trail High School opened on the west side of Kenosha. The Classic 8 absorbed a ninth member in 2017 when Oconomowoc joined from the shuttered Wisconsin Little Ten Conference. In 2020, Catholic Memorial left the Classic 8 as a football member due to difference in competition level with the conference's public high schools, joining the football-only Parkland Conference for that sport. The Classic 8 has returned to an eight-member roster for the 2025–26 school year with Waukesha North and Waukesha South both joining the Woodland Conference and Oak Creek moving over from the Southeast Conference. In April 2026, the WIAA Board of Controls finalized their realignment package for the 2027-28 school year, granting Oak Creek's request to shift to the Greater Metro Conference, exchanging affiliations with current GMC members Sussex Hamilton.

=== Football-only alignment ===
In February 2019, in conjunction with the Wisconsin Football Coaches Association, the WIAA released a sweeping football-only realignment for Wisconsin to commence with the 2020 football season and run on a two-year cycle. Most of the Classic 8 remained intact for football, with the exception of Catholic Memorial shifting to the new football-only Parkland Conference to create an eight-member loop. This alignment stayed intact through the 2022-2023 cycle. In 2024, the Classic 8 experienced a net loss of one member, with Waukesha North and Waukesha South moving over to the Parkland Conference, with Pewaukee swapping affiliations to make a seven-member conference. The Classic 8 also entered into a scheduling alliance with the Greater Metro Conference where there would be one mandatory crossover game per school that would count towards the conference standings. For the 2026-2027 realignment cycle, the Classic 8 will be losing Pewaukee and Waukesha West to the North Shore Conference. These two schools are currently slated to be replaced Franklin of the Southeast Conference, and the schedule crossover became a double crossover with two GMC opponents being scheduled for conference play per season.

== List of member schools ==
=== Current full members ===
School	Location	Affiliation	Enrollment	Mascot	Colors	Joined
Arrowhead	Hartland, WI	Public	1,862	Warhawks		1997
Catholic Memorial	Waukesha, WI	Private (Catholic)	617	Crusaders		1997
Kettle Moraine	Wales, WI	Public	1,285	Lasers		1997
Mukwonago	Mukwonago, WI	Public	1,536	Indians		1997
Muskego	Muskego, WI	Public	1,621	Warriors		2012
Oak Creek (Note: Joining the Greater Metro Conference for the 2026-27 school year)	Oak Creek, WI	Public	2,118	Knights		2025
Oconomowoc	Oconomowoc, WI	Public	1,573	Raccoons		2017
Waukesha West	Waukesha, WI	Public	1,158	Wolverines		1997

=== Current associate members ===
School	Location	Affiliation	Mascot	Colors	Primary Conference	Sport(s)
Cedarburg	Cedarburg, WI	Public	Bulldogs		North Shore	Boys Hockey
Franklin	Franklin, WI	Public	Sabers		Southeast	Football
Homestead	Mequon, WI	Public	Highlanders		North Shore	Boys Hockey
Marquette University	Milwaukee, WI	Public	Hilltoppers		Greater Metro	Boys Hockey

=== Current co-operative members ===
Team	Colors	Host School	Co-operative Members	Sport(s)
Brookfield Stars		Brookfield East	Brookfield Central, Hamilton, Menomonee Falls, Wauwatosa East, Wauwatosa West	Boys Hockey
Kenosha Thunder		Kenosha Bradford	Kenosha Indian Trail, Kenosha Tremper, Westosha Central, Wilmot Union	Boys Hockey
KMMO Hockey		Kettle Moraine	Mukwonago, Oconomowoc	Boys Hockey
Muskego Ice Force		Muskego	Burlington, Franklin, Greendale, Greenfield, Milwaukee Reagan Prep, Nathan Hale, New Berllin Eisenhower, New Berlin West, Oak Creek, St. Francis, Union Grove, Waterford, West Allis Central, Whitnall	Boys Hockey
Waukesha Gymnastics		Waukesha West	Waukesha North, Waukesha South, Catholic Memorial	Gymnastics (Note: Co-sponsored with Southeast Conference)
Waukesha Nighthawks		Waukesha West	Waukesha North, Waukesha South, Catholic Memorial (girls only)	Boys Lacrosse, Girls Lacrosse
Waukesha Wings		Waukesha North	Brookfield Academy, Catholic Memorial, Lake Country Lutheran, Pewaukee, St. John's Northwestern, Waukesha South, Waukesha West	Boys Hockey
West Bend Ice Bears		West Bend West	Germantown, Hartford Union, Kettle Moraine Lutheran, Kewaskum, Living Word Lutheran, Slinger, West Bend East	Boys Hockey
WNS Storm		Whitefish Bay	Nicolet, Shorewood, Dominican, Martin Luther, Milwaukee Rufus King, St. Thomas More	Boys Hockey

=== Future full members ===
School	Location	Affiliation	Enrollment	Mascot	Colors	Joining	Former Conference
Hamilton	Sussex, WI	Public	1,513	Chargers		2027	Greater Metro

=== Former full members ===
School	Location	Affiliation	Mascot	Colors	Joined	Left	Conference Joined	Current Conference
Pius XI	Milwaukee, WI	Private (Catholic)	Popes		1997	2012	Woodland	Parkland (2026)
Waukesha North	Waukesha, WI	Public	Northstars		1997	2025	Woodland	Parkland (2026)
Waukesha South	Waukesha, WI	Public	Blackshirts		1997	2025	Woodland	Parkland (2026)

=== Former associate members ===
School	Location	Affiliation	Mascot	Colors	Joined	Left	Primary Conference	Sport
Oconomowoc	Oconomowoc, WI	Public	Raccoons		2000	2002	Wisconsin Little Ten	Boys Hockey
Pewaukee	Pewaukee, WI	Public	Pirates		2024	2025	Park Ridge	Football
St. John's Northwestern	Delafield, WI	Private (Nonsectarian, Military)	Lancers		2010	2012	Midwest Classic	Boys Hockey
University School	River Hills, WI	Private (Nonsectarian)	Wildcats		2013	2023	Midwest Classic	Boys Hockey

=== Former co-operative members ===
Team	Colors	Host School	Co-operative Members	Joined	Left	Sport
Lakers Hockey		Oconomowoc	Pewaukee, St. John's Northwestern	2002	2010	Boys Hockey

== Membership map ==
Classic 8 Conference
Location of Classic 8 Conference full members:
1 Arrowhead
2 Catholic Memorial
3 Kettle Moraine
4 Mukwonago
5 Muskego
6 Oak Creek
7 Oconomowoc
8 Waukesha West

== Sponsored sports ==
	Baseball	Boys Basketball	Girls Basketball	Boys Cross Country	Girls Cross Country	Football	Boys Golf	Girls Golf	Gymnastics (Note: Co-sponsored with Southeast Conference)	Boys Hockey	Boys Lacrosse	Girls Lacrosse	Boys Soccer	Girls Soccer	Softball	Girls Swim & Dive	Boys Tennis	Girls Tennis	Boys Track & Field	Girls Track & Field	Boys Volleyball	Girls Volleyball	Boys Wrestling	Girls Wrestling
Arrowhead	●	●	●	●	●	●	●	●	●	●	●	●	●	●	●	●	●	●	●	●	●	●	●	●
Catholic Memorial	●	●	●	●	●		●	●			●		●	●	●		●	●	●	●	●	●	●	●
Kettle Moraine	●	●	●	●	●	●	●	●		● (Note: KMMO Hockey co-operative)	● (Note: Co-operative with St. John's Northwestern Military Academy)	●	●	●	●		●	●	●	●	●	●	●	●
Mukwonago	●	●	●	●	●	●	●	●	● (Note: Co-operative with Kettle Moraine)		● (Note: Co-operative with East Troy, New Berlin Eisenhower and New Berlin West)	● (Note: Co-operative with Big Foot, East Troy, Elkhorn, New Berlin Eisenhower, New Berlin West and Union Grove)	●	●	●		●	●	●	●	●	●	●	●
Muskego	●	●	●	●	●	●	●	●		● (Note: Muskego Ice Force co-operative)	●	●	●	●	●	●	●	●	●	●	●	●	●	●
Oak Creek	●	●	●	●	●		●	●	● (Note: Co-operative with Whitnall)				●	●	●	●	●	●	●	●	●	●	●	●
Oconomowoc	●	●	●	●	●	●	●	●	●		● (Note: Co-operative with Pewaukee)	●	●	●	●		●	●	●	●	●	●	●	●
Waukesha West	●	●	●	●	●		●		● (Note: Waukesha Gymnastics co-operative)				●	●	●	● (Note: Co-operative with Catholic Memorial)	●	●	●	●	●	●	●	●

== List of state champions ==
=== Fall sports ===
Boys Cross Country
School	Year	Division
Catholic Memorial	1999	Division 1 (WISAA)
Waukesha West	1999	Division 1
Catholic Memorial	2002	Division 1
Arrowhead	2010	Division 1
Arrowhead	2011	Division 1
Oconomowoc	2020	Division 1

Girls Cross Country
School	Year	Division
Catholic Memorial	1997	Division 1 (WISAA)
Catholic Memorial	1998	Division 1 (WISAA)
Waukesha West	1998	Division 1
Catholic Memorial	1999	Division 1 (WISAA)
Waukesha West	1999	Division 1
Waukesha West	2000	Division 1
Waukesha West	2001	Division 1
Waukesha West	2004	Division 1
Waukesha West	2005	Division 1
Arrowhead	2007	Division 1
Arrowhead	2011	Division 1
Arrowhead	2012	Division 1
Arrowhead	2013	Division 1
Muskego	2018	Division 1
Muskego	2019	Division 1
Muskego	2022	Division 1

Football
School	Year	Division
Mukwonago	2004	Division 1
Waukesha West	2004	Division 2
Arrowhead	2007	Division 1
Waukesha West	2010	Division 1
Arrowhead	2012	Division 1
Catholic Memorial	2012	Division 3
Arrowhead	2013	Division 1
Catholic Memorial	2016	Division 3
Catholic Memorial	2018	Division 3
Muskego	2018	Division 1
Catholic Memorial	2019	Division 3
Muskego	2019	Division 1
Kettle Moraine	2022	Division 2
Arrowhead	2025	Division 1

Girls Golf
School	Year	Division
Arrowhead	2004	Division 1
Arrowhead	2013	Division 1
Arrowhead	2016	Division 1
Arrowhead	2017	Division 1
Kettle Moraine	2018	Division 1

Boys Soccer
School	Year	Division
Catholic Memorial	2010	Division 2
Muskego	2013	Division 1
Waukesha West	2024	Division 2

Girls Swimming & Diving
School	Year	Division
Arrowhead	2002	Division 1
Arrowhead	2003	Division 1
Arrowhead	2004	Division 1
Arrowhead	2005	Division 1
Arrowhead	2006	Division 1
Arrowhead	2008	Division 1
Arrowhead	2009	Division 1
Arrowhead	2010	Division 1
Mukwonago/ Waukesha South	2011	Division 1
Mukwonago/ Waukesha South	2012	Division 1
Mukwonago/ Waukesha South	2013	Division 1
Arrowhead	2014	Division 1
Arrowhead	2015	Division 1
Arrowhead	2022	Division 1

Girls Tennis
School	Year	Division
Arrowhead	2014	Division 1
Catholic Memorial	2019	Division 2
Muskego	2020	Division 1
Catholic Memorial	2021	Division 2
Arrowhead	2022	Division 1
Arrowhead	2023	Division 1

Boys Volleyball
School	Year
Catholic Memorial	2000
Pius XI	2001
Catholic Memorial	2010
Catholic Memorial	2016
Kettle Moraine	2020
Kettle Moraine	2022

Girls Volleyball
School	Year	Division
Catholic Memorial	1997	Division 1 (WISAA)
Catholic Memorial	1998	Division 1 (WISAA)
Pius XI	2002	Division 1
Catholic Memorial	2006	Division 2
Catholic Memorial	2009	Division 2
Catholic Memorial	2010	Division 2
Catholic Memorial	2011	Division 2
Catholic Memorial	2014	Division 2
Catholic Memorial	2015	Division 2
Catholic Memorial	2016	Division 2
Arrowhead	2019	Division 1
Oconomowoc	2021	Division 1
Catholic Memorial	2024	Division 2

=== Winter sports ===
Boys Basketball
School	Year	Division
Pius XI	2000	Division 1 (WISAA)
Catholic Memorial	2004	Division 2
Arrowhead	2010	Division 1
Catholic Memorial	2010	Division 2

Girls Basketball
School	Year	Division
Pius XI	1998	Division 1 (WISAA)
Kettle Moraine	1999	Division 1
Pius XI	1999	Division 1 (WISAA)
Pius XI	2000	Division 1 (WISAA)
Pius XI	2010	Division 1
Kettle Moraine	2022	Division 1
Kettle Moraine	2023	Division 1
Arrowhead	2024	Division 1
Arrowhead	2026	Division 1

Gymnastics
School	Year	Division
Arrowhead	2026	Division 1

Boys Hockey
School	Year
Arrowhead	2009
University School	2019

Boys Swimming & Diving
School	Year	Division
Arrowhead	2002	Division 1
Arrowhead	2003	Division 1
Arrowhead	2004	Division 1
Arrowhead	2008	Division 1
Catholic Memorial/ Waukesha South	2010	Division 1
Catholic Memorial/ Waukesha South	2017	Division 1

Boys Wrestling
School	Year	Organization
Catholic Memorial	1998	WISAA

=== Spring sports ===
Boys Golf
School	Year	Division
Arrowhead	2001	Division 1
Arrowhead	2007	Division 1
Arrowhead	2008	Division 1
Arrowhead	2009	Division 1
Arrowhead	2010	Division 1
Arrowhead	2012	Division 1
Arrowhead	2015	Division 1
Arrowhead	2017	Division 1
Arrowhead	2021	Division 1

Girls Lacrosse
School	Year
Kettle Moraine/ Badger	2024

Girls Soccer
School	Year	Division
Arrowhead	1998	Division 1
Catholic Memorial	1999	Division 1 (WISAA)
Catholic Memorial	2000	Division 1 (WISAA)
Pius XI	2001	Division 1
Catholic Memorial	2004	Division 2
Catholic Memorial	2006	Division 2
Catholic Memorial	2007	Division 2
Catholic Memorial	2010	Division 2
Catholic Memorial	2012	Division 2
Catholic Memorial	2013	Division 2
Catholic Memorial	2014	Division 3
Catholic Memorial	2015	Division 3
Catholic Memorial	2016	Division 3
Catholic Memorial	2017	Division 3
Catholic Memorial	2019	Division 3
Muskego	2019	Division 1
Muskego	2022	Division 1
Muskego	2023	Division 1
Muskego	2024	Division 1

Softball
School	Year	Division
Catholic Memorial	2021	Division 2

Boys Tennis
School	Year	Division
Catholic Memorial	2021	Division 2

Boys Track & Field
School	Year	Division
Pius XI	1998	Division 1 (WISAA)
Arrowhead	2004	Division 1
Kettle Moraine	2008	Division 1
Arrowhead	2009	Division 1
Arrowhead	2021	Division 1
Arrowhead	2022	Division 1
Arrowhead	2023	Division 1
Arrowhead	2024	Division 1

Girls Track & Field
School	Year	Division
Catholic Memorial	1999	Division 1 (WISAA)
Catholic Memorial	2000	Division 1 (WISAA)
Waukesha West	2000	Division 1
Waukesha West	2004	Division 1
Waukesha West	2005	Division 1
Waukesha West	2006	Division 1
Waukesha West	2018	Division 1
Muskego	2019	Division 1
Muskego	2021	Division 1
Arrowhead	2024	Division 1
Arrowhead	2026	Division 1

=== Summer sports ===
Baseball
School	Year
Pius XI	2001
Arrowhead	2009
Muskego	2018

== List of conference champions ==
=== Boys Basketball ===
School	Quantity	Years
Arrowhead	10	2003, 2009, 2011, 2013, 2017, 2018, 2020, 2023, 2024, 2026
Pius XI	6	2000, 2002, 2005, 2006, 2007, 2012
Catholic Memorial	4	2003, 2004, 2008, 2010
Waukesha West	4	1998, 2001, 2019, 2021
Kettle Moraine	3	2014, 2018, 2025
Waukesha South	3	1999, 2006, 2022
Muskego	2	2015, 2016
Mukwonago	1	2013
Oak Creek	0	
Oconomowoc	0	
Waukesha North	0	

=== Girls Basketball ===
School	Quantity	Years
Arrowhead	11	2008, 2012, 2014, 2015, 2017, 2018, 2021, 2023, 2024, 2025, 2026
Mukwonago	8	2002, 2006, 2009, 2013, 2016, 2018, 2019, 2020
Pius XI	7	1998, 2000, 2001, 2007, 2010, 2011, 2012
Kettle Moraine	5	1999, 2003, 2016, 2021, 2022
Waukesha South	2	2004, 2005
Muskego	1	2025
Waukesha West	1	2015
Catholic Memorial	0	
Oak Creek	0	
Oconomowoc	0	
Waukesha North	0	

=== Football ===
School	Quantity	Years
Arrowhead	12	2001, 2002, 2006, 2007, 2008, 2010, 2012, 2013, 2014, 2015, 2024, 2026
Muskego	9	2014, 2015, 2018, 2019, 2020, 2021, 2022, 2025, 2026
Mukwonago	6	1999, 2003, 2004, 2005, 2021, 2022
Catholic Memorial	5	1997, 1998, 2000, 2014, 2016
Waukesha West	5	2009, 2010, 2011, 2014, 2017
Kettle Moraine	1	2023
Oconomowoc	1	2024
Pius XI	1	2006
Franklin	0	
Oak Creek	0	
Pewaukee	0	
Waukesha North	0	
Waukesha South	0	

=== Boys Hockey ===
School	Quantity	Years
Arrowhead	10	2002, 2003, 2004, 2005, 2006, 2008, 2009, 2013, 2017, 2020
Waukesha Wings	5	2010, 2015, 2017, 2018, 2022
University School	4	2014, 2016, 2019, 2021
Brookfield Stars	3	2023, 2024, 2025
KMMO Hockey	2	2012, 2013
Catholic Memorial	1	2001
Catholic Memorial/ Pius XI	1	2011
Kettle Moraine/ Mukwonago	1	2007
Muskego Ice Force	1	2026
Cedarburg	0	
Homestead	0	
Kenosha Thunder	0	
Lakers Hockey	0	
Marquette University	0	
Oconomowoc	0	
Pius XI	0	
St. John's Northwestern	0	
West Bend Bears	0	
WNS Storm	0	
