= Trey Wedig =

American football player (born 2002)

Profile
- Position: Offensive tackle

Personal information
- Born: January 10, 2002 (age 24); Oconomowoc, Wisconsin, U.S.
- Listed height: 6 ft 7 in (2.01 m)
- Listed weight: 310 lb (141 kg)

Career information
- High school: Kettle Moraine (Wales, Wisconsin)
- College: Wisconsin (2020–2023); Indiana (2024)
- NFL draft: 2025: undrafted

Career history
- Los Angeles Rams (2025)*; Arizona Cardinals (2025)*; DC Defenders (2026); Indianapolis Colts (2026)*
- * Offseason or practice squad member only
- Stats at Pro Football Reference

Trey Wedig (born January 10, 2002) is an American professional football offensive tackle. He played college football for the Wisconsin Badgers and Indiana Hoosiers.

== Early life ==
Wedig attended Kettle Moraine High School. After his senior year, he accepted an invite to participate in the All-American Bowl. Coming out of high school, Wedig was rated as a four-star recruit and committed to play college football for the Wisconsin Badgers over offers from schools such as Iowa State, Michigan, Minnesota, Nebraska, Notre Dame, Syracuse, and USC.

== College career ==
=== Wisconsin ===
After taking a redshirt in 2020, Wedig played in 12 games in 2021. In 2022, he appeared in ten games, while making eight starts. In 2023, Wedig played in all 12 games in 2023 and entered his name into the NCAA transfer portal after the season.

=== Indiana ===
Wedig transferred to play for the Indiana Hoosiers. During his one season as a Hoosier in 2024, he started in all 13 games at right tackle. After the season, Wedig declared for the 2025 NFL draft.

== Professional career ==
Pre-draft measurables
Height	Weight	Arm length	Hand span	Wingspan	40-yard dash	10-yard split	20-yard split	20-yard shuttle	Three-cone drill	Vertical jump	Broad jump	Bench press
6 ft 6 5/8 in (2.00 m)	313 lb (142 kg)	33 1/2 in (0.85 m)	10 in (0.25 m)	6 ft 10 5/8 in (2.10 m)	5.21 s	1.71 s	2.95 s	4.90 s	7.90 s	31.0 in (0.79 m)	8 ft 11 in (2.72 m)	17 reps
All values from Pro Day

=== Los Angeles Rams ===
Wedig signed with the Los Angeles Rams as an undrafted free agent on April 28, 2025. He was waived on August 24.

=== Arizona Cardinals ===
On November 19, 2025, Wedig signed with the Arizona Cardinals' practice squad. He was released on December 16.

=== DC Defenders ===
On February 7, 2026, Wedig signed with the DC Defenders of the United Football League (UFL).

=== Indianapolis Colts ===
On August 18, 2026, Wedig signed with the Indianapolis Colts. He was waived by Indianapolis on August 30.
