= Catholic Memorial =

Catholic Memorial may refer to the following schools:

- Catholic Memorial School in West Roxbury, Massachusetts, US
- Catholic Memorial High School in Waukesha, Wisconsin, US
