= Independent High School Hockey League =

Wisconsin high school hockey conference (1990-1999)

The Independent High School Hockey League is a former high school hockey conference consisting of private schools primarily in southern Wisconsin. Founded in 1990 and disbanded in 1999, most schools in the conference were affiliated with the Wisconsin Independent Schools Athletic Association.

== History ==
Location of Independent High School Hockey League members (1994-1996):

The Independent High School Hockey League was formed in 1990 by six private high schools in Wisconsin: Edgewood in Madison, Marquette University and Pius XI in Milwaukee, Notre Dame Academy in Green Bay, St. Mary's Springs in Fond du Lac and University School in River Hills. Catholic Memorial in Waukesha joined the conference the next year after promoting their hockey program to the varsity level. Lake Forest Academy in Illinois joined in 1994, giving the conference eight members for the next two years. Two schools left the IHSHL in 1996: Notre Dame (dropped interscholastic hockey) and St. Mary's Springs, giving the conference a six-member roster until it disbanded in 1999.

== Conference membership history ==
=== Final members ===
School/Program	Location	Affiliation	Mascot	Colors	Joined	Left	Primary Conference
Catholic Memorial	Waukesha, WI	Private (Catholic)	Crusaders		1991	1999	Metro, Classic 8
Edgewood	Madison, WI	Private (Catholic)	Crusaders		1990	1999	WISAA Independent
Lake Forest Academy	Lake Forest, IL	Private (Nonsectarian)	Caxys		1994	1999	Independent School (IHSA)
Marquette University	Milwaukee, WI	Private (Catholic)	Hilltoppers		1990	1999	Metro, Greater Metro
Pius XI	Milwaukee, WI	Private (Catholic)	Popes		1990	1999	Metro, Classic 8
University School	River Hills, WI	Private (Nonsectarian)	Wildcats		1990	1999	Midwest Classic

=== Former members ===
School	Location	Affiliation	Mascot	Colors	Joined	Left	Primary Conference
Notre Dame Academy	Green Bay, WI	Private (Catholic)	Tritons		1990	1996	Fox Valley Christian, Fox River Valley
St. Mary's Springs	Fond du Lac, WI	Private (Catholic)	Ledgers		1990	1996	Fox Valley Christian

== List of state champions ==
School	Year	Organization
Edgewood	1991	WISAA
University School	1992	WISAA
Edgewood	1993	WISAA
Edgewood	1994	WISAA
Edgewood	1995	WISAA

== List of conference champions ==
School	Quantity	Years
Edgewood	4	1991, 1993, 1994, 1997
University School	3	1992, 1995, 1998
Catholic Memorial	2	1996, 1998
Lake Forest Academy	1	1999
Marquette University	0	
Notre Dame Academy	0	
Pius XI	0	
St. Mary's Springs	0	
