= Waukesha High School =

Waukesha High School is the name of numerous high schools in Waukesha, Wisconsin:

- Waukesha East Alternative School, part of the Waukesha School District
- Waukesha North High School (est. 1974)
- Waukesha South High School (est. 1957)
- Waukesha West High School (est. 1993)
