= Valley-Ridge Athletic Conference =

Wisconsin high school athletic conference (1934-1935)

The Valley-Ridge Athletic Conference is a former high school athletic conference located in south central Wisconsin. It was only in operation for one school year (1934–35), and three of its four member schools belonged to the Wisconsin Interscholastic Athletic Association.

== History ==
Location of Valley-Ridge Athletic Conference Members

The Valley-Ridge Athletic Conference traces its origins back to another conference formed in 1928. The Baraboo Valley League was formed that year with four members: Cazenovia, La Valle, Lime Ridge and North Freedom. All member schools were located in Sauk County or Richland County, and most were in close proximity to the Baraboo River. The conference disbanded after only one season, when Lime Ridge agreed to join the Wisconsin River League, only to back out before the season began and compete as an independent. The four schools competed as independents for the next few years until forming the Valley-Ridge Athletic Conference in 1934. As with the previous iteration of the conference, the Valley-Ridge competed for only one season before disbanding in 1935. Three of the four member schools would join the Wisconsin River League after the conference's breakup: Lime Ridge in 1936, Cazenovia in 1938 and North Freedom in 1942.

== Conference membership history ==
School	Location	Affiliation	Mascot	Colors	Joined	Left	Conference Joined	Current Conference
Cazenovia	Cazenovia, WI	Public	Blue Devils		1928, 1934	1929, 1935	Independent	Closed in 1955 (merged into Weston)
La Valle	La Valle, WI	Public	Unknown		1928, 1934	1929, 1935	Independent	Closed, date unknown (consolidated into Reedsburg)
Lime Ridge	Lime Ridge, WI	Public	Red Raiders		1928, 1934	1929, 1935	Independent	Closed in 1955 (merged into Weston)
North Freedom	North Freedom, WI	Public	Bulldogs		1928, 1934	1929, 1935	Independent	Closed in 1945 (district split between Baraboo and Reedsburg)

== List of conference champions ==
=== Boys Basketball ===
School	Quantity	Years
La Valle	1	1935
North Freedom	1	1929
Cazenovia	0	
Lime Ridge	0	
