= Oak Creek High School =

Public secondary school in Oak Creek, Wisconsin, United States

Location
- 340 E Puetz Road; Oak Creek, Wisconsin 53154; United States; 42.88769°N 87.90755°W

Information
- Type: Public secondary
- Motto: "Striving Ever (To Be Better)"
- Established: 1961
- Dean: Justin Flasch (10-12) And Ted Lambrukos (NGC)
- Principal: Candis Mongan
- Associate principals: Martin Lataille, Lindsay Pecha, Kimberly Leannais, Kelsey Noack
- Ninth Grade Center principal: Keith Ruffolo
- Teaching staff: 123.53 (FTE)
- Grades: 9–12
- Enrollment: 2,223 (2023-2024)
- Student to teacher ratio: 18.00
- Color
- Athletics conference: Classic 8 Conference
- Mascot: Knight
- Nickname: Knights
- Rival: Franklin High School
- Website: Oak Creek High School website

Oak Creek High School is a public four-year high school located in Oak Creek, Wisconsin. It is the sole high school of the Oak Creek-Franklin Joint School District, and one of the largest public schools in the state.

== History ==
Oak Creek High School was built in 1961 at a cost of over $3 million. The school was renovated in 2001 alongside additions. In 2012 the football stadium was enlarged and fitted with synthetic turf. In 2017 the Ninth Grade Center was completed, costing $36 million. In 2021 the Oak Creek Performing Arts Education Center was completed, alongside renovated and new career and technical education facilities.

The high school was involved in a federal lawsuit, Butler v. Oak Creek-Franklin School District, 172 F.Supp.2d 1102, involving the school's athletic code. The case involved claims for violation of constitutional due process and state constitutional rights arising from suspension of a high school student.

Assistant Principal Kimberly Leannais kept her job following her 3rd OWI in 2017.

Michael Jossie, a former special education teacher and basketball coach, pleaded guilty of second degree sexual assault of a child (under 16 years of age). Jossie was caught by cleaning staff engaging in sexual activity with a female student after school.

Rachel Goodle is a former teacher at Oak Creek High School who became the subject of controversy and a police investigation regarding her inappropriate relationship with a student. The case was brought to light when the Oak Creek Police Department referred it to the Milwaukee County District Attorney's office for criminal charges. Chief David Stecker of the Oak Creek Police Department confirmed that they conducted an investigation into the alleged actions of Rachel Elizabeth Goodle and the student involved, who was a 14-year-old freshman. As a result of their investigation, the case was subsequently referred to the Milwaukee County District Attorney's office for further review. Upon questioning by the OCPD regarding the rumors of an inappropriate relationship between himself and Goodle, the student reportedly confirmed that "something did happen." This acknowledgment added weight to the ongoing investigation and the seriousness of the allegations. The criminal complaint specified that the surveillance footage provided visual evidence of what appeared to be a "close relationship" between Rachel Goodle and the student in question. Notably, the footage captured a specific incident on December 2, 2022. Rachel Goodle filed a lawsuit against the school district with the intention of preventing the release of public records pertaining to her conduct. This legal action was in response to a records request from FOX6 News, which sought access to relevant documents. The lawsuit highlighted the complexity and sensitivity surrounding the case, as both legal and ethical considerations came into play in relation to the handling of public information and the preservation of the accused's rights.

== Athletics ==
Oak Creek High School offers the following sports:

- Boys' football
- Boys' cross country
- Boys' soccer
- Boys' basketball
- Boys' hockey
- Boys' swim & dive
- Boys' wrestling
- Boys' tennis
- Boys' track and field
- Boys' golf
- Boys' volleyball
- Boys' baseball
- Girls' swimming and diving
- Girls' tennis
- Girls' cross country
- Girls' volleyball
- Girls' basketball
- Girls' hockey
- Girls' gymnastics
- Girls' track & Field
- Girls' soccer
- Girls' softball
- Pom poms
- Cheerleading

OCHS won a state championship in boys' cross country in 1978.

The 1994-1995 Pom Pon squad won The Contest of Champions in Orlando, Florida.

The 2003, 2004, and 2005 Boys Baseball Team won back-to-back-to-back Summer Season Division 1 State Championships.

The Boys Track and Field Team took second place overall in division 1 in both 2017 and 2018.

The 2013-2014 Girls Basketball Team won the title of Division 1 State Champions.

The Oak Creek Marching Knights are one of the top marching bands in the state of Wisconsin. The band won nine consecutive Class AAAA state championships from 2014 to 2023(No competition held 2020).

=== Conference affiliation history ===
- Braveland Conference (1959-1963)
- Parkland Conference (1963-1985)
- Suburban Park Conference (1985-1993)
- Southeast Conference (1993-2025)
- Classic 8 Conference (2025–present)

== Notable alumni ==
- Travis Beckum, tight end and Super Bowl champion for the New York Giants
- Brian Calhoun, NFL running back for the Detroit Lions
- John Jagler, state legislator and former WTMJ (AM) radio personality
- John Matuszak, football player 2x super bowl winner with the Oakland Raiders,and actor
- Cathy Stepp, Wisconsin State Senate
- Gary George Wetzel, soldier and Medal of Honor recipient
