= Waukesha STEM Academy =

Charter school in the American state of Wisconsin

The Waukesha S.T.E.M. Academy (WSA) is a charter school in Waukesha, Wisconsin, in the Waukesha School District. It was opened in 2009, and multi-age learning groups were introduced in 2013.

The school has two campuses: the Elementary Campus (K-5) and the Saratoga Campus (6-8) (43°00′06.0″N 88°14′26.3″W). Its emphasis is on a STEM curriculum (science, technology, engineering, and mathematics).
