= Evan Kruczynski =

American baseball player (born 1995)

- Pitcher
- Born: March 31, 1995 (age 30); Franklin, Wisconsin, U.S.
- Bats: Left Throws: Left

Evan Jacob Kruczynski (born March 31, 1995) is an American former professional baseball pitcher. He pitched in the St. Louis Cardinals farm system from 2017 to 2021 and played college baseball for the East Carolina Pirates.

== Amateur career ==
Kruczynski attended Franklin High School in Franklin, Wisconsin. He helped Franklin win baseball state championships as a freshman in 2010 and a sophomore in 2011. As a junior in 2012, he was 4–4 with a 1.97 ERA, striking out 73 batters in 46 1/3 innings pitched. Undrafted out of high school, he enrolled at East Carolina University where he played college baseball for the East Carolina Pirates.

Kruczynski made only three appearances as a freshman in 2014, but in 2015, as a sophomore, led the team with 16 starts in which he posted an 8–4 record with a 3.17 ERA. As a junior in 2016, he pitched to an 8–1 record with a 2.01 ERA in 17 starts. In 2017, as a senior for the Pirates, he suffered a broken leg and only made ten starts in which he compiled a 4–3 record with a 4.47 ERA. After the season, he was drafted by the St. Louis Cardinals in the ninth round of the 2017 MLB draft. He signed for $3,000.

== Professional career ==
=== St. Louis Cardinals ===
After signing, Kruczynski made his professional debut with the Peoria Chiefs. He spent the remainder of the year with Peoria, going 4–3 with a 3.41 ERA in 14 games (13 starts). He began 2018 with the Palm Beach Cardinals, with whom he was named a Florida State League All-Star, and was promoted to the Springfield Cardinals in July. In 21 total starts between the two teams, he was 7–6 with a 3.50 ERA and a 1.14 WHIP. He was assigned to play for the Surprise Saguaros of the Arizona Fall League after the season.

Kruczynski began 2019 back with Springfield, and he was promoted to the Memphis Redbirds in May. He was reassigned back to Springfield in June, and finished the season there. Over 28 games (26 starts) between the two clubs, he pitched to a 4–10 record with a 6.09 ERA, striking out 146 over 147 2/3 innings. He did not play in a game in 2020 due to the cancellation of the minor league season because of the COVID-19 pandemic. He returned to Memphis to begin the 2021 season, but pitched only 18 1/3 innings due to injuries, going 2–0 with a 6.38 ERA and 22 strikeouts. On March 25, 2022, Kruczynski was released by the Cardinals.

=== Lake Country DockHounds ===
On March 31, 2022, Kruczynski signed with the Lake Country DockHounds of the American Association of Professional Baseball. He made 19 appearances (18 starts) for the team, posting a 6-6 record and 5.45 ERA with 100 strikeouts in 102 1/3 innings pitched.

In 2023, Kruczynski pitched in 3 games for Lake Country but struggled immensely, allowing 8 runs in 12 hits and 8 walks with 2 strikeouts in 4 1/3 innings of work. He was released by the team on May 27.
