= Waukesha attack =

Waukesha attack may refer to:

- 2014 Slender Man stabbing, in Waukesha, Wisconsin, on May 31, 2014, where middle school girls attacked and stabbed another middle school girl to appease the fictional character Slender Man.
- 2021 Waukesha Christmas parade attack on November 21, 2021, where a speeding SUV struck parade-goers.

== See also ==
- Waukesha (disambiguation)
