= Kettle Moraine School District =

School district in Wales, Wisconsin

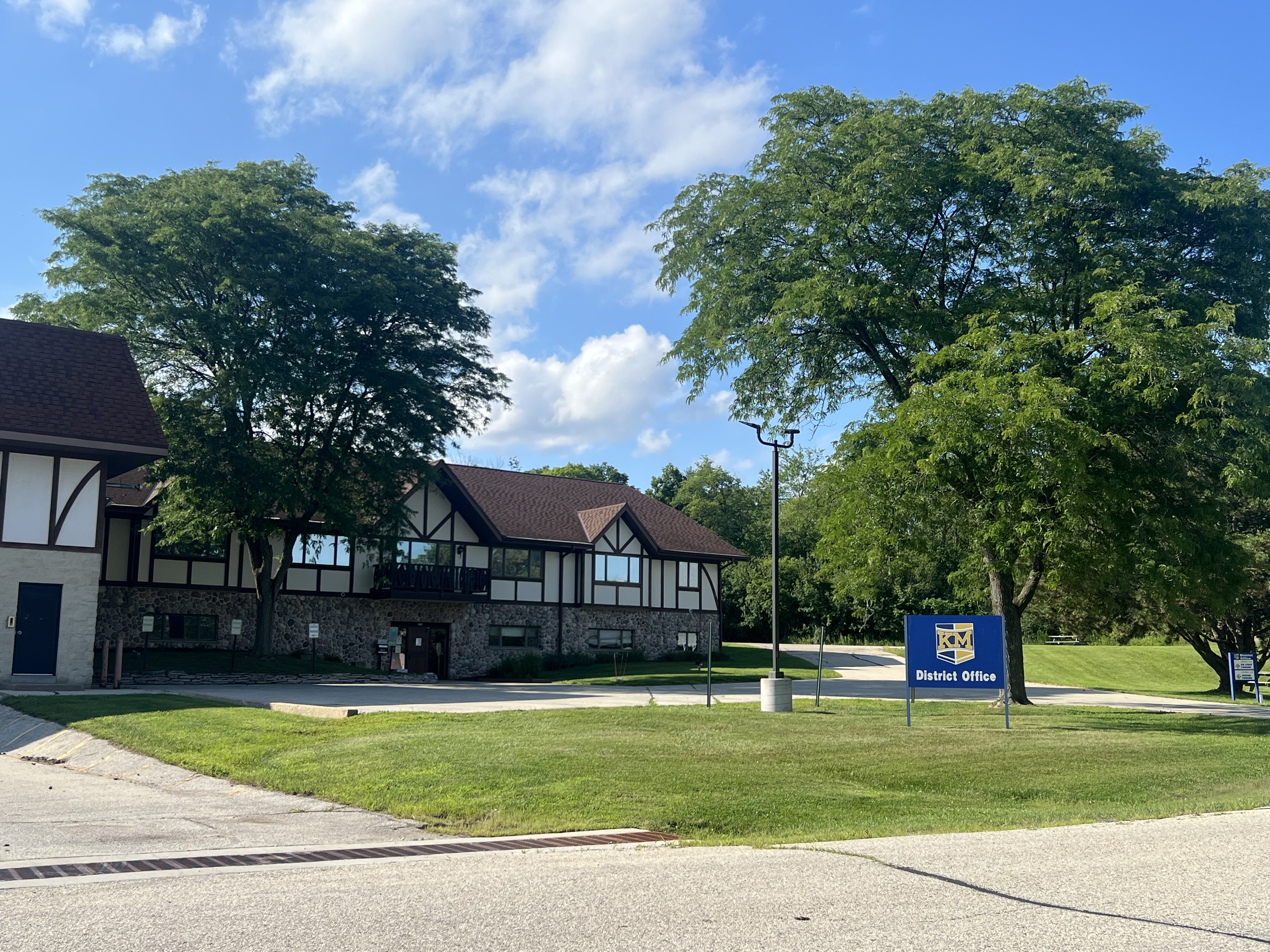
- Kettle Moraine School District office

Address
- 563 A.J. Allen Circle Wales Wisconsin, 53183; United States
- Coordinates: 43°1′1″N 88°22′34″W

District information
- Grades: PK–12
- Schools: 12
- NCES District ID: 5503510

Students and staff
- Students: 3,421 (2023–24)
- Teachers: 231.89 (on an FTE basis)
- Student–teacher ratio: 14.75:1

Other information
- Website: www.kmsd.edu

Kettle Moraine School District is a school district headquartered in Wales, Wisconsin.

The district, mostly in Waukesha County, includes: all of Dousman, almost all of Wales, much of Delafield, a portion of Summit, and a small portion of North Prairie. The Waukesha County portion includes sections of the towns of Genesee and Ottawa. A portion of the district extends into Town of Sullivan, Jefferson County.

== History ==
In 1968 there was a $3,130,000 bond proposal.

Eight persons in the Kettle Moraine Estates subdivision had requested that the subdivision should become a part of this district in a petition they signed. Cooperative Educational Service Agency (CESA) No. 16's Agency School Committee ruled in 1968 that the subdivision should stay in its previous school district.

In July 2022 the school board enacted a policy that prevented employees from having flags in their rooms indicating political movements and which prevented them from indicating what pronouns they prefer using in their e-mail signatures. The board clarified that LGBT pride flags are included in the ban. Students are still allowed to use both. The policy was criticized for targeting "attacks at specific viewpoints, like LGBT communities, or welcome and safe spaces to students of color", and over 13,000 people signed a petition to oppose the policy.

== Schools ==
Secondary

- Kettle Moraine High School
- High School of Health Sciences
- KM Perform
- KM Global
- KM Connect
- Kettle Moraine Middle School

Elementary

- Cushing Elementary School
- Dousman Elementary School
- Kettle Moraine Explore
- Magee Elementary School
- Wales Elementary School
