= WebsterX =

American musician (born 1992)

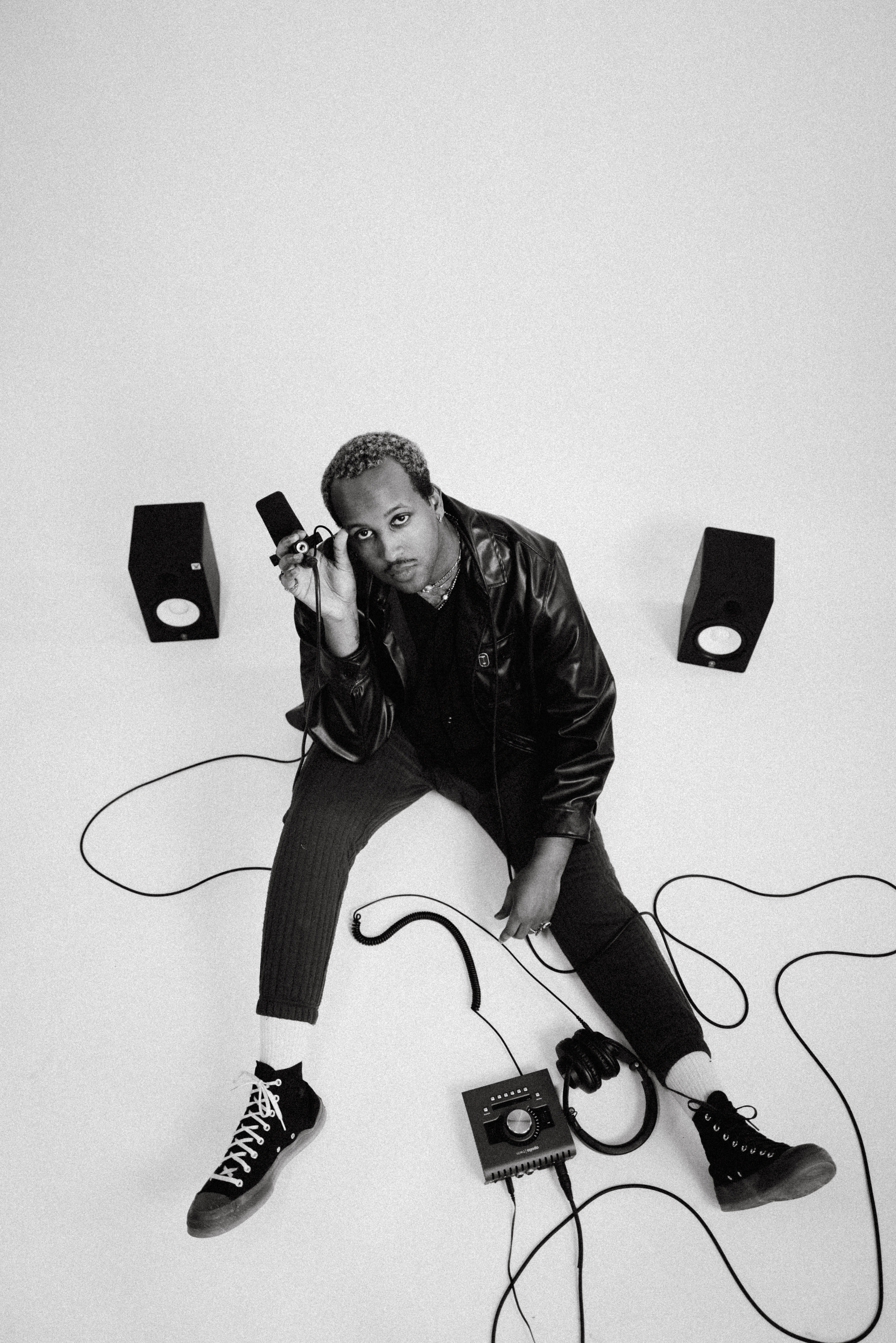
- WebsterX in 2024

Background information
- Born: Sam Ahmed; September 24, 1992 (age 34); Milwaukee, Wisconsin, U.S.
- Genres: Hip Hop, Indie Rock, Electronic, Indie Pop
- Occupations: Rapper; singer; songwriter
- Years active: 2013–present
- Website: www.webster-x.com

Sam Ahmed better known as WebsterX is an American singer, songwriter and rapper. The Fader speaks to his work as a "personal dive into the rapper's psyche", as he wrestles with his "doubts and fears but ultimately provides glimmers of hope throughout." In 2016, WebsterX was awarded 'Solo Artist of the Year' by the Radio Milwaukee Music Awards, sponsored by Koss. In 2016, WebsterX signed to Chicago-based label Closed Sessions until September 2019, whose alumni include Jamila Woods, Noname (rapper), Freddie Gibbs, Raekwon, Action Bronson and many more. His song "Intuition" was featured in a Super Bowl ad for the Microsoft Surface, starring Arizona Cardinals wide receiver Larry Fitzgerald. WebsterX was set to perform alongside Bon Iver for his Wisconsin Get Out the Vote tour in October 2020 but has since been cancelled due to COVID-19. His music has been featured in The Fader, NPR, Complex, PBS, Paper Magazine, Vice, Bonafide Magazine, Hypebeast, Koss, TimeOut, and Pitchfork.

== Early life and education ==
Inspired by a family legacy in music, WebsterX was born to Ethiopian immigrant parents – his father is musician Abdi Guitar of musical group Roha Band. WebsterX was born and raised in Milwaukee, WI and graduated from Wauwatosa East High School in 2011. In 2014, WebsterX dropped out of the University of Wisconsin-Milwaukee after studying marketing and creative writing for six semesters and decided to pursue music and art full-time.

== Career ==
WebsterX released his debut mixtape Desperate Youth in 2013, followed by the 2015 breakout single "Doomsday" and its subsequent video, which propelled him into the national spotlight and made him a blog favorite. In late 2015, he released a collaborative EP with NAN producer Q the Sun, called KidX. The same year he opened for Earl Sweatshirt, and Bassnectar at Somerset Music Festival marking his first big festival. In March 2017 he released his 15-track debut album Daymares, which was awarded No. 1 on the Journal Sentinel's Best Milwaukee Albums of 2017 List. WebsterX performed at SXSW in both 2016 and 2018. Notable 2019 performances include opening for Lil Yachty at Freakfest. In fall of 2019 WebsterX was selected by director Enrique "Mag" Rodriguez, for an offer to join the Backline Music generator, a 12-week grant accelerator program developed by venture capital firm Gener8tor, which provides coaching, mentoring, industry networking, and grants to cohorts of up to three musicians annually.

Aside from music, WebsterX supports youth-oriented community engagement and is a co-founder of organization Freespace, founded in 2015 as a free, monthly, all-ages music showcase that invites Milwaukee's young creatives to come together and collaborate. Hosts bring together guest youth artists mainly from Milwaukee's North and West sides and build skills as experienced headliners perform alongside emerging artists. Interviews are also conducted with the artist in front of an audience. Freespace evolved into The New State, an upcoming permanent all-ages music venue, engineering studio, consignment store and performance space in the heart of Milwaukee. WebsterX was additionally part of the Milwaukee music collective, New Age Narcissism. The group – whose members include Kiran Vedula, Lex Allen, Siren, Lorde Fred33, Bo Triplex, Jay Anderson, and Christopher Gilbert – each having their own solo careers, sporadically performed and created together. The group toured and collaborated with Milwaukee Public Schools, performing at elementary and middle schools while educating students on music entrepreneurship.

In 2020, WebsterX hosted the 3,000 rider strong Black Is Beautiful benefit bike ride in honor of POC Mental health, proceeds going to local charities Walnut Way & Wisconsin Bike Fed.

In September 2026 his song “Skin” was the closing track of “A Perfect World,” episode 2 of season 2 of Dark Matter.

== Musical style ==
WebsterX has been described as being rooted in hip-hop with genre bending in indie, psychedelic and punk rock. WebsterX likes to define his style as "genreless" pulling from all of his influences growing up and in present time.

== Discography ==
Studio albums

- 1 of 1 (2021)
- Daymares (2017)

Extended plays

- KidX (2015)

Singles

- "8:08pm" (2021)
- "HUFFY" (2021)
- "Ain't My Fault" (2018)
- "No End" (2018)
- "Feels" (2018)
- "Everfeel" (2017)
- "Intuition" (2017)
- "Lost Ones Freestyle" (2016)
- "Blue Streak" (2016)
- "Kinfolk" (2015)
- "Lately" (2015)
- "Doomsday" (2015)

== Tours ==
Headlining

- The Lost Ones Tour (2016)

Supporting

- Get Out the Vote Tour – Bon Iver (2020; cancelled)
