= Waukesha County (disambiguation) =

Waukesha County is a county in the U.S. state of Wisconsin.

Waukesha County may also refer to:

- Waukesha County Airport, Waukesha County, Wisconsin, US
- Waukesha County Technical College, Waukesha County, Wisconsin, US
