= Wauwatosa School District =

School district in Wisconsin, United States

Address
- 12121 W North Ave Wauwatosa, Wisconsin; United States

District information
- Grades: PreK–12
- Schools: 17
- NCES District ID: 5515990

Students and staff
- Students: 6,761 (2023–24)
- Teachers: 516.4 (on an FTE basis)
- Student–teacher ratio: 13.09

Other information
- Website: www.wauwatosa.k12.wi.us

The Wauwatosa School District is a comprehensive community public school district that serves student in prekindergarten through twelfth grade from Wauwatosa, Wisconsin, United States.

== History ==
In August 2022 the school district established a new curriculum for sex education.

In October 2022 Beck Andrew Salgado of the Milwaukee Journal Sentinel wrote that the "stability" of the district was damaged by political pressures and by some fights that occurred on campuses.

In late October 2022 members of Moms for Liberty and other right wing groups went to a meeting of the board of trustees, and police intervened.

== Schools ==
Schools in the district (with 2016-17 enrollment from the National Center for Education Statistics) are as follows:

=== Elementary schools (grades K-5) ===
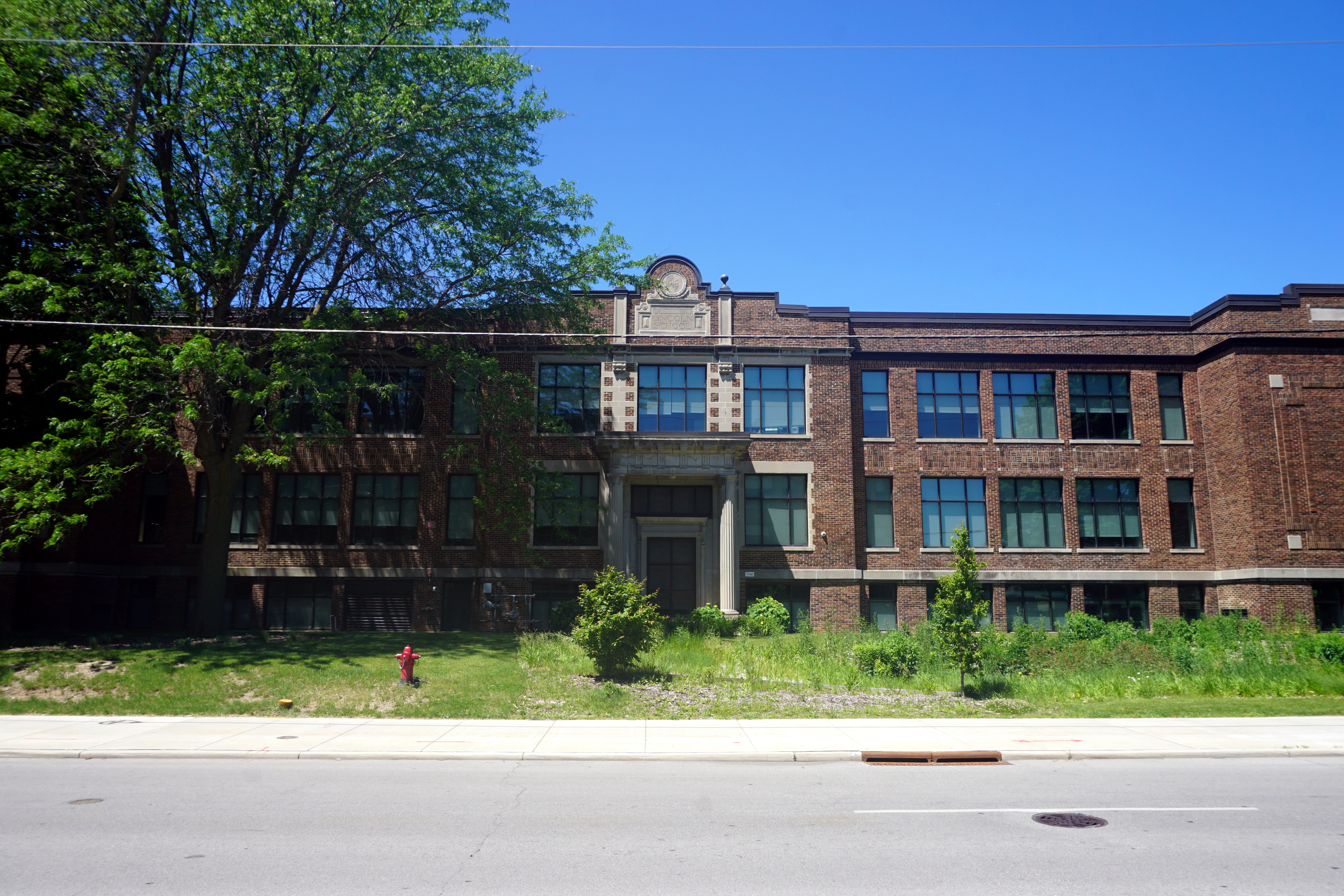
Lincoln Elementary School

- Eisenhower Elementary - 390 students
- Jefferson Elementary - 277 students
- Lincoln Elementary - 303 students
- Madison Elementary - 310 students
- McKinley Elementary - 414 students
- Roosevelt Elementary - 395 students
- Underwood Elementary - 288 students
- Washington Elementary - 341 students
- Wauwatosa STEM School - 133 students
- Wilson Elementary - 147 students

=== Montessori Schools (grades K-8) ===
- Wauwatosa Montessori School - 165 students

=== Middle schools (grades 6-8) ===
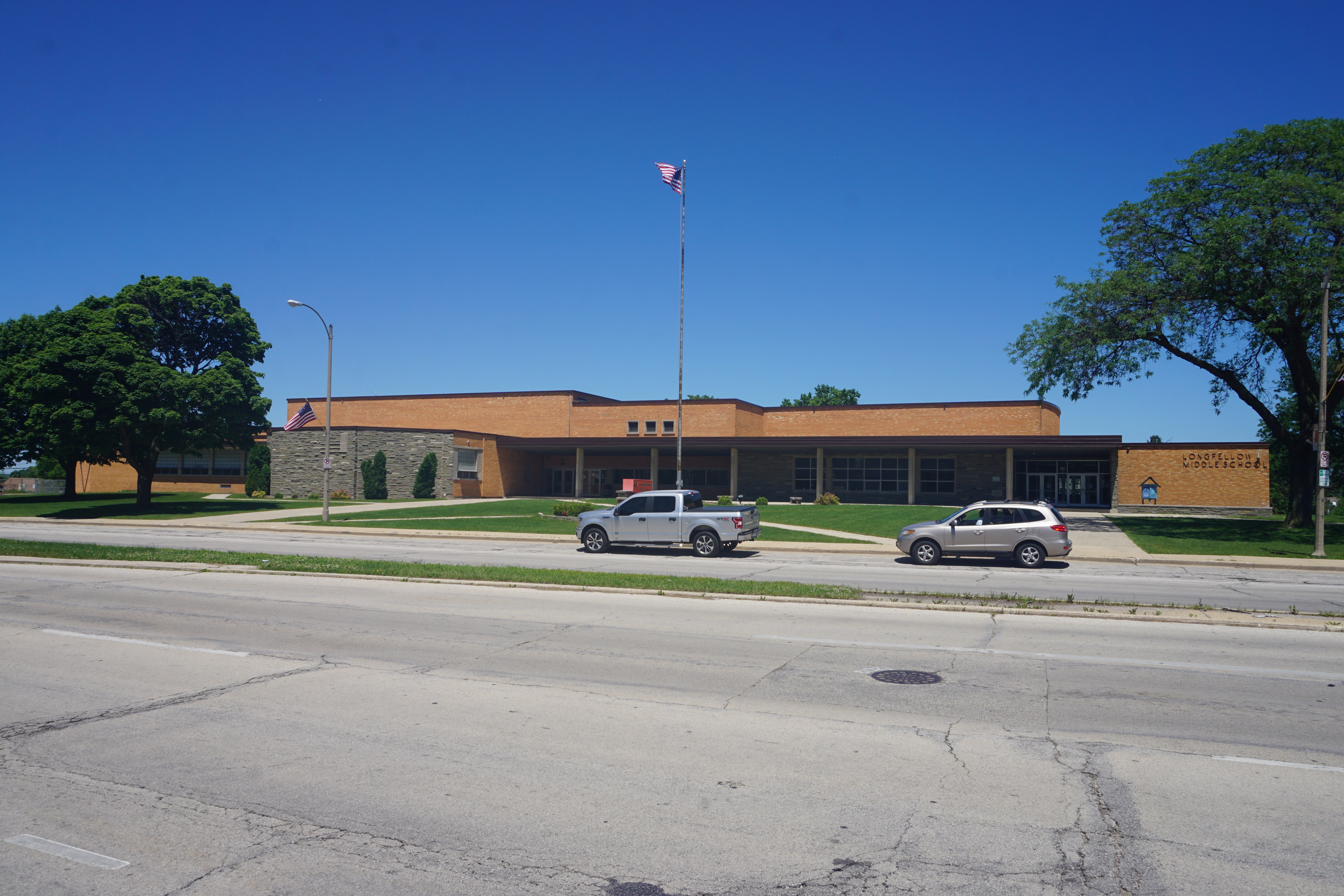
Longfellow Middle School

- Longfellow Middle - 874 students
- Whitman Middle - 709 students

=== High schools (grades 9-12) ===
- Wauwatosa East High School - 1,088 students
- Wauwatosa West High School - 1,071 students

=== Other ===
- Alternative Program
- Additional WSD services are provided to juvenile residents of the Milwaukee County Grounds—at Children's Hospital of Wisconsin and the Milwaukee County's Children and Adolescent Services Center—through the River Hills School on the Milwaukee County Mental Health Complex grounds. County juveniles in secure detention receive educational services through the Vel R. Phillips Juvenile Justice Center School within the Milwaukee County Children's Court building.
