= Kettle Moraine High School =

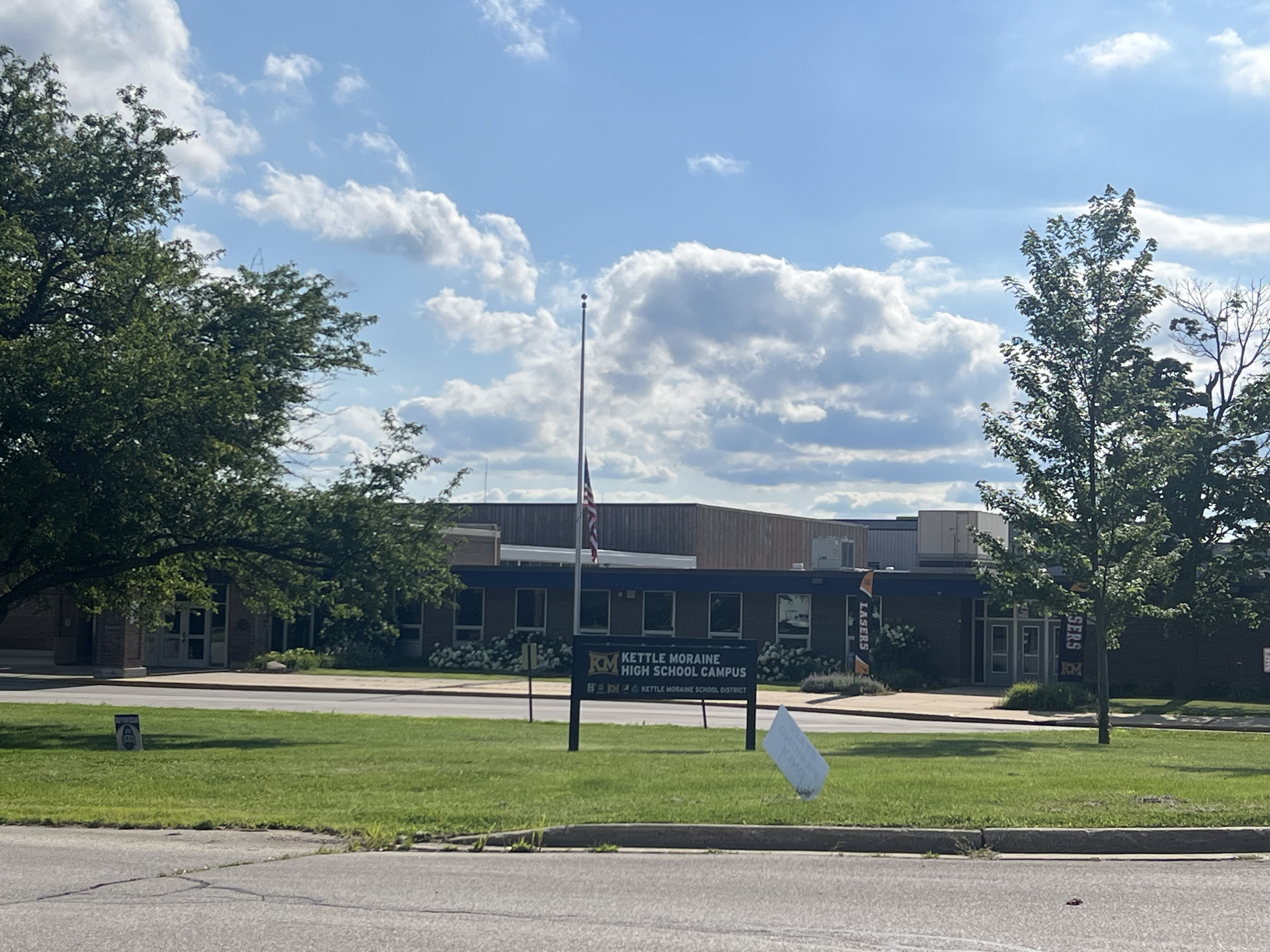

Location
- 349 N Oak Crest Dr; Wales, Wisconsin; United States; 43.00945°N 88.3777°W

Information
- Type: Public Secondary
- Established: 1965
- School district: Kettle Moraine School District
- Principal: Justin Bestor
- Teaching staff: 57.32 (FTE)
- Grades: 9–12
- Enrollment: 886 (2023–2024)
- Student to teacher ratio: 15.46
- Colors: Blue and gold
- Mascot: Captain Laser
- Nickname: Lasers
- Website: kmsd.edu/hs

Kettle Moraine High School (KMHS) is a secondary school located in Wales, Wisconsin. It is a part of the Kettle Moraine School District.

It is accredited by the North Central Association of Colleges and Schools (NCA CASI). Kettle Moraine was named a National Blue Ribbon School of Excellence in 2002 by the U.S. Department of Education.

== Attendance boundary ==
The district (of which KM High is the sole comprehensive high school), mostly in Waukesha County, includes all of Dousman, almost all of Wales, much of Delafield, a portion of Summit, and a small portion of North Prairie. The Waukesha County portion includes sections of the towns of Genesee and Ottawa. A portion of the district extends into the town of Sullivan, in Jefferson County.

== Charter schools ==
The Kettle Moraine High School campus contains four charter schools in addition to Kettle Moraine High School, nicknamed, "Legacy." Charter school students may participate in any extracurricular activities, including sports, open to Kettle Moraine High School students under the same name.

KM Global, founded in 2011, uses seminars, field trips, and internships to teach a global perspective and leadership. Global blends elements of traditional high school with that of cyber schools.

KM Perform, founded in 2011, teaches music, art, creative writing, and theater through workshops and seminars while students take math and science classes online or through Legacy.

The High School of Health Sciences (HSHS, HS^{2}), founded in 2014, partners with Prohealth Care, Aurora Medical Center-Summit, and Medical College of Wisconsin to teach about biology and healthcare through hands-on experience.

KM Connect, founded in 2023, offers part or full time digital instruction for students that do not or can not attend school in person.

== Extracurricular activities ==
=== Clubs ===
KM offers a range of student clubs and organizations, and hosted the regional DECA competition on January 10, 2009.

=== Athletics ===
Kettle Moraine supports 15 boys' and 12 girls' interscholastic athletic programs in the Classic 8 Conference. After winning a State Championship in football in 2022, the Lasers have officially been dubbed a football school. Kettle Moraine won the WIAA state team championships in boys' cross country (1970), baseball-summer (1988), football (1988 and 2022), girls' basketball (1999, 2022 and 2023), boys' track (2008), boys’ golf (2021) girls’ golf (2018), boys’ volleyball (2020), boys' lacrosse (2016, 2017, and 2019) and the inaugural WIAA girls’ lacrosse championship (2024).

== Notable alumni ==
- David Braun – college football coach
- David Koepp – director and screenwriter
- Joe Randa – former Major League Baseball player
- Trey Wedig – NFL offensive tackle for the DC Defenders
