= Franklin High School (Wisconsin) =

Public high school in Franklin, Wisconsin, United States

Location
- 8222 S 51st Street; Franklin, Wisconsin 53132; United States; 42.89581°N 87.97777°W

Information
- Type: High school
- Motto: Respect Others Act Responsibly (ROAR)
- Established: 1962; 64 years ago
- School district: Franklin Public Schools
- NCES School ID: 550483000522
- Principal: Michael Vuolo
- Teaching staff: 97.75 (FTE)
- Grades: 9–12
- Enrollment: 1,605 (2024-2025)
- Student to teacher ratio: 16.42
- Colors: Black and Vegas Gold
- Athletics conference: Southeast Conference and Greater Metro Conference
- Mascot: Saber-Toothed Tiger
- Rival: Oak Creek High School
- Accreditation: North Central Association
- Newspaper: Saber Slate
- Website: Official website

Franklin High School is a public high school in Franklin, Wisconsin. There are 1,605 students enrolled as of the 2024–2025 school year. Its mascot is the Saber-toothed tiger, and the school colors are black and gold. The building is currently being expanded to include a fieldhouse.

== Student body ==
=== Demographics ===
- American Indian/Alaskan Native - 0.5%
- Asian - 11%
- Black - 3%
- Hawaiian Native/Pacific Islander - 0.1%
- Hispanic - 6%
- White - 79%
- Two or more races - 0.1%
- Total minority enrollment - 21%

=== Gender ===
- Male - 52%
- Female - 48%

=== Economically disadvantaged students ===
- Free lunch program - 13%
- Reduced lunch program - 2%
- Total economically disadvantaged - 15%

== Extra-curricular activities ==
Year	Fall	Winter	Spring	Summer
Academic Decathlon	Girls' Cross Country	Boys' basketball	Forensics	
FIRST Robotics Competition - 2506	Boys' Cross Country	Bowling	Boys' golf	
Creative Writing Club	Fall play	Chess	Math team	
FBLA	Football	Gymnastics	Girls' soccer	
Model United Nations	Girls' golf	Skiing	Girls' softball	
Multicultural Club	Boys' soccer	Boys' Swimming and Diving	Spring Musical	
National Honor Society	Girls' swimming and diving	Hockey	Boys' tennis	
Dance Team	Girls' tennis	Wrestling	Co-ed track	
SADD (Students Against Destructive Decisions)	Boys' volleyball	Girls' Basketball	Girls' Lacrosse	
Student Senate	Girls' volleyball		Boys' Lacrosse	
Forensics	Competitive Marching Band		Boys' Baseball	
Mock Trial				
Anime Club				
Cheerleading				

=== Athletics ===
Franklin High School athletic teams compete in the Southeast Conference of the WIAA. All sports compete in Division 1 athletics.

==== Football ====
Franklin High School’s football program competes in WIAA Division 1 and is a member of the Southeast Conference. The team has won two state championships, in 2006 and 2021, with the 2021 team completing an undefeated 14–0 season under head coach Louis Brown. Franklin has consistently qualified for postseason play, including a runner-up finish in 2023.

=== State championships ===
- Baseball: 2010, 2011
- Football: 2006, 2021
- Girls' gymnastics: 2011, 2012, 2013, 2014, 2016, 2017, 2018, 2019, 2022, 2024
- Dance: 2007, 2008, 2009, 2010, 2011, 2012, 2013, 2014, 2016, 2017, 2018, 2019, 2020, 2022, 2023, 2024, 2025
- Boys' track and field: 1969
- Girls' track and field: 2014

=== Conference affiliation history ===
- Parkland Conference (1963-1993)
- Woodland Conference (1993-1997)
- Southeast Conference (1997–present)

== 2024 referendum (Franklin Forward) ==
Beginning in the spring of 2023, the Franklin Public School District began looking at new additions to their properties. In November 2024, a referendum for $145 million was put on the ballot which would include a fieldhouse and new tech spaces.

== Notable alumni ==
- Eric Bugenhagen, professional wrestler
- Evan Kruczynski, pro baseball
- Sean McGuire, pro football
- Nate Mooney, actor, class of 1990
