= Wauwatosa East High School =

Location
- 7500 Milwaukee Ave; Wauwatosa, Wisconsin 53213-2206; United States; 43.05327°N 88.00632°W

Information
- Type: Public high school
- Established: as Wauwatosa Senior High School, 1897; as Wauwatosa East, 1960
- School district: Wauwatosa School District
- Principal: Stephen Plank
- Teaching staff: 68.85 (FTE)
- Grades: 9–12
- Enrollment: 1,041 (2023-2024)
- Student to teacher ratio: 15.12
- Colors: Red and white
- Athletics conference: WIAA Greater Metro Conference
- Mascot: Captain Red
- Nickname: Red Raiders
- Rival: Wauwatosa West High School
- Accreditation: North Central Association of Colleges and Schools
- Website: Wauwatosa East High School homepage
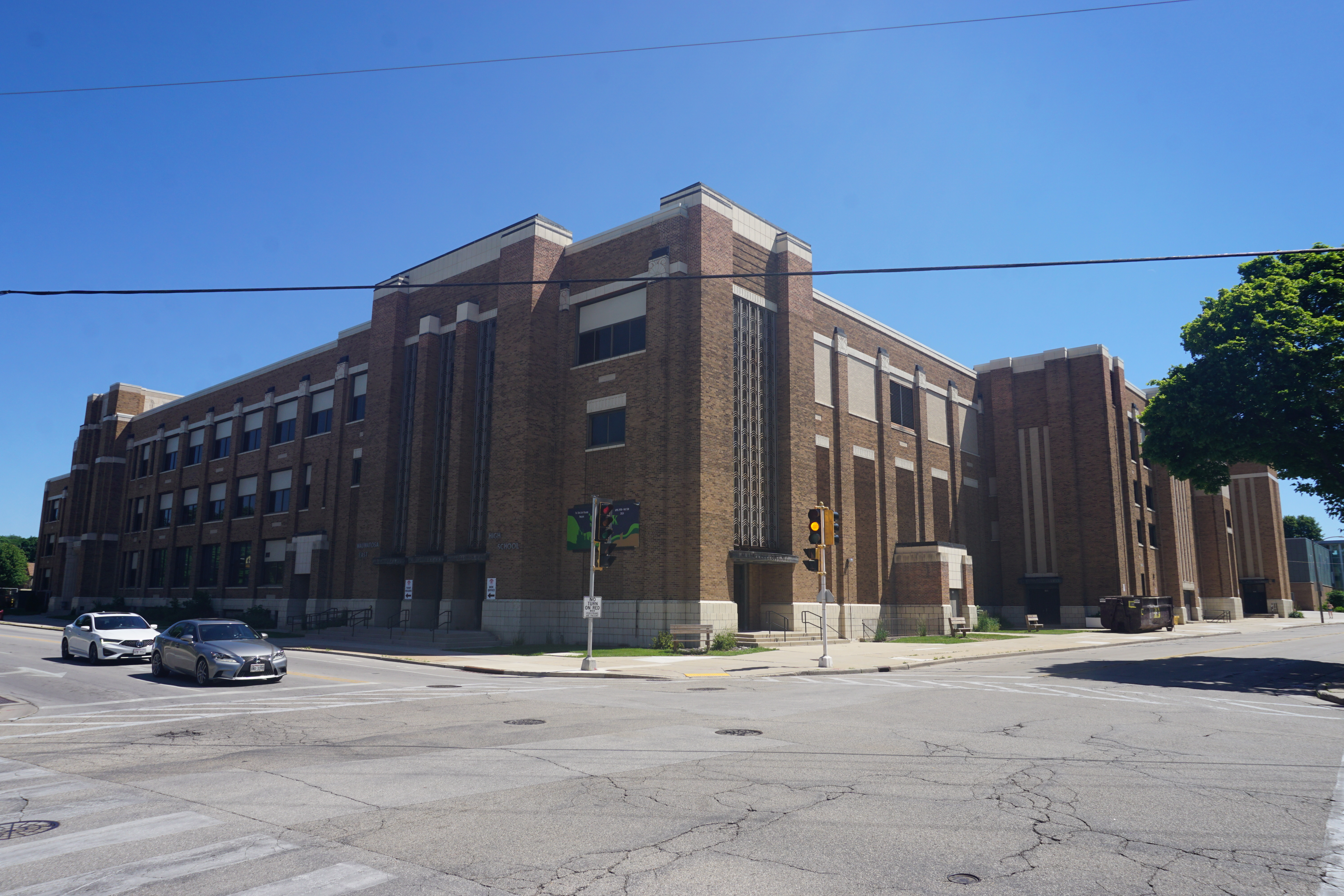

Wauwatosa East High School is a comprehensive four-year public high school in the city of Wauwatosa, Wisconsin. It is part of the Wauwatosa School District. The school was originally known as Wauwatosa Senior High School until the opening of Wauwatosa West High School in September 1960. The first graduating class of Wauwatosa East High School was in June 1962. Today, the school is often colloquially referred to as Tosa East.

== History ==
The first high school in Wauwatosa opened at the site of the current Wauwatosa East building in 1871. Originally known as Wauwatosa High School, the school's name was changed to Wauwatosa East High School in September, 1961 after a rival high school was built on the west side of the city. The older half of the current structure started being built in 1928, construction resumed in 1930 for it to be completed in 1931. The auditorium and original gymnasium were then completed in 1940. An underground tunnel was built to connect the high school to a middle school across the street, the middle school was built in 1906 but it originally served as Wauwatosa High until 1931. The tunnel allowed students of Wauwatosa High to go to the middle school across the street to use it for activities, the tunnel was decommissioned in 1958 when the middle school was torn down to be replaced with an addition for Lincoln Elementary.

The newer half of the current structure was built from 1973 to 1975. This resulted in substantial alterations to the original design of the building such as the closing of the school's third floor, small fourth floor, and basement lunch room in 1974, they were closed and replaced with the addition to modernize the building. The tower that stood on top of the original front entrance was removed in 1974. The Art Deco lobby below the tower contained tiled walls and New Deal era paintings, the paintings were painted in 1934 by Myron Nutting for the Public Works Administration. The murals, tile, and trophy cases were covered with plaster board which was added to make the historic lobby match the newer addition. The walls and paintings remained covered until the early 2000s where they were restored, the trophy cases are now used to display Tosa High School memorabilia and historical information about the building.

The sports teams are named the Red Raiders. They were once represented by a logo of a cartoon Native American brave in warpaint and a mascot dressed as a Native American. In 2006 this came under protest, which led to the logo being changed to a shield with the letters 'TE' on the front and crossed spears behind and the mascot being changed to a pirate known as Captain Red.

== Athletics ==
The school has varsity level sports teams for both men and women, including volleyball, basketball, softball, baseball, soccer, football, golf, wrestling, tennis, swimming and diving, cross country, track and field, and the Poms dance squad.

Intramural sports include Ultimate Frisbee, IBA (basketball), and skiing.

=== State championships ===
- 1937: Boys' golf
- 1940: Boys' swimming and diving
- 1943: Boys' track and field
- 1944: Boys' swimming and diving
- 1945: Boys' swimming and diving
- 1946: Boys' golf, boys' swimming and diving, boys' cross country
- 1947: Boys' tennis, boys' swimming and diving
- 1948: Boys' basketball
- 1949: Boys' swimming and diving
- 1950: Boys' swimming and diving
- 1951: Boys' swimming and diving
- 1954: Boys' golf
- 1955: Boys' tennis
- 1956: Boys' tennis, boys' swimming and diving
- 1972: Boys' track and field, Class A
- 1974: Girls' volleyball, Class A
- 1975: Girls' volleyball, Class A
- 1980: Girls' volleyball, Class A
- 1981: Girls' basketball, Class A
- 1985: Girls' volleyball, Class A
- 1989: Boys' basketball, Class A; boys' volleyball, Class A
- 1990: Boys' soccer
- 1992: Girls' volleyball, Division 1
- 1993: Girls' soccer
- 1994: Girls' volleyball, Division 1
- 1996: Girls' soccer
- 1996: Boys' Volleyball
- 1997: Girls' soccer, Division 1
- 1997: Baseball
- 1998: Boys' soccer, Division 1
- 2006: Boys' volleyball
- 2008: Boys' basketball, Division 1
- 2016: Boys' table tennis, Division 1
- 2021: Boys' basketball, Division 1
- 2025: Girls' basketball, Division 2

=== Conference affiliation history ===
- Suburban Conference (1925-1985)
- North Shore Conference (1985-1993)
- Woodland Conference (1993-1997)
- Greater Metro Conference (1997–present)

== Awards ==
In 2008, Wauwatosa East was recognized as a Blue Ribbon School.

== Notable alumni ==
- Antler (born 1946), poet and educator; poet laureate of Milwaukee, 2002–03
- Hailey Danz (born 1991), American paratriathlete; gold medalist at the 2024 Summer Paralympics
- Jovan Dewitt (born 1975), American football player and coach; NCAA Division 2 All-American player, NCAA Division 1 FBS Coach
- Nancy Dickerson (1927–1997), pioneering radio and television journalist and reporter
- Devin Harris (born 1983), professional basketball player (NBA)
- Lucille Shapson Hurley (1922–1988), nutritionist
- Tim Knoll, freestyle BMX rider
- Mike Krol (born 1984), musician
- Sd Laika (in memoriam, 2023), musician
- Marcus Mbow (born 2003), professional football player for the New York Giants
- John Morgridge (born 1933), businessman; CEO and chairman of Cisco Systems
- Jeremy Scahill (born 1974), political writer and documentary filmmaker
- Richard Schickel (1933–2017), film critic, author, and documentary filmmaker
- Jerry Smith (born 1987), professional basketball player
- Tony Smith (born 1968), professional basketball player (NBA)
- Pete Stark (1931–2020), politician; member of the United States House of Representatives, 1973-2013, D-California
- Thomas A. Steitz (1940–2018), biochemist; Nobel Prize in Chemistry laureate
- Phillips Talbot (1915–2010), diplomat; United States Ambassador to Greece 1965-1969
- Sugar Todd (born 1990), professional speed skater; member 2014 U.S. Olympic team
- Michael Torke (born 1961), musician and composer
- Ignatiy Vishnevetsky (born 1986), Russian-born film critic and essayist
- WebsterX (born 1992), musician
