= Wauwatosa West High School =

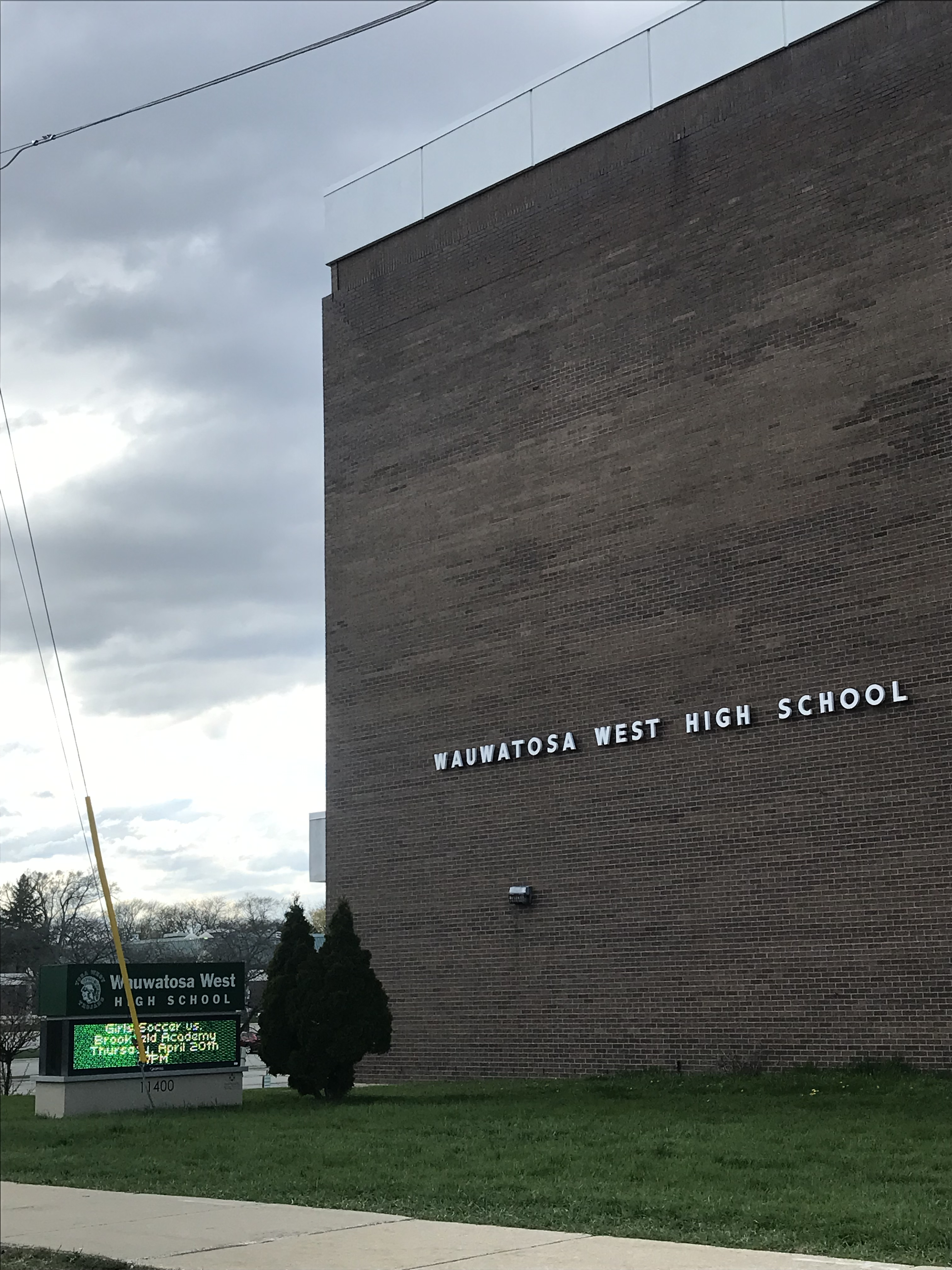

Location
- 11400 West Center Street; Wauwatosa, Milwaukee, Wisconsin 53222-4213; United States; 43.0683°N 88.05544°W

Information
- Type: Public high school
- Motto: "Where Every Student Strives"
- Established: 1960
- School district: Wauwatosa School District
- NCES School ID: 551599002091
- Principal: Corey Golla
- Faculty: 67.96 FTEs
- Grades: 9–12
- Enrollment: 1,028 (2023-2024)
- Average class size: 25-32
- Student to teacher ratio: 15.13
- Hours in school day: 7:50AM to 3:10PM
- Campus type: Suburban
- Color: Green White
- Slogan: "Strive for Greatness"
- Athletics: Baseball, Basketball, Cheerleading, Cross country, Football, Golf, Hockey, Lacrosse, Soccer, Softball, Swimming & Diving, Tennis, Track & Field, Volleyball, Wrestling
- Athletics conference: Greater Metro
- Mascot: Tommy Trojan
- Team name: Trojans
- Rival: Wauwatosa East
- Newspaper: The Tosa Compass
- Yearbook: Olympian

Wauwatosa West High School is a comprehensive four-year public high school located in the city of Wauwatosa, Wisconsin, United States. West opened in 1960/1961 as a sister-school to Wauwatosa East High School; together they are part of the Wauwatosa School District.

== History ==
Overcrowding of the city's only high school led the city to build a new high school on the west side of the newly enlarged city. Built in 1960 at 11100 West Center Street and opened in 1961, it was called Wauwatosa West High School. The original high school was renamed Wauwatosa East. Because the Longfellow and Hawthorne Junior High Schools were also overcrowded, another school was built in 1969 just west of this building at 11400 West Center Street.When the new building opened, it became Wauwatosa West High School, and the previous building became Whitman Junior High School. Originally scheduled for completion in 1970, a fire damaged part of the building during construction, delaying its opening until 1971.

On December 1, 1993, 46-year-old Dale Breitlow, the school's associate principal, was shot and killed by 21-year-old Leonard McDowell inside a hallway. McDowell, a former student, was convicted of first degree intentional homicide for the shooting and was sentenced to life in prison.

== Enrollment ==
As of the 2017–18 school year, the school had an enrollment of 1,152 students and 68.4 classroom teachers (on an FTE basis), for a student–teacher ratio of 16.9:1. There were 169 students (14.7% of enrollment) eligible for free lunch and 29 (2.5% of students) eligible for reduced-cost lunch.

== Extracurricular activities ==
=== Athletics ===
The school won the Wisconsin State Boys Volleyball Championship in 1964, defeating Antigo High School in a pool of 70 participating schools.

The boys' swimming team won the 1971 state championship, defeating runner-up Waukesha High School in a field of 77 participating schools.

The city on June 4, 2002, gave Wauwatosa West the go-ahead to begin construction on a $1.5 million upgrade of its athletic facilities.

The school dance team (division 2) known as "TDT" or Trojan Dance Team has won multiple WACPC state championships in 2018, 2020, 2022, and 2023 since they began the team.

==== Conference affiliation history ====
- Suburban Conference (1961-1985)
- North Shore Conference (1985-1993)
- Woodland Conference (1993-2017)
- Greater Metro Conference (2017–present)

=== Fine Arts ===
Student musicians and thespians participate in a variety of extracurricular activities, including band, orchestra, and theater.

The band department's performing groups include marching band, pep band, concert band, and jazz band. The band traveled to Hawaii in April 2015, visiting and performing at the Pearl Harbor Memorial.

The symphony orchestra and concert orchestra perform throughout the year, including a holiday "Kinderkonzert" for children in the community.

Led by Adam Steffan, the theatre department, better known as the Tosa West Trojan Players, puts on two major productions each year. The Trojan Players participate in a state-wide theatre awards program called "The Jerry Awards". These awards commemorate and recognize excellence in high school performing arts. To date, the Trojan Players have received nine Outstanding Musical awards from "The Jerry Awards", with their 9th win being their Fall 2023 Wisconsin High School Premiere of Frozen: The Broadway Musical. After competing in a nation-wide contest called "The US of Frozen", Wauwatosa West was granted the rights to perform the first full-length high school production of Frozen: The Broadway Musical. The Trojan Players have now reached 11 outstanding musical wins, the most recent being Hadestown: Teen Edition and Legally Blonde.

=== Auditorium ===
The Wauwatosa West Auditorium holds over 700 seats for audiences with their two major musicals per year. Outside the auditorium, there is a showcase displaying different aspects of Tosa West's fine arts. This showcase was remodeled in 2022 and named after former theatre student Mary Kayser, who died in 2021.

== Notable alumni ==
- Scott Bergold (born 1961), offensive tackle who played one season in the NFL for the St. Louis Cardinals
- Michael G. Kirby (born 1952), former member of the Wisconsin State Assembly
- John La Fave (born 1949), Wisconsin politician
- Karen McQuestion, author
- Steve Sisolak (born 1953), Governor of Nevada
- Andrew Stadler (born 1988), professional soccer player in Sweden
