= Catholic Memorial High School =

Private school in Waukesha, Wisconsin, USA

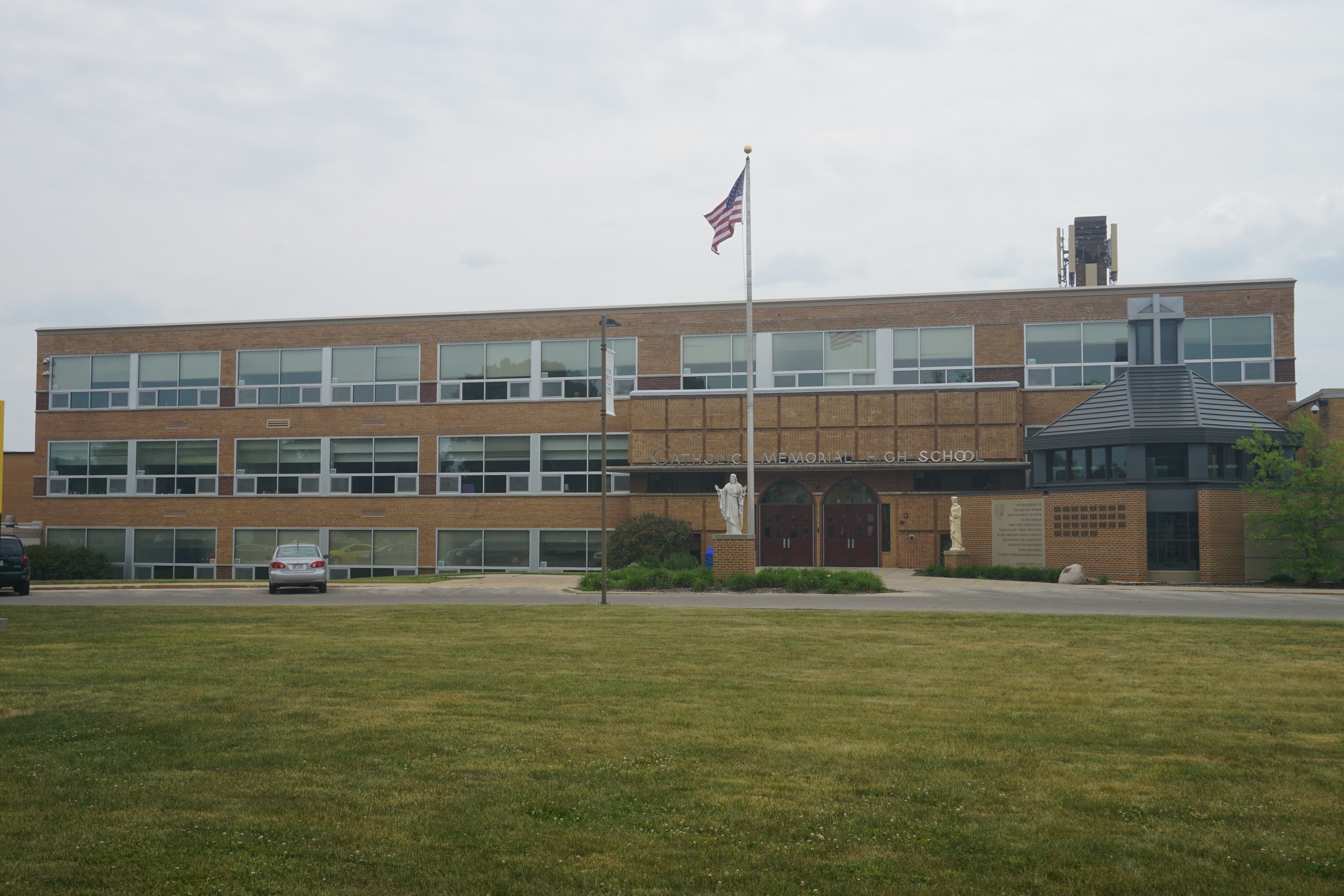

Location
- 601 East College Avenue; Waukesha, (Waukesha County), Wisconsin 53186; United States
- 43°0′9″N 88°13′13″W

Information
- Type: Private, Coeducational
- Motto: Caritas in Omnibus (Charity in All Things)
- Religious affiliation: Roman Catholic
- Established: 1949
- Oversight: Roman Catholic Archdiocese of Milwaukee
- President: Donna Bembenek
- Principal: Bonnie Scholz
- Faculty: 80
- Grades: 9–12
- Enrollment: 613 (2025-2026)
- Colors: Marian Blue & Pontifical Gold
- Athletics conference: Classic 8 Conference; Parkland Conference for football
- Mascot: Crusader
- Accreditation: North Central Association of Colleges and Schools
- Newspaper: The Crusaders
- Yearbook: The Knight
- Athletic Director: Matthew Bergan
- Website: catholicmemorial.net

Catholic Memorial High School (or CMH) is a co-educational Catholic high school in Waukesha, Wisconsin. Established in 1949, it is a member of the National Catholic Educational Association and is a World School in the International Baccalaureate Organization.

== Alumni and faculty ==
- Brad Beyer '91, actor
- Meghan Coffey '02, Miss Wisconsin 2006
- Mark Gundrum '88, legislator and jurist
- Matt Katula '00, a long snapper for the NFL's Baltimore Ravens, New England Patriots and Minnesota Vikings
- JC Latham, attended for his freshman and sophomore year before transferring to IMG Academy
- Leslie Osborne '01, member of the 2000 national championship soccer team and the USA Women's World Cup team
- Jerry Schumacher '88, three-time All-American and three-time All-Big Ten selection in cross country and track at the University of Wisconsin–Madison from 1988 to 1993, Nike Oregon Project Coach
- John Spytek, General manager of the Las Vegas Raiders
- Bill Stetz, a guard for the NFL's Philadelphia Eagles
- Bill Young, 400 career high school football wins
