= Waukesha School District =

School district in Wisconsin, United States

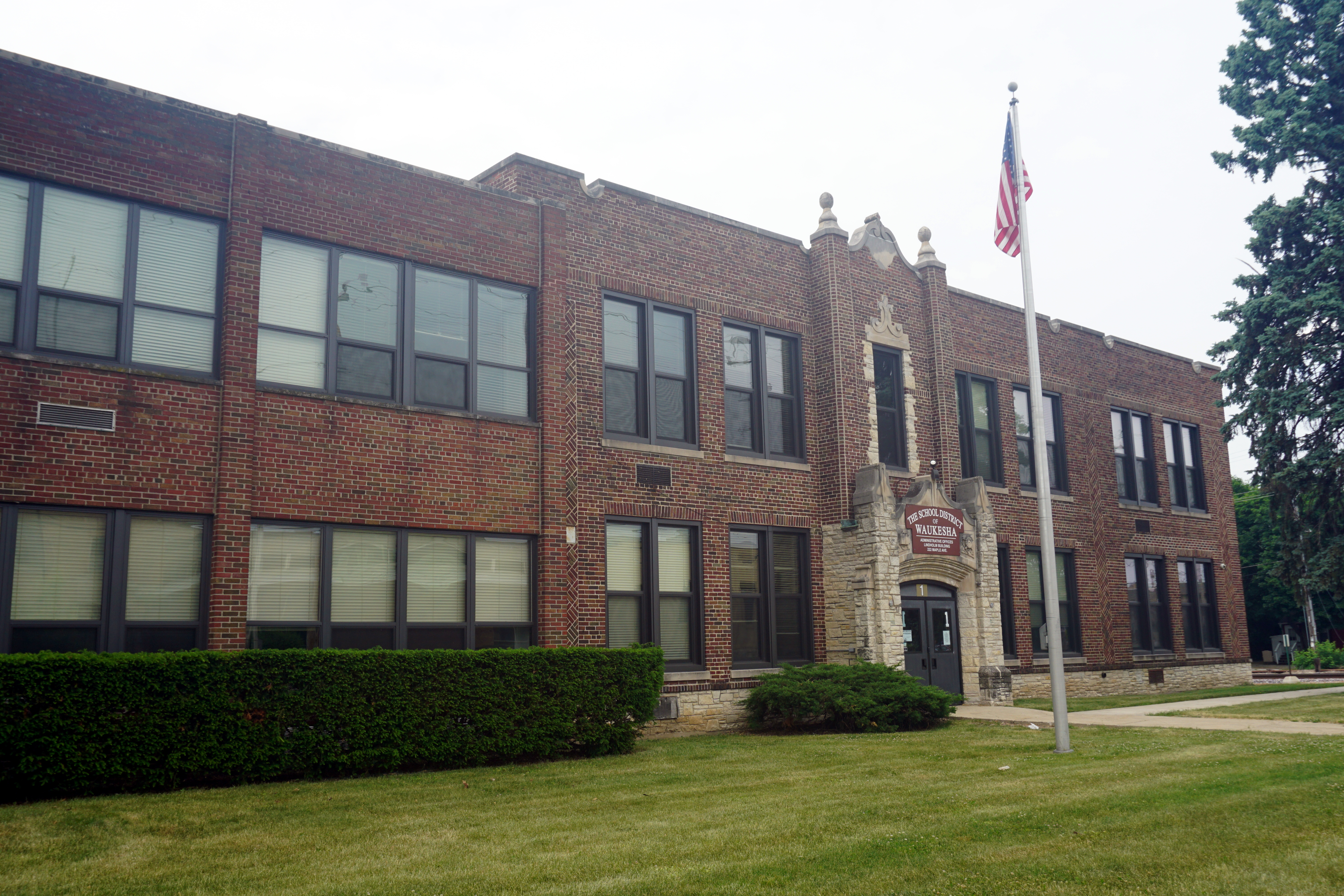
- School District of Waukesha Administration Building

Address
- 222 Maple Ave Waukesha, Waukesha County, Wisconsin; United States

District information
- Grades: PreK–12
- Schools: 27

Students and staff
- Students: 11,318
- Teachers: 795.67 FTE
- Student–teacher ratio: 14.22:1

Other information
- Website: sdw.waukesha.k12.wi.us

The Waukesha School District is a school district that serves the city of Waukesha and parts of the Village of Waukesha, Town of Brookfield, city of Brookfield, and city of Pewaukee in Waukesha County, Wisconsin. The district serves over 14,000 students and administers three high schools, three middle schools, 15 elementary schools, and four charter schools. It is governed by a board of nine members.

== Student lunch program ==
In August 2021, the Waukesha School Board voted to not participate in the Seamless Summer Option, a United States Department of Agriculture (USDA) universal student lunch program that was extended for the 2021-2022 school year because of the COVID-19 pandemic. Families could still apply for the need-based National School Lunch program. This decision drew widespread criticism. The school board later reversed its decision, voting to participate in the Seamless Summer Option program.

== Elementary school closing of 2022 ==
On March 10, 2022, the district has approved and agreed to close down Whittier Elementary School and merge with Hadfield Elementary School. It was intended for the district to limit the decrease in student populations, improve accessibility for students with special needs, and to combat a $7 million budget shortfall for the 2022-2023 school year.

== Schools ==
The district operates the following schools.

=== Elementary Schools ===
- Banting Elementary School
- Hadfield Elementary School
- Heyer Elementary School
- Hillcrest Elementary School
- Lowell Elementary School
- Meadowbrook Elementary School
- Prairie Elementary School
- Rose Glen Elementary School
- Summit View Elementary School

=== Closed Elementary Schools ===
- Bethesda Elementary (closing 2026)
- Blair Elementary (closed 2019)
- Hawthorne Elementary (closing 2026)
- Pleasant Hill Elementary (closed 2011)
- Saratoga Elementary (closed 2011)
- White Rock Elementary (closed 2012)
- Whittier Elementary(merged with Hadfield 2022)

=== Middle schools ===
- Butler Middle School
- Les Paul Middle School
- Horning STEM Middle School

=== High schools ===
- Waukesha North High School
- Waukesha South High School
- Waukesha West High School

=== Charter schools ===
- Waukesha Engineering Preparatory Academy
- Waukesha Academy of Health Professions
- Waukesha STEM Academy
- eAchieve Academy
