= Wales, Wisconsin =

- Village
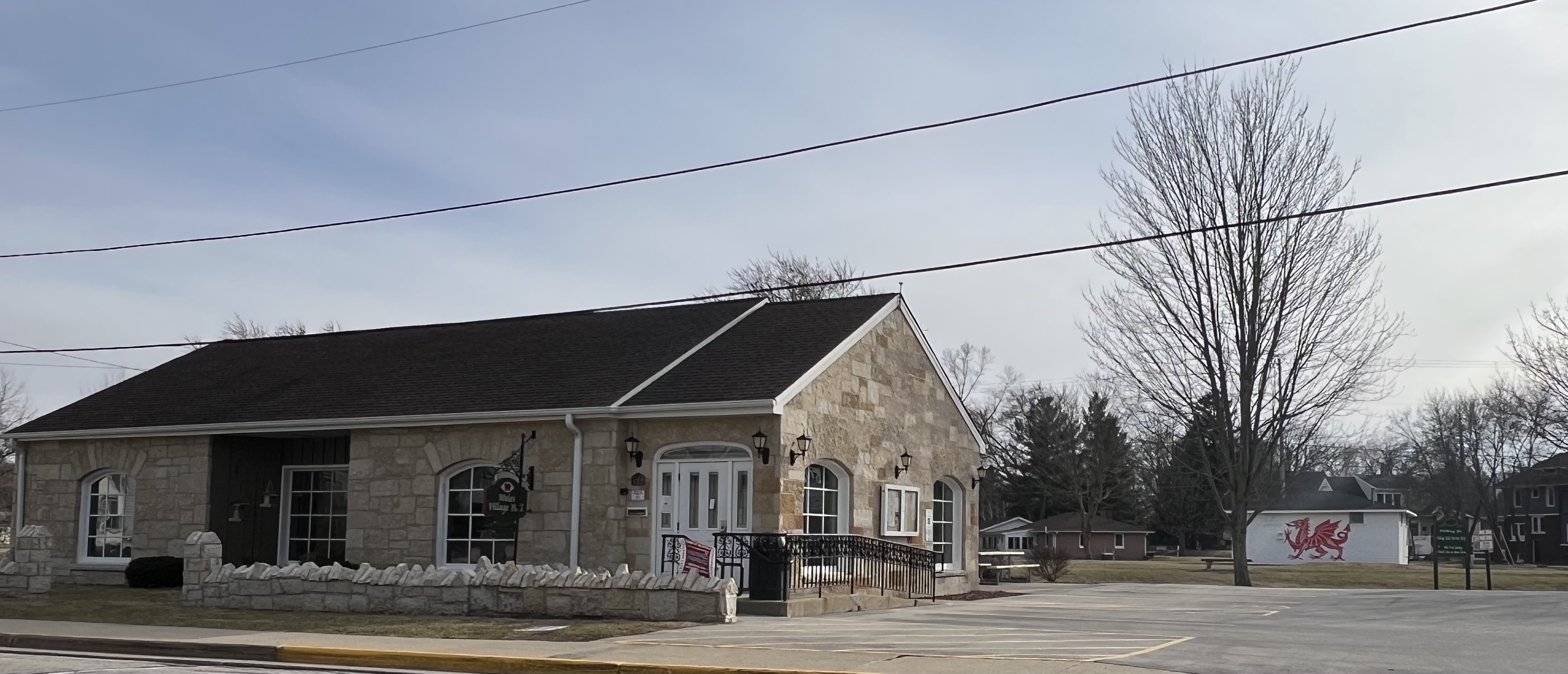
- Wales Village Hall

- Location of Wales in Waukesha County, Wisconsin.
- Coordinates: 43°0′14″N 88°22′39″W
- Country: United States
- State: Wisconsin
- County: Waukesha

Area
  - Total: 3.23 sq mi (8.37 km^{2})
  - Land: 3.23 sq mi (8.36 km^{2})
  - Water: 0.0039 sq mi (0.01 km^{2})
- Elevation: 1,001 ft (305 m)

Population (2020)
  - Total: 2,862
  - Density: 801.3/sq mi (309.39/km^{2})
- Time zone: UTC-6 (Central (CST))
  - Summer (DST): UTC-5 (CDT)
- ZIP Code: 53183
- Area code: 262
- FIPS code: 55-83175
- GNIS feature ID: 1576156
- Website: villageofwales.gov

Wales is a village in Waukesha County, Wisconsin, United States, first settled by Welsh immigrants. The population was 2,862 at the time of the 2020 census.

== Geography ==
Wales is located at 43°0′14″N 88°22′39″W (43.003882, −88.377558). It is approximately 28 miles (45 km) west of Milwaukee. The city is also a few miles south of Lapham Peak State Forest, notable for its many popular hiking trails and for being home to the highest point in Waukesha County, at 1,233 ft (376 m) above sea level.

According to the United States Census Bureau, the village has a total area of 3.29 square miles (8.52 km^{2}), of which 3.28 square miles (8.50 km^{2}) is land and 0.01 square miles (0.03 km^{2}) is water.

== Demographics ==
Historical population
Census	Pop.	Note	%±
1930	132		—
1940	170		28.8%
1950	237		39.4%
1960	356		50.2%
1970	691		94.1%
1980	1,992		188.3%
1990	2,471		24.0%
2000	2,523		2.1%
2010	2,549		1.0%
2020	2,862		12.3%
U.S. Decennial Census

=== 2010 census ===
As of the census of 2010, there were 2,549 people, 949 households, and 792 families living in the village. The population density was 777.1 inhabitants per square mile (300.0/km^{2}). There were 987 housing units at an average density of 300.9 per square mile (116.2/km^{2}). The racial makeup of the village was 97.9% White, 0.4% African American, 0.2% Native American, 0.5% Asian, 0.1% Pacific Islander, 0.2% from other races, and 0.7% from two or more races. Hispanic or Latino of any race were 1.8% of the population.

There were 949 households, of which 37.7% had children under the age of 18 living with them, 68.5% were married couples living together, 10.3% had a female householder with no husband present, 4.6% had a male householder with no wife present, and 16.5% were non-families. 12.5% of all households were made up of individuals, and 3.5% had someone living alone who was 65 years of age or older. The average household size was 2.69 and the average family size was 2.93.

The median age in the village was 43.1 years. 25.8% of residents were under the age of 18; 6.1% were between the ages of 18 and 24; 21.7% were from 25 to 44; 36.7% were from 45 to 64; and 9.8% were 65 years of age or older. The gender makeup of the village was 50.3% male and 49.7% female.

=== 2000 census ===
As of the census of 2000, there were 2,523 people, 846 households, and 731 families living in the village. The population density was 1,033.4 people per square mile (399.2/km^{2}). There were 863 housing units at an average density of 353.5 per square mile (136.6/km^{2}). The racial makeup of the village was 98.61% White, 0.16% African American, 0.24% Native American, 0.24% Asian, 0.20% from other races, and 0.55% from two or more races. Hispanic or Latino of any race were 1.03% of the population.

There were 846 households, out of which 46.2% had children under the age of 18 living with them, 76.7% were married couples living together, 7.0% had a female householder with no husband present, and 13.5% were non-families. 10.2% of all households were made up of individuals, and 2.7% had someone living alone who was 65 years of age or older. The average household size was 2.98 and the average family size was 3.20.

In the village, the population was spread out, with 30.3% under the age of 18, 7.3% from 18 to 24, 29.0% from 25 to 44, 29.2% from 45 to 64, and 4.2% who were 65 years of age or older. The median age was 37 years. For every 100 females, there were 103.5 males. For every 100 females age 18 and over, there were 101.4 males.

The median income for a household in the village was $75,000, and the median income for a family was $77,468. Males had a median income of $50,609 versus $35,268 for females. The per capita income for the village was $26,712. None of the families and 0.2% of the population were living below the poverty line, including no under eighteens and none of those over 64.

== Education ==
- Kettle Moraine School District
- Kettle Moraine High School, a recognized Blue Ribbon School as well as four charter schools on the Kettle Moraine High School campus including the High School of Health Sciences, KM Perform, Km Global, and KM Connect.
- Wales Elementary School and the charter school, KM Explore on the Wales Elementary School campus.

== Recreation ==
- Glacial Drumlin State Trail
- Ice Age National Scenic Trail
- Wales Community Park
- Wales Firemans' Park
- Breconshire park

== Places of worship ==
- Jerusalem Presbyterian Church
- All Saints Lutheran Church
- Bethlehem Lutheran Church
- The Church of Jesus Christ of Latter Day Saints

== Public safety ==
All fire rescue and EMS services are provided by Lake Country Fire and Rescue. Law enforcement in Wales is provided by the Waukesha County Sheriff's Department.

== History ==
Welsh immigrants settled the village of Wales in 1840. The remains of Welsh history can be seen in the village's flag that replicates the Welsh national flag.
