= Waukesha West High School =

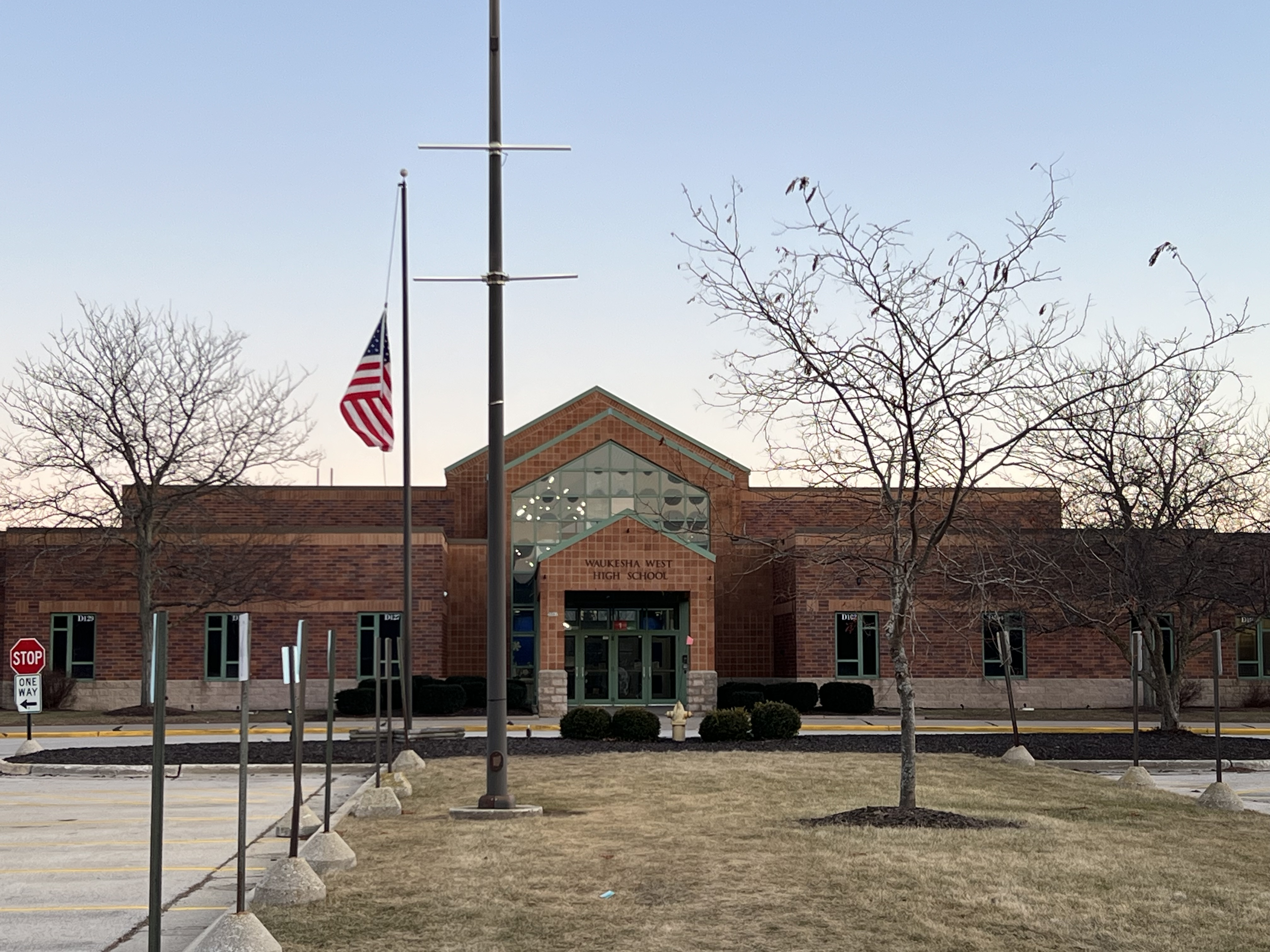

Location
- 3301 Saylesville Road; Waukesha, Wisconsin 53189; United States; 42°58′04″N 88°16′45″W

Information
- Type: Public high school
- Established: 1993
- School district: Waukesha School District
- Principal: Taheréh DeLeón
- Teaching staff: 65.60 (on an FTE basis)
- Grades: 9–12
- Enrollment: 1,192 (2023–2024)
- Student to teacher ratio: 18.17
- Campus: Small city/Rural
- Colors: Royal blue and white
- Slogan: Win the day
- Mascot: Wolverines
- Website: sdw.waukesha.k12.wi.us/WestHS

Waukesha West High School is one of three public high schools located in Waukesha, Wisconsin. The high school was established in 1993.

== History ==
On December 3, 2021, almost two weeks after the Waukesha Christmas parade attack, the principal received an email about a specific threat to students during the lunch period. After consultation with the Waukesha Police Department, the school put in place a "staggered evacuation" of the building.

== Extra-curricular activities ==
=== Academic Decathlon ===
Waukesha West's Academic Decathlon team won the state competition and advanced to the national competition every year between 2002 and 2012. The school placed third or better at the national competition every year between 2002 and 2009, and finished fourth in 2010. The team was the highest-scoring Division II school each year during that time (except for 2006, when they were classified as Division I). The school has also been the national runner-up three times, finishing second to Moorpark in 2003, 2008, and 2009.

At the 2008 National Championship, Moorpark and Waukesha West achieved the two highest team scores ever recorded at any Academic Decathlon competition.

Notably, Waukesha West is the only school in the United States outside of California and Texas to have ever won the USAD National competition, which it did in 2002.

== Athletics ==
The school's seven state championships in women's cross country are the most in state history.

=== State championships ===
- Football – 2004, 2010
- Gymnastics- 1999, 2000, 2001, 2003, 2006, 2007, 2008
- Men's cross country- 1999
- Women's cross country- 1993, 1998, 1999, 2000, 2001, 2004, 2005
- Women's track and field- 2000, 2004, 2005, 2006, 2018
- AAAA Marching Band- 1997, 1999, 2000, 2001, 2004, 2005, 2006, 2016
- Boys soccer- 2024

== Notable alumni ==
- Jarred Kelenic, MLB baseball player, Seattle Mariners, Atlanta Braves
- Dani Rhodes, former soccer player, forward
- Joe Schobert, NFL football player
- Dan Solwold, wrestler, ring name Austin Aries
- Erik Sowinski, middle-distance runner
