= Spanjer =

Spanjer is a surname of Dutch origin, originating as a habitational name for someone from Spain. Notable people with the surname include:

- Harry Spanjer (1873–1958), American lightweight and welterweight boxer
- Ralph H. Spanjer (1920–1999), American major general
