= John M. Cavey =

American politician and lawyer

John Manning Cavey (May 30, 1907 – November 7, 1982) was an American politician and lawyer. He served in the Wisconsin State Assembly.

== Biography ==
Born in Milwaukee, Wisconsin, Cavey went to St. John's Northwestern Military Academy in Delafield, Wisconsin. He served in the United States Army during World War II. Cavey went to University of Notre Dame, University of Minnesota, and Marquette University. He then received his law degree from Marquette University Law School is practiced law in Milwaukee, Wisconsin. He served in the Wisconsin State Assembly and was a Republican.
