= Arthur S. Born =

United States Navy admiral

Arthur Stephen Born
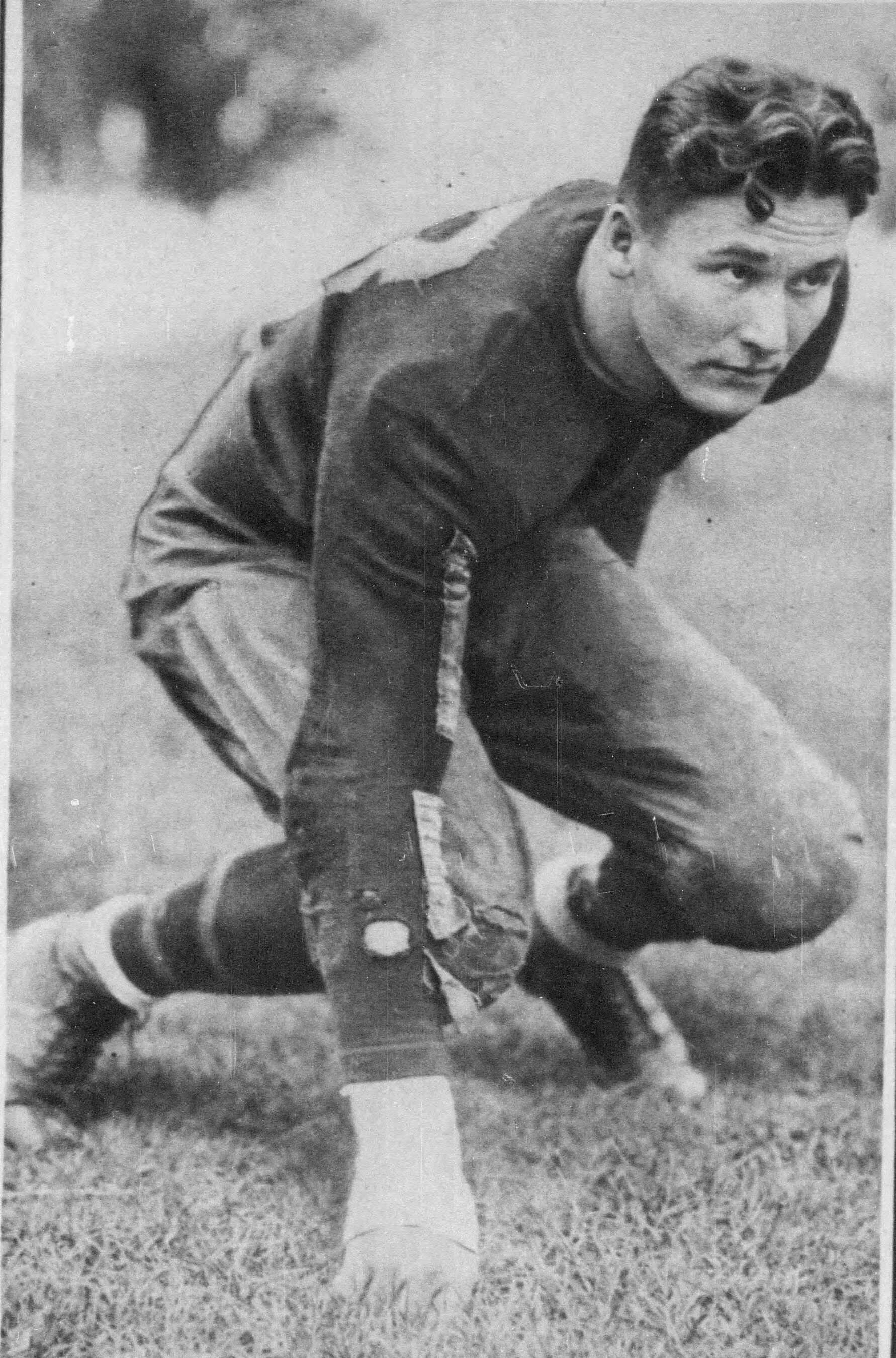
- Born, circa 1926
- Born: September 2, 1904; Racine, Wisconsin, United States
- Died: February 13, 1968 (aged 63); Dallas, Texas, United States
- Burial place: Arlington National Cemetery
- Relatives: Brother: Charles F. Born
- Military career
- Allegiance: United States
- Branch: United States Navy
- Service years: 1927–1955
- Rank: Rear Admiral (lower half)
- Nickname: "Ben"
- Commands: USS Badoeng Strait; Fleet Air Wing II
- Conflicts: Yangtze Patrol; World War II
- Awards: Legion of Merit with "V" device Bronze Star; Presidential Unit Citation; Yangtze Service Medal
- Other work: Collins Radio Company

Arthur Stephen Born (2 Sept 1904 – 13 Feb 1968) was a rear admiral of the United States Navy. While attending the United States Naval Academy, Born was a star player for the Navy Midshipmen football team.

== Early life ==
Arthur S. Born was born in Racine, Wisconsin, to Frank and Martha (née: Madera) Born. His father was born in Germany and was a city of Racine fireman. His older brother was USAF General Charles F. Born, and his younger brother was Navy Captain Howard Born, he also had a younger sister, Grace. He was a graduate of St. John's Military Academy in Delafield, WI, as a member of the class of 1923.

== Naval Academy and football career ==
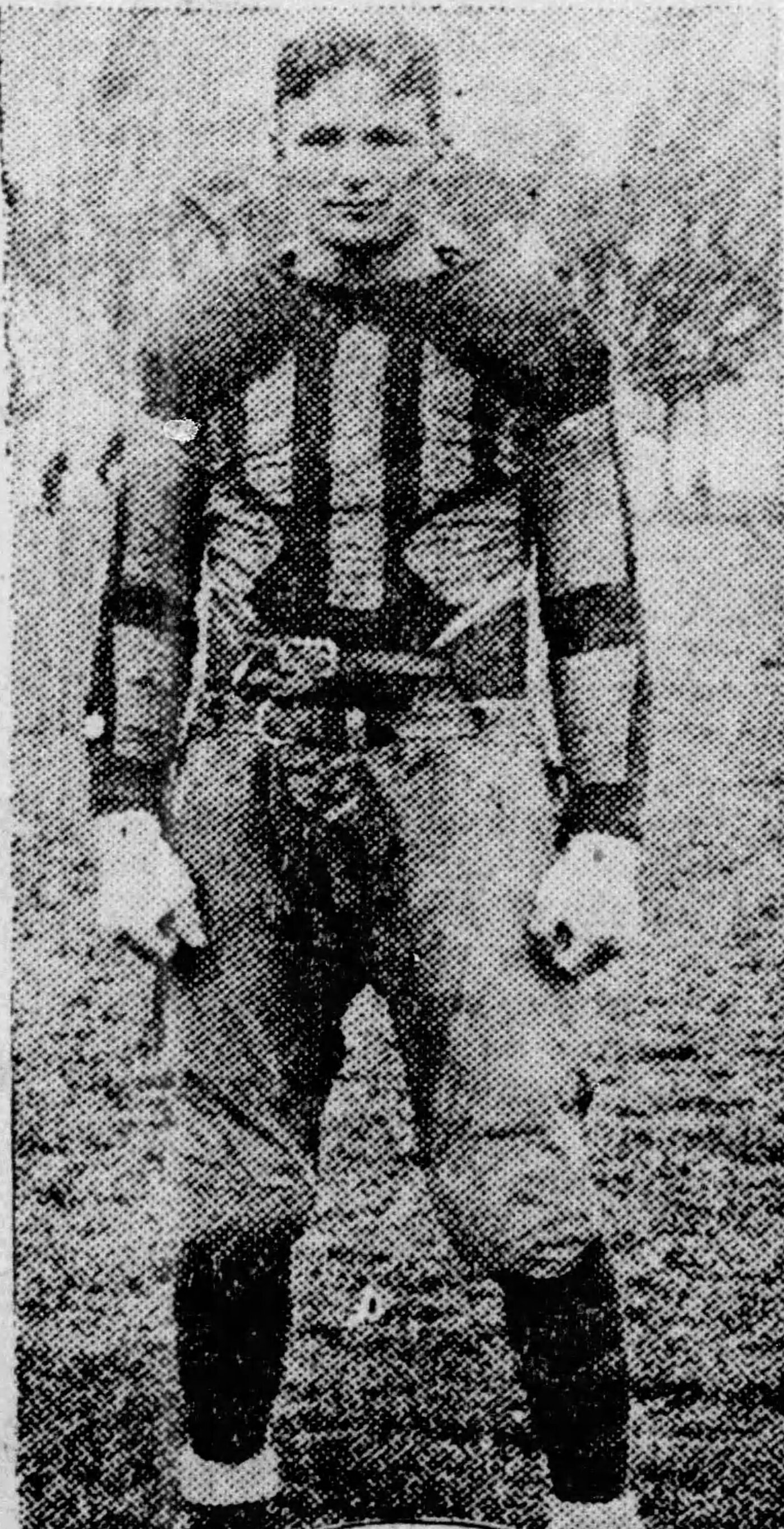
Born playing football

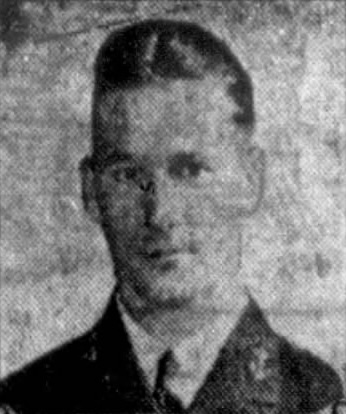
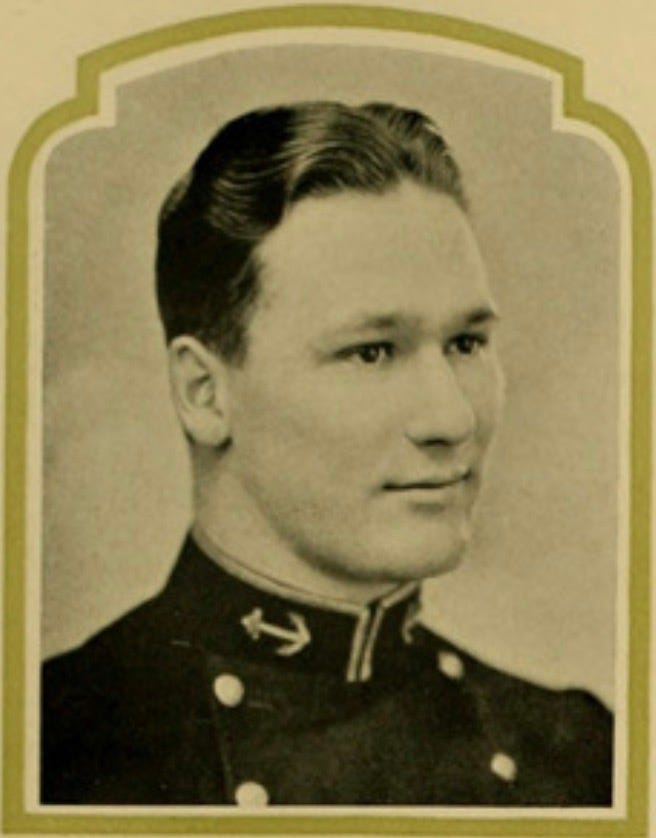
Portraits of Born as a student of the Naval Academy, 1926 and 1927

Born attended and graduated with honors from the U.S. Naval Academy, as a member of the class of 1927.

At the academy, Born played guard for the Navy Midshipmen football team. In the highly-publicized 1926 Army–Navy Game, attention was given to the fact that Born and his brother Charles were playing for the opposing military academy teams (with Charles playing for Army).

Born's younger brother, Howard, played football for Navy as well when he attended the academy.

== Naval career ==
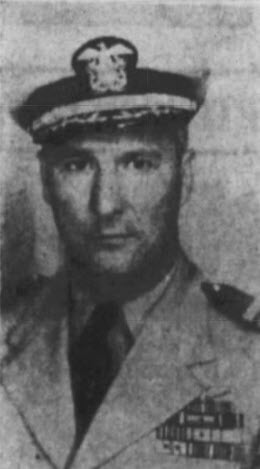
Portrait of Born during his naval career

Born was commissioned as an officer in the Navy in 1927 and served until 1955, retiring as a Rear Admiral.

Admiral Born first entered into active-duty service in 1927. His first duty assignment was aboard the Battleship USS Tennessee. In 1929 he was transferred to Naval flight training school in Pensacola, FL, where he earned the designation of a naval aviator in 1930. From there, he was assigned to USS Houston’s aviation unit, and flew in combat missions during the Yangtze China Campaign. In 1934, he was accepted into the post-graduate school program and sent back to Annapolis for studies, then U.C. Berkely where he completed the Electronics Engineering Course and earned his master’s degree. In 1938, he returned to the fleet and was assigned to the VS-3, a scouting and dive bomb squadron aboard the USS Saratoga. From 1938 to 1940, he was assigned to Admiral Halsey's staff in Carrier Division 1. From 1940 to 1943, he was assigned as a Radio Test Officer at NSF Anacostia in Washington DC, and in August of 1943, to the Staff of the Commander, Pacific Fleet. In 1944, he was assigned to the USS Yorktown (CV-10) first as Air Officer, then Executive Officer, and was awarded the Legion of Merit with combat V for "operations against the enemy during the period 29 June 1944 to 10 April 1945". In July 1945, he was transferred to the Office of Naval Operations for duties working with aviation electronics requirements. From December 1948 to December 1949, he commanded the carrier USS Badoeng Strait (CVE-116) and promoted permanently to Captain during that time. In May 1950, he was appointed as the Director of Electronics Division in the Navy’s Bureau of Aeronautics (BuAer). In June 1952, he was given command of Fleet Air Wing Eleven at NAS Cecil Field, FL. His last duty assignment was in 1954 as the Executive Officer to the Assistant Secretary of Defense for Applications Engineering.

He Retired from the Navy in 1955 after 32 years of active duty, and was tombstone promoted to Rear Admiral.

== Post-Naval career ==
Upon retiring, Born took a position with the Collins Radio Company in Cedar Rapids, IA, as the Assistant to the Vice-President, Research & Development. He eventually transferred to the Dallas, TX location where he worked until his death in 1968.

== Personal life and death ==
Born was married 3 times: In 1929, he married the former Colleen Stubbs (d.1951); Mary Elizabeth O'Brien in 1952 (d.1964); and Carol Jean Blanchard in 1966. He died on September 2, 1968 in Dallas Texas and was laid to rest at Arlington National Cemetery.

== Legacy ==
Arthur was credited with being the leading US developer of anti-submarine warfare techniques in WWII. His accomplishments included designing several types of airborne antennas for VHF and UHF use. He was a member of the team that was awarded the Collier Trophy in 1948 "for development of an Air Traffic Control system for safe, unlimited operation of aircraft in all weather conditions." In 1965, He was elected to the grade of Fellow by the Institute of Electrical and Electronics Engineers (IEEE) for his contributions in the field of air navigational aids.
