= Montoute =

Montoute is a surname. Notable people with the surname include:

- Édouard Montoute (born 1970), French actor
- Lenard Montoute (born 1962), Saint Lucian politician
- Sankar Montoute (born 1961), Trinidadian football player
