= Keystone, Iowa =

- City
- Location of Keystone, Iowa
- Coordinates: 42°0′3″N 92°11′55″W
- Country: United States
- State: Iowa
- County: Benton

Area
  - Total: 0.45 sq mi (1.16 km^{2})
  - Land: 0.45 sq mi (1.16 km^{2})
  - Water: 0 sq mi (0.00 km^{2})
- Elevation: 883 ft (269 m)

Population (2020)
  - Total: 599
  - Density: 1,336.6/sq mi (516.05/km^{2})
- Time zone: UTC-6 (Central (CST))
  - Summer (DST): UTC-5 (CDT)
- ZIP code: 52249
- Area code: 319
- FIPS code: 19-41115
- GNIS feature ID: 0458064
- Website: www.keystoneiowa.com

Keystone is a city in Benton County, Iowa, United States. The population was 599 at the time of the 2020 census. It is part of the Cedar Rapids Metropolitan Statistical Area.

== History ==
Keystone was platted in 1881 when the Chicago, Milwaukee, and St. Paul Railroad was extended to that point.

== Geography ==
Keystone is located at 42°00′03″N 92°11′55″W.

According to the United States Census Bureau, the city has a total area of 0.45 square miles (1.17 km^{2}), all land.

== Demographics ==
Historical populations
Year	Pop.	±%
1900	405	—
1910	412	+1.7%
1920	558	+35.4%
1930	499	−10.6%
1940	466	−6.6%
1950	438	−6.0%
1960	522	+19.2%
1970	549	+5.2%
1980	618	+12.6%
1990	568	−8.1%
2000	687	+21.0%
2010	622	−9.5%
2020	599	−3.7%
Source:"U.S. Census website". United States Census Bureau. and Iowa Data Center; Source: U.S. Decennial Census

=== 2020 census ===
As of the census of 2020, there were 599 people, 248 households, and 161 families residing in the city. The population density was 1,336.6 inhabitants per square mile (516.1/km^{2}). There were 278 housing units at an average density of 620.3 per square mile (239.5/km^{2}). The racial makeup of the city was 95.3% White, 0.5% Black or African American, 0.7% Native American, 0.2% Asian, 0.0% Pacific Islander, 0.5% from other races and 2.8% from two or more races. Hispanic or Latino persons of any race comprised 2.0% of the population.

Of the 248 households, 31.5% of which had children under the age of 18 living with them, 49.6% were married couples living together, 8.1% were cohabitating couples, 25.4% had a female householder with no spouse or partner present and 16.9% had a male householder with no spouse or partner present. 35.1% of all households were non-families. 31.0% of all households were made up of individuals, 16.5% had someone living alone who was 65 years old or older.

The median age in the city was 46.0 years. 22.0% of the residents were under the age of 20; 4.0% were between the ages of 20 and 24; 22.0% were from 25 and 44; 28.9% were from 45 and 64; and 23.0% were 65 years of age or older. The gender makeup of the city was 50.1% male and 49.9% female.

=== 2010 census ===
As of the census of 2010, there were 622 people, 250 households, and 165 families living in the city. The population density was 1,382.2 inhabitants per square mile (533.7/km^{2}). There were 280 housing units at an average density of 622.2 per square mile (240.2/km^{2}). The racial makeup of the city was 99.2% White, 0.5% Native American, 0.2% Asian, and 0.2% from two or more races. Hispanic or Latino of any race were 0.6% of the population.

There were 250 households, of which 30.8% had children under the age of 18 living with them, 53.2% were married couples living together, 8.8% had a female householder with no husband present, 4.0% had a male householder with no wife present, and 34.0% were non-families. 32.0% of all households were made up of individuals, and 20.4% had someone living alone who was 65 years of age or older. The average household size was 2.34 and the average family size was 2.93.

The median age in the city was 42.8 years. 24% of residents were under the age of 18; 5.9% were between the ages of 18 and 24; 23% were from 25 to 44; 22.7% were from 45 to 64; and 24.4% were 65 years of age or older. The gender makeup of the city was 45.0% male and 55.0% female.

=== 2000 census ===
As of the census of 2000, there were 687 people, 273 households, and 174 families living in the city. The population density was 1,855.3 inhabitants per square mile (716.3/km^{2}). There were 281 housing units at an average density of 758.9 per square mile (293.0/km^{2}). The racial makeup of the city was 99.42% White, 0.15% African American, and 0.44% from two or more races. Hispanic or Latino of any race were 0.29% of the population.

There were 273 households, out of which 30.4% had children under the age of 18 living with them, 55.3% were married couples living together, 6.2% had a female householder with no husband present, and 35.9% were non-families. 32.6% of all households were made up of individuals, and 22.7% had someone living alone who was 65 years of age or older. The average household size was 2.37 and the average family size was 3.05.

In the city, the population was spread out, with 24.7% under the age of 18, 8.2% from 18 to 24, 23.6% from 25 to 44, 15.4% from 45 to 64, and 28.1% who were 65 years of age or older. The median age was 40 years. For every 100 females, there were 87.2 males. For every 100 females age 18 and over, there were 82.0 males.

The median income for a household in the city was $36,458, and the median income for a family was $48,750. Males had a median income of $33,333 versus $19,375 for females. The per capita income for the city was $18,215. About 1.7% of families and 2.7% of the population were below the poverty line, including 2.4% of those under age 18 and 1.4% of those age 65 or over.

== Education ==
Benton Community School District operates local public schools.

== Notable people ==
- Tim Kapucian (born 1967), Iowa State Senator from the 20th District
- Monte Merkel (1916–1981), American football player
- Miss Piggy (1974), Muppet
