= Monte Merkel =

American football player (1916–1981)

No. 13
- Position: Guard

Personal information
- Born: November 6, 1916; Keystone, Iowa, U.S.
- Died: July 22, 1981 (aged 64); Missoula, Montana, U.S.
- Listed height: 5 ft 10 in (1.78 m)
- Listed weight: 215 lb (98 kg)

Career information
- High school: St. John's Military (Delafield, Wisconsin)
- College: Kansas (1938–1941)
- NFL draft: 1942: undrafted

Career history
- Chicago Bears (1942–1943); → Wichita Aero Commandos (1942); Chicago Bears (1946)*
- * Offseason or practice squad member only
- Stats at Pro Football Reference

Monte John Merkel (November 6, 1916 – July 22, 1981) was an American professional football guard who played one season with the Chicago Bears of the National Football League (NFL). He played college football at the University of Kansas.

== Early life and college ==
Monte John Merkel was born on November 6, 1916, in Keystone, Iowa. He attended St. John's Military Academy in Delafield, Wisconsin.

Merkel was a four-year letterman for the Kansas Jayhawks of the University of Kansas from 1938 to 1941.

== Professional career ==
After going undrafted in the 1942 NFL draft, Merkel signed with the Chicago Bears on August 1, 1942. During the 1942 season, he played for the Bears' farm team, the Wichita Aero Commandos. Merkel played in, and started, one game for the Bears in 1943. On September 29, 1943, he received orders to report to the United States Navy for training. After his stint in the Navy ended, Merkel signed with the Bears again on March 29, 1946. However, he did not end up playing in any games for the Bears that season.

== Personal life ==
Merkel died on July 22, 1981, in Missoula, Montana.
