= Harold J. Week =

American politician and businessman

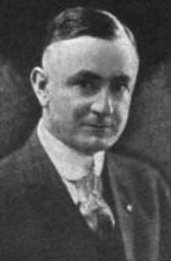

Member of the Wisconsin State Assembly
- In office 1919

Personal details
- Born: February 24, 1884 Stevens Point, Wisconsin, US
- Died: April 28, 1936 (aged 52) Miami, Florida, US
- Party: Republican
- Education: Stevens Point Normal School; St. John's Northwestern Military Academy; University of Wisconsin–Madison
- Occupation: Businessman, politician

Harold J. Week (February 24, 1884 – April 28, 1936) was an American politician and businessman. He served in the Wisconsin State Assembly.

== Biography ==
Born in Stevens Point, Wisconsin, Week went to Chicago Manual Training School in 1899 and 1900, Stevens Point Normal School (now University of Wisconsin–Stevens Point) in 1901, St. John's Northwestern Military Academy in 1902 and 1903, and to the University of Wisconsin–Madison from 1903 to 1907. Because of his health, Week lived in San Benito, Texas from 1912 to 1917 where he managed a ranch and worked at the San Benito Bank and Trust Company. In 1917, Week returned to Stevens Point and worked at his family's business: John Week Lumber Company which Week was the manager. Week was also involved with the Stevens Point National Bank and was secretary of the Stevens Point Police and Fire Commission. In 1919, Week served in the Wisconsin State Assembly and was a Republican.

Week was in ill health, and died in Miami, Florida on April 28, 1936. His mother was staying in Orlando, Florida during the winter.
