= Charles F. Born =

American football player and major general (1903–1979)

Charles Franklin Born
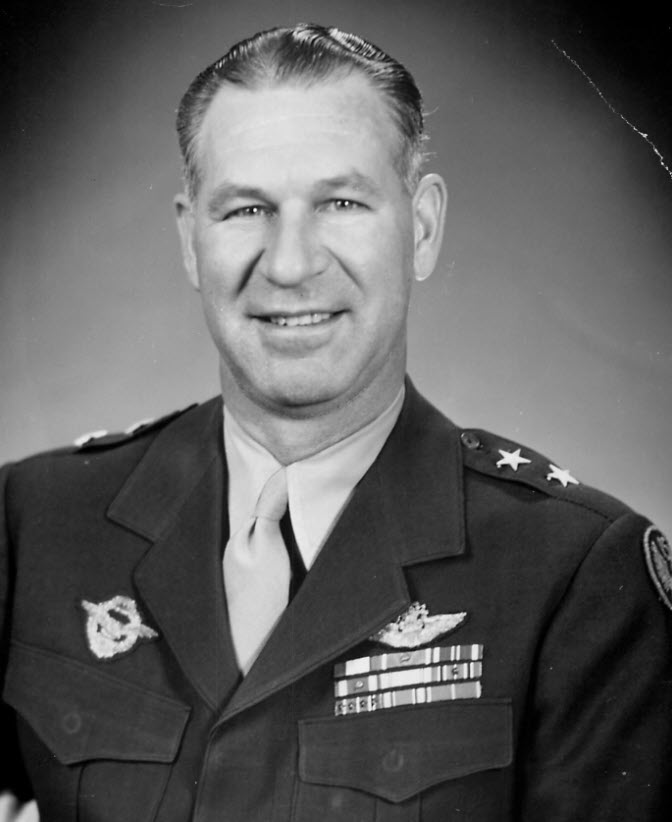
- Major General Charles F. Born
- Born: April 24, 1903; Racine, Wisconsin, United States
- Died: May 24, 1979 (aged 76); Phoenix, Arizona, United States
- Burial place: West Point Cemetery
- Military career
- Allegiance: United States
- Branch: United States Army; United States Army Air Corps; United States Army Air Forces; United States Air Force
- Service years: 1928–1934 (Army); 1934–1941 (Army Air Corps); 1941–1947 (Army Air Forces); 1947–1955 (Air Force)
- Rank: Major general
- Nickname: "Charley"
- Commands: 50th Observation Squadron; Antilles Air Command; II Bomber Command; Continental Air Forces; Second Air Force; Tactical Air Command; United States Air Forces in Europe; Air Training Command
- Conflicts: World War II; Berlin Airlift

Charles Franklin Born (April 24, 1903 – May 24, 1979) was a major general in the United States Air Force and an All-American football player.

== Early life and education ==
Born was born in Racine, Wisconsin, to Frank and Martha (née: Madera) Born. His father was born in Germany, and was a city of Racine fireman. He had two younger brothers, Captain Howard and Admiral Arthur S. Born, who were naval officers, and a younger sister, Grace. He graduated from St. John's Military Academy in 1924, where he was chosen as honor graduate, and West Point in 1928. On May 4, 1949, in Arlington, Virginia, he married the former Miss Eleanor Mae Moller. He died on May 24, 1979, in Phoenix, Arizona, and was buried in West Point Cemetery. With his first wife, Florence née: Fountain, he had 3 children; Charles Jr., JoAnne, and Charlotte. His brothers are buried in Arlington National Cemetery.

=== United States Military Academy ===
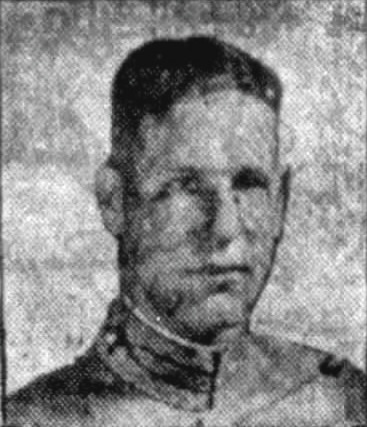
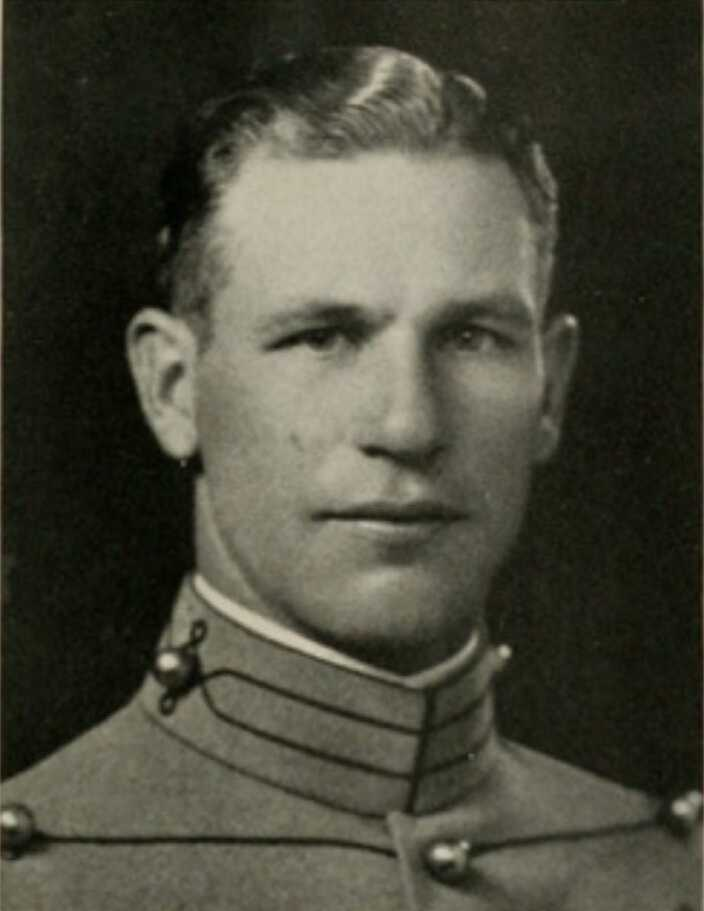
Portrait photographs of Born as a student at the United States Military Academy
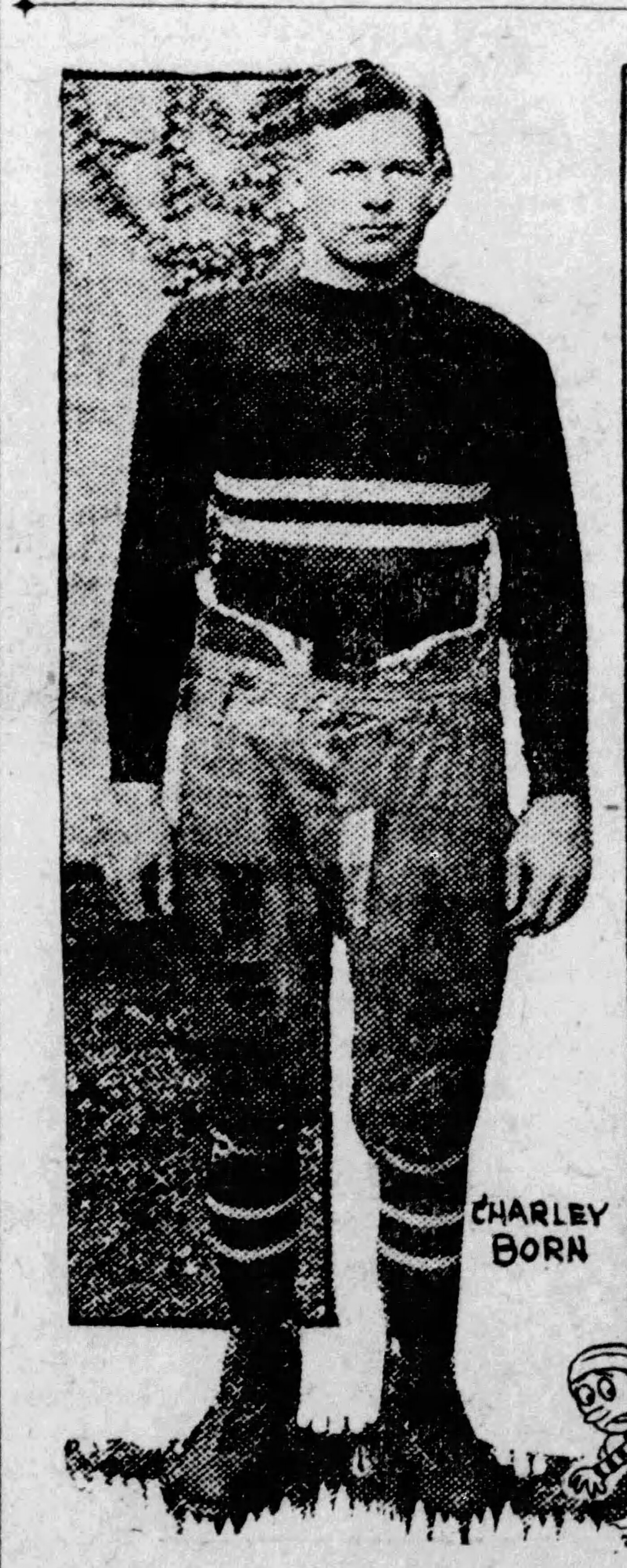
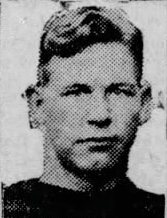
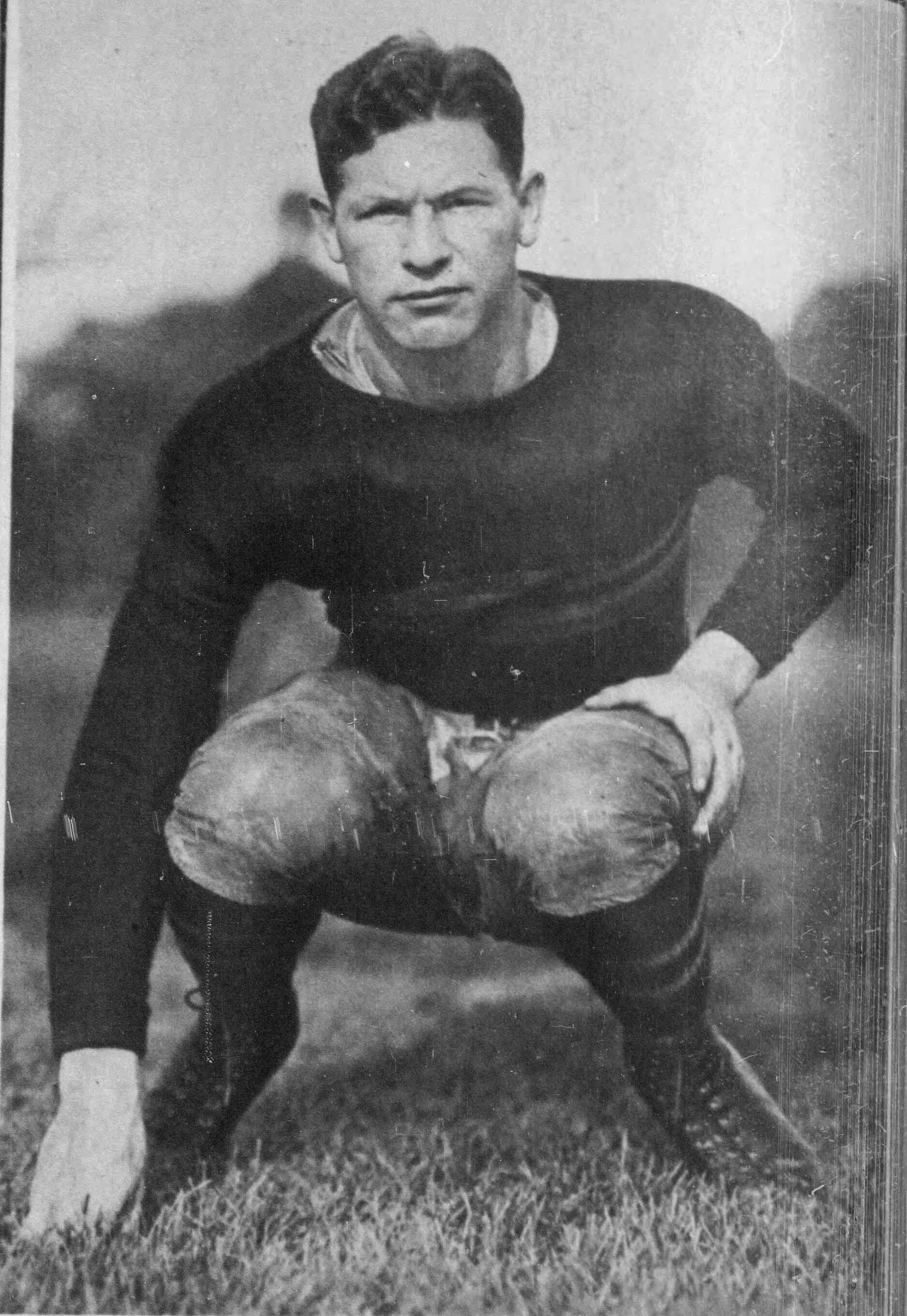
Portrait photographs of Born during his days of playing football at the United States Military Academy

Born graduated from the United States Military Academy in 1928. While there, he was an All-American member of the Army Black Knights football and lacrosse team. He was also a member of the ice hockey team. He was selected as a first-team end by the All-America Board for the 1925 College Football All-America Team. He was also named a second-team All-American by the Associated Press.

During the 1926 football season, the 6 feet (1.8 m) tall Born weighed 172 pounds (78 kg) and played left guard. After Army defeated the Yale Bulldogs in 1926, Yale coach Tad Jones hailed Born as one of the greatest ends he had ever witnessed play football. In the highly-publicized 1926 Army–Navy Game, attention was given to the fact that Born and his brother Arthur were playing for the opposing military academy teams (with Arthur playing for Navy).

== Military career ==
Upon graduation he was assigned to the Cavalry. In 1934, he transferred to the Air Corps. He was given command of the 50th Observation Squadron in 1936. In 1937, he was named an instructor at the United States Military Academy. During World War II, he took command of the Antilles Air Command and assistant chief of staff for operations and training of the Northwest African Strategic Air Force before being named assistant chief of staff for operations and training and eventually deputy commander of the Fifteenth Air Force. Following the war, he was given command of the Second Air Force and the Fifteenth Air Force. In 1947, he was appointed chief of staff of Tactical Air Command. Later, he would become deputy chief of staff for operations of the United States Air Forces in Europe. In 1951, he was named deputy for operations of Air Training Command. His retirement was effective as of January 1, 1955.

=== Assignments ===
- 1928-XX-XX – 1933-XX-XX – Lieutenant, US Army, 4th Cavalry Regiment, Fort Meade, South Dakota
- 1933-02-XX – 1933-XX-XX – Pilot trainee, Air Corps Primary Flying School, Randolph Field, Texas
- 1933-XX-XX – 1934-02-XX – Student, Air Corps Advanced Flying School, Kelly Field, Texas
- 1934-02-XX – 1934-04-XX – 72nd Bombardment Squadron, Luke Field, Hawaii
- 1934-08-XX – 1936-XX-XX – Assistant Supply Officer, Assistant Engineering Officer, Luke Field, Hawaii
- 1936-XX-XX – 1937-06-XX – Commanding Officer, 50th Observation Squadron, Luke Field, Hawaii
- 1937-06-XX – 1939-05-XX – Instructor, general military law, U.S. Military Academy, West Point, New York
- 1939-05-XX – 1939-08-XX – Student, Air Corps Tactical School, Maxwell Field, Alabama
- 1939-08-XX – 1940-06-XX – Instructor, general military law, U.S. Military Academy, West Point, New York
- 1940-06-XX – 1941-08-XX – Commanding Officer, 5th Bombardment Squadron, Mitchel Field, New York
- 1941-08-XX – 1941-12-XX – Commanding Officer, 9th Bombardment Group, Rio Hato, Panama
- 1941-12-XX – 1942-05-XX – Operations Officer, VI Interceptor Command, Borinquen Field, Puerto Rico
- 1942-08-21 – 1942-10-07 – Commanding Officer 36th Fighter Command, Borinquen Field, Puerto Rico
- 1942-10-08 – 1942-10-16 – Commanding Officer 25th Bombardment Group, Borinquen Field, Puerto Rico
- 1942-10-17 – 1943-05-11 – Commander Trinidad Detachment, 6th Fighter Command, Antilles Air Task Force, Borinquen Field, Puerto Rico
- 1943-05-20 – 1943-06-30 – Commanding General Trinidad Detachment, Antilles Air Task Force, Borinquen Field, Puerto Rico
- 1943-05-20 – 1943-06-30 – Commanding General 6th Fighter Command, Antilles Air Task Force, Borinquen Field, Puerto Rico
- 1943-07-29 – 1943-09-30 – Assistant Chief of Staff for Operations & Training (A-3), II Bomber Command, Hq 2nd Air Force, Spokane, Washington
- 1943-10-01 – 1944-10-07 – Assistant Chief of Staff for Operations & Training (A-3), 15th Air Force, Tunis, Tunisia, Italy
- 1944-10-08 – 1945-03-07 – Deputy Commanding General, 15th Air Force, Tunis, Tunisia, Italy
- 1945-04-XX – 1945-11-25 – Assistant Chief of Staff for Operations & Training, Continental Air Forces, Bolling Field, Washington D.C.
- 1945-09-07 – 1945-12-31 – Director of Separation, Continental Air Forces, Bolling Field, Washington D.C.
- 1945-11-26 – 1946-03-16 – Chief of Staff, Continental Air Forces, Bolling Field, Washington D.C.
- 1946-03-19 – 1946-03-31 – Commanding General, 2nd Air Force, Colorado Springs AAB, Colorado
- 1946-03-31 – 1947-04-15 – Commanding General 15th Air Force, Colorado Springs AAB, Colorado
- 1947-04-21 – 1947-09-03 – Chief of Staff, Tactical Air Command, Langley AFB, Virginia
- 1947-09-04 – 1948-10-03 – Deputy Commanding General Indoctrination Division, Air Training Command, Lackland AFB, Texas
- 1947-09-04 – 1948-10-03 – Chief of Staff, Indoctrination Division, Air Training Command, Lackland AFB, Texas
- 1948-10-16 – 1949-04-07 – Commanding General of the Indoctrination Division, Air Training Command, Lackland AFB, Texas
- 1949-05-01 – 1951-01-11 – Deputy Chief of Staff for Operations, US Air Forces in Europe, Wiesbaden, Germany
- 1951-01-26 – 1952-11-XX – Deputy Chief of Staff for Operations, Air Training Command, Scott AFB, Illinois
- 1952-11-01 – 1953-08-XX – Commanding General 3600th Flying Training Wing, Luke AFB, Arizona
- 1953-08-XX – 1953-10-XX – Vice Commanding General Crew Training Air Force, Air Training Command, Randolph AFB, Texas
- 1953-10-XX – 1955-01-01 – Commanding General Crew Training Air Force, Air Training Command, Randolph AFB, Texas
- 1955-01-01 – Retired

Awards he received include the Distinguished Service Medal, the Legion of Merit with two oak leaf clusters, the Distinguished Flying Cross, and the Air Medal with oak leaf cluster. Born was also an honorary Knight Commander of the Order of the Bath of the United Kingdom.

== Decorations ==
Command pilot
Army Distinguished Service Medal
Air Force Distinguished Service Medal
Legion of Merit with two Oak Leaf Clusters
Distinguished Flying Cross
Air Medal with Oak Leaf Cluster
American Defense Service Medal
American Campaign Medal
European-African-Middle Eastern Campaign Medal with four Oak Leaf Clusters
World War II Victory Medal
Army of Occupation Medal with Berlin Airlift Device
Medal for Humane Action
Croix de Guerre 1939–1945 with Palm (France)
Knight Commander of the Order of the Bath (United Kingdom)
Knight Commander of the Order of the British Empire (United Kingdom)
