= Ralph H. Spanjer =

United States Marine Corps general

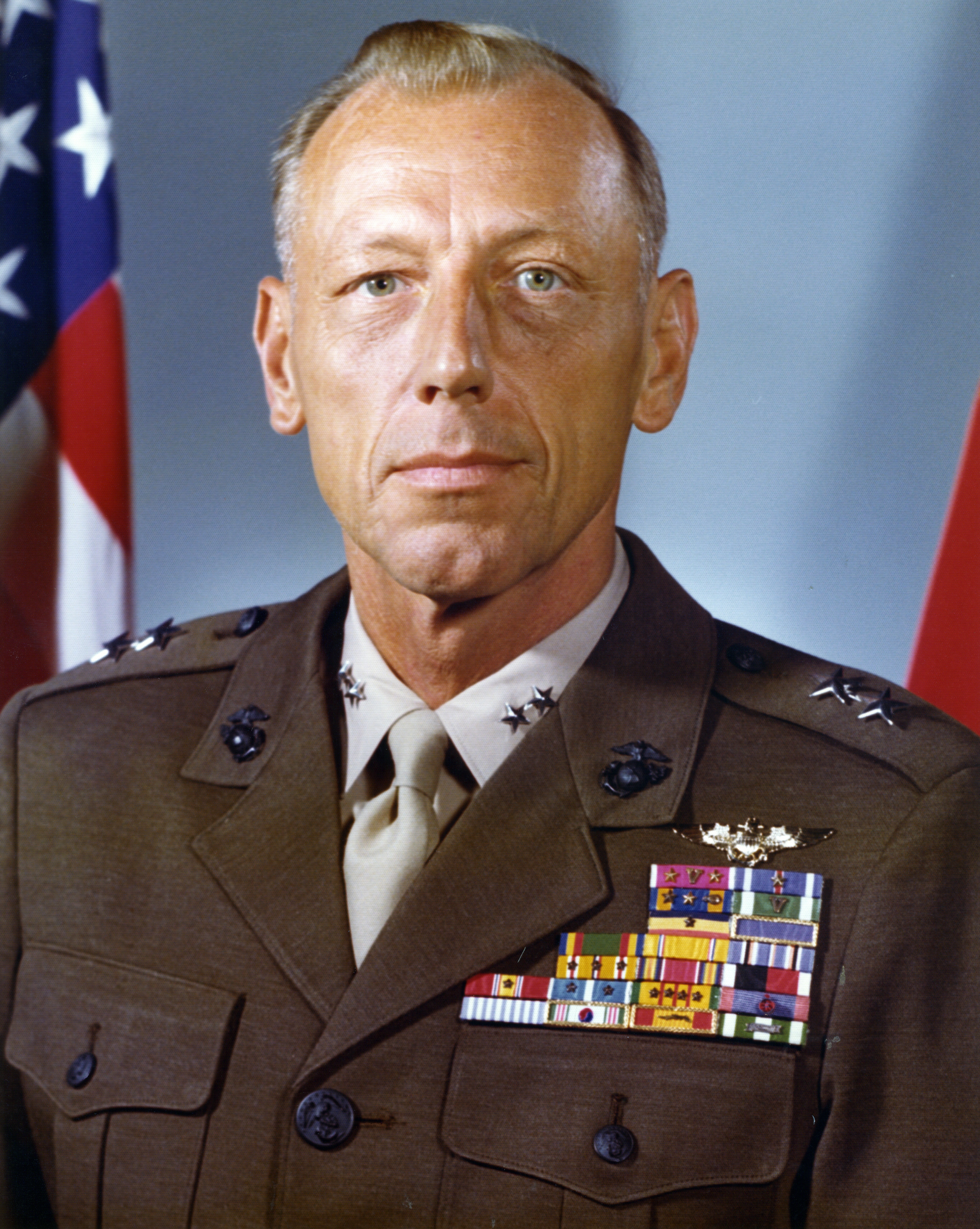
- Born: Ralph H. Spanjer; September 20, 1920; Hillside, New Jersey, U.S.
- Died: February 8, 1999 (aged 78); Delafield, Wisconsin, U.S.
- Military career
- Allegiance: United States of America
- Branch: United States Marine Corps
- Service years: 1941–1978
- Rank: Major general
- Commands: Deputy Commander, Fleet Marine Force, Atlantic; 2nd Marine Aircraft Wing
- Conflicts: World War II; Korean War; Vietnam War
- Awards: Legion of Merit (3); Distinguished Flying Cross (2); Air Medal (4)

Ralph H. Spanjer (September 20, 1920 – February 8, 1999) was a major general in the United States Marine Corps. He went on to serve as superintendent of the Marine Military Academy in Harlingen, Texas, and president of St. John's Northwestern Military Academy in Delafield, Wisconsin.

== Biography ==
Spanjer was born on September 20, 1920, in Hillside, New Jersey, the youngest of eight children. He would attend New York University. Spanjer would also marry three times and had three children, as well as a stepson. He died of cancer at his home in Delafield, Wisconsin, on February 8, 1999.

== Career ==
After originally joining the United States Navy in 1941, Spanjer joined the United States Marine Corps Reserve in 1942. He went on to serve as a fighter pilot in World War II. During that time, he was awarded the Distinguished Flying Cross for his actions in the Pacific Theater of Operations.

During the Korean War, he flew missions with pilots that included John Glenn, who later became the first American to orbit Earth in space and a U.S. Senator. Spanjer was awarded a second Distinguished Flying Cross for his actions during the war.

Spanjer flew helicopters during the Vietnam War, serving in assault landings and medical evacuations. During the final years of the war, he served in other high-ranking positions. He was twice awarded the Legion of Merit, including one with a Combat Valor device, during his service in the Vietnam War.

He was awarded a third Legion of Merit before retiring from the Marine Corps.

Spanjer served as superintendent of the Marine Military Academy for six years. After stops in North Carolina and Alaska, he accepted the position of president of St. John's Northwestern Military Academy in 1994. During his tenure, he oversaw a $5 million renovation, the merger of the academy with Northwestern Military and Naval Academy in Lake Geneva, Wisconsin, and organized a visit by former U.S. President George H. W. Bush.

== Awards and decorations ==
During his military career he was awarded:

Naval Aviator insignia
1st row	Legion of Merit with two Gold Stars and "V" Device		Distinguished Flying Cross with Gold Star	Air Medal with three silver award stars
2nd row	Navy Commendation Medal with "V" Device	Navy Presidential Unit Citation with one Star	Army Presidential Unit Citation with Oak Leaf Cluster	American Defense Service Medal
3rd row	American Campaign Medal	Asiatic-Pacific Campaign Medal with four Service Stars	World War II Victory Medal	Navy Occupation Service Medal
4th row	National Defense Service Medal with one Star	Korean Service Medal with two Service Stars	Armed Forces Expeditionary Medal	Vietnam Service Medal with four Service Stars
5th row	Presidential Unit Citation (Korea)	Vietnam Gallantry Cross Unit Citation	United Nations Korea Medal	Vietnam Campaign Medal
