= Thomas Cebern Musgrave Jr. =

United States Air Force general

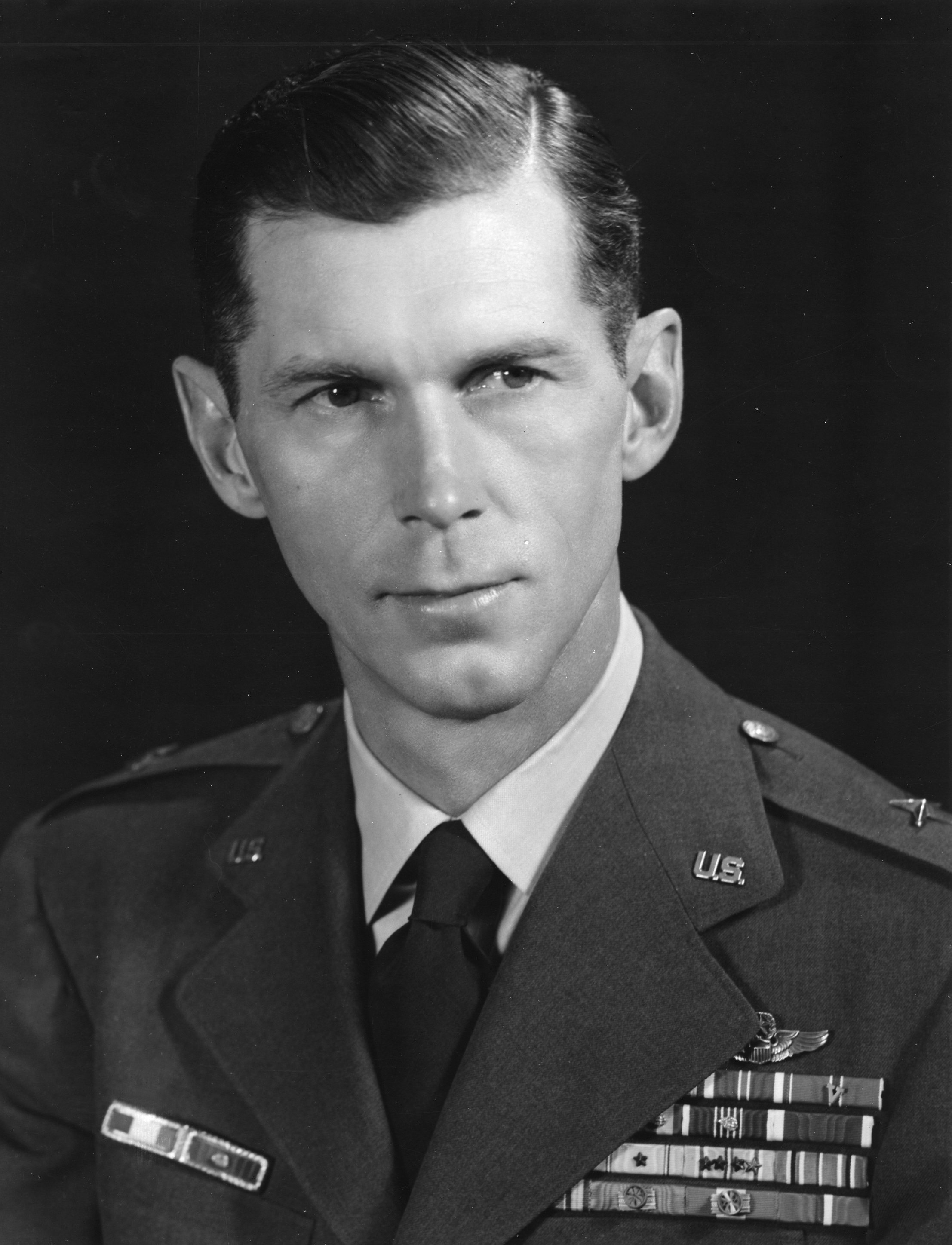
Maj. Gen. Thomas Cebern Musgrave

Thomas Cebern Musgrave Jr. (July 5, 1913 – November 14, 2005) was a major general in the United States Air Force.

== Biography ==
Musgrave was born in Washington, D.C., in 1913. He was the son of Col Thomas Cebern Musgrave Sr (Feb 27 1880 – Mar 11 1962) and Olivia Van Patten Dodge (July 17, 1882 – Aug 30 1969). He was the grandson of Philip Tell Dodge, the first president of the Mergenthaler Linotype Company. He married Josephine Bennett (Apr 16 1913 – Dec 20 1999), the granddaughter of the famous Texas Ranger John Barclay Armstrong. They had one daughter, Jamie Musgrave Hall (Sep 18 1938 – Dec 26 2008), and one son, Thomas Cebern Musgrave III (Sep 3 1942 – ). He died on November 14, 2005, in Washington D.C.

== Career ==
Musgrave was educated at St. John's Military Academy before entering the United States Military Academy, graduating in 1935. During World War II he served with the Thirteenth Air Force. Following the war he became Executive Office to the Commanding General of the United States Army Air Forces. In 1949 he entered the National War College. Following graduation he was given command of the 47th Air Division and the 7th Air Division. In 1955 he was assigned to NATO. The following year he was named Director of Manpower and Organization of the Air Force. His retirement was effective as of June 1, 1962.

Musgrave was wounded in action over the Caroline Islands on April 22, 1944. He was hospitalized until Aug. 15 and then resumed command of the Fifth Bomb Group, 13th Air Force. On September 30, 1944, Colonel Musgrave led the first in a series of five air raids against the oil refineries at Balikpapan from the recently captured Noemfoor Island. Without fighter cover, the raid suffered severe and unsustainable losses of its B-24 Liberators.

Awards he received include the Legion of Merit, the Bronze Star Medal, the Distinguished Flying Cross, and the Air Medal with two oak leaf clusters.

After retiring from the US Air Force, Musgrave became a Vice President of Textron Corp and served on the Board of Directors of All American Engineering Co.
