= Sankar Montoute =

American football player (born 1951)

No. 55, 56
- Position: Linebacker

Personal information
- Born: February 2, 1961 (age 65); Trinidad, West Indies Federation
- Listed height: 6 ft 3 in (1.91 m)
- Listed weight: 230 lb (104 kg)

Career information
- High school: St. John's Military Academy (Delafield, Wisconsin, U.S.)
- College: Wisconsin (1979–1980); Saint Leo (1981–1984) (Note: Montoute played only basketball at Saint Leo, as they do not have a football team.)

Career history
- Kansas City Chiefs (1984)*; Tampa Bay Bandits (1985); Edmonton Eskimos (1987)*; Tampa Bay Buccaneers (1987)
- * Offseason or practice squad member only

Career statistics
- Sacks: 1.5
- Interceptions: 1
- Stats at Pro Football Reference

Sankar Jerome Montoute (born February 2, 1961) is a Trinidadian former professional player of American football who was a linebacker for one season in the National Football League (NFL) for the Tampa Bay Buccaneers. Born in Trinidad, he moved to New York City as a child and attended St. John's Military Academy in Wisconsin. He played college football for the Wisconsin Badgers before transferring to Saint Leo University, where he played three years of college basketball. He joined the Kansas City Chiefs as an undrafted free agent in 1984 and after a brief stint there, played for the Tampa Bay Bandits of the United States Football League (USFL) in 1985. He was a member of the Edmonton Eskimos of the Canadian Football League (CFL) for part of 1987 before joining the Buccaneers later that year as a replacement player.

== Early life ==
Montoute was born on February 2, 1961, in Trinidad. He is one of only five National Football League (NFL) players from Trinidad and Tobago as well as the first. He is of Indian descent and his name, Sankar, refers to the Hindu god of destruction Shiva. His father died when he was young and his mother moved the family to New York City to live with relatives.

Montoute played pickup basketball in New York City and his talent in the sport led to him receiving a scholarship to attend St. John's Military Academy in Delafield, Wisconsin. At St. John's, he became a standout in three sports: basketball, football and track and field. He became a starter in both basketball and football as a sophomore and went on to win all-state honors in all three sports he competed in.

As a senior, Montoute led both the football and basketball teams to state championship appearances and won a state track championship as a member of the 800m relay team. He was the team captain in basketball and set a school record for career rebounds, being named all-conference, all-county, all-state, all-tournament and the team MVP. He also won all-state and all-conference honors in football that year. Montoute was named the school's most valuable athlete in May 1979. He accepted a scholarship offer to play college football for the Wisconsin Badgers after he graduated from high school.

== College career ==
Montoute began his freshman year at Wisconsin on the scout team before being promoted to second-string free safety near the end of the 1979 season. He then was a backup linebacker for the Badgers in 1980, but missed a portion of the season due to injury.

Following two seasons with the Wisconsin football team, Montoute transferred to Saint Leo University in Florida to play for the basketball team, which was led by his former high school coach Gary Richert. He started three years with the NCAA Division II-level Saint Leo Lions, being a top defender and rebounder while playing forward. He was among the Sunshine State Conference leaders in scoring and rebounding as a junior, with averages of 11 points and eight rebounds per game, and was named second-team All-South for his performance. He scored less points as a senior in 1983–84 but still led the team in rebounding, finishing his collegiate career in the school's top 10 in that category. He graduated from Saint Leo's with a bachelor's degree in marketing.

== Professional career ==
Despite having been out of football for the prior three years, Montoute signed with the NFL's Kansas City Chiefs following the 1984 NFL draft to play linebacker. He was injured in preseason camp and placed on injured reserve prior to the 1984 season, on August 13, 1984, later being released on August 29. On December 11, 1984, he signed a free agent contract with the Tampa Bay Bandits of the United States Football League (USFL). After competing for a roster spot with the Bandits, Montoute was placed on the inactive squad to begin the 1985 season. He later was activated and recorded his first USFL start against the Orlando Renegades on June 1, 1985. He became a free agent in August 1986 when the USFL folded.

Montoute signed with the Edmonton Eskimos of the Canadian Football League (CFL) for the 1987 season. He was placed on the practice roster on July 2, to open the season, but was later released on July 7. He later said that joining the Eskimos was a mistake: "I made a bad choice. I should have waited around for a better offer, but I was so anxious to get the show on the road. Once I got up there, I didn't like the brand of football, I was cold, and homesick." Following his release, he returned to Florida and decided to take a job with the local sheriff's department.

When the National Football League Players Association (NFLPA) went on strike during the 1987 NFL season, teams assembled rosters of replacement players and the local Tampa Bay Buccaneers gave Montoute an offer. He signed on September 22, 1987, and made his NFL debut against the Detroit Lions in Week 4, posting four tackles and a half-sack. He was, at the time, the only Trinidadian NFL player, as well as the only one from Saint Leo University, which did not have a football team. In his second game, against the San Diego Chargers, he recorded two tackles. In his third and last game, against the Minnesota Vikings, he had a sack and an interception. He was released, along with the vast majority of the other replacements, at the end of the strike.

== Later life ==
After being released by the Buccaneers, Montoute became a police officer. He had an offer to sign with the Buccaneers again in 1988, but declined it to stay at his job. He rose to the position of major, overseeing homeland security for the Hillsborough County Sheriff's Office. In addition to being in command of about 75 officers in his department, he also supervised the 50 officers tasked with securing Buccaneers games. Montoute married and had two sons who worked with him in the county sheriff's office.
