= St. John's Northwestern Military Academy =

St. John's Northwestern
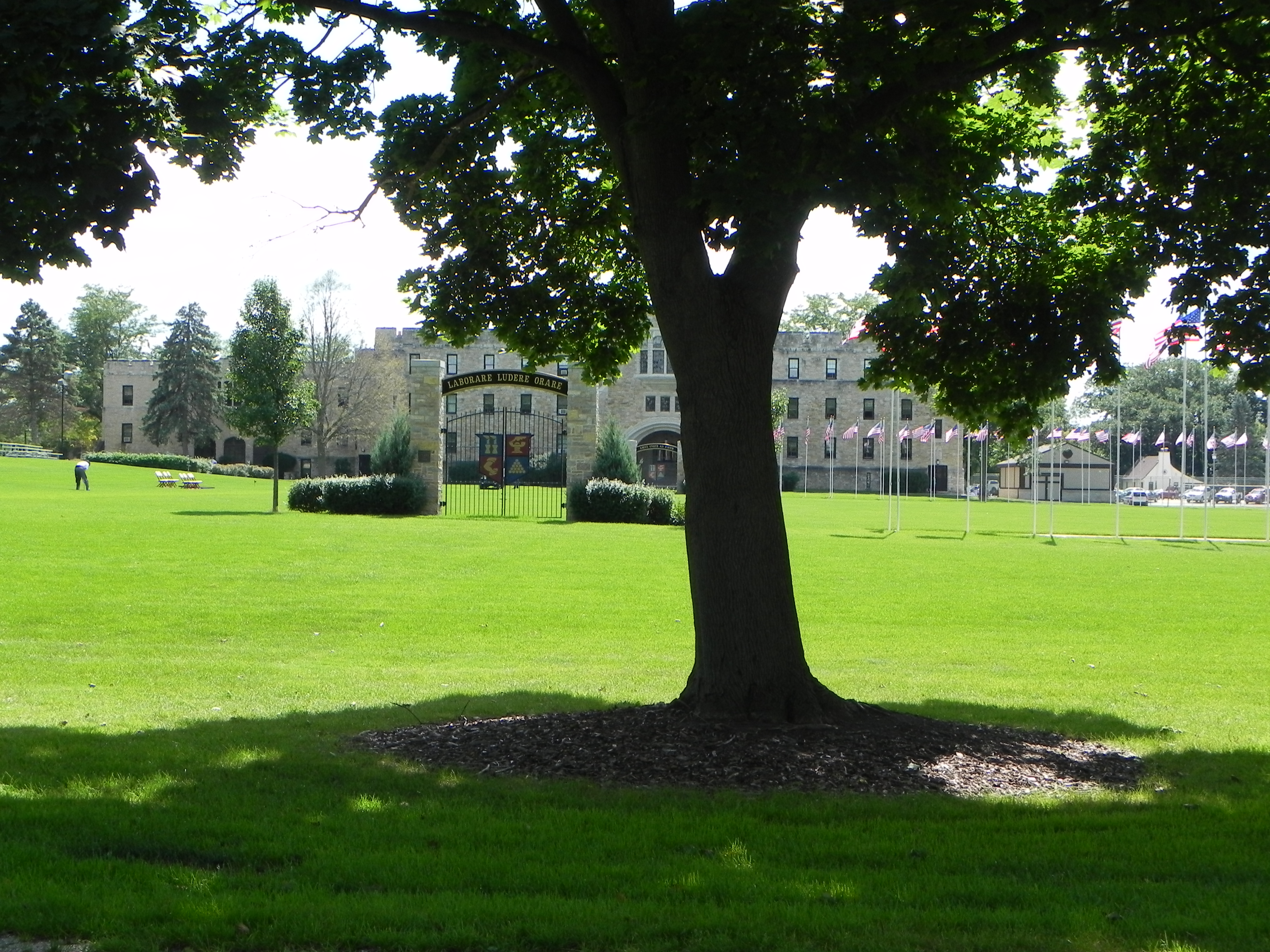
- 1101 Genesee St. Delafield, Wisconsin; United States

Information
- Type: Coed Independent Boarding and Day School
- Motto: Laborare, Ludere, Orare(Work Hard, Play Hard, Pray Hard)
- Established: 1884
- President: Michael J. Fink
- Grades: 7–12
- Enrollment: 238
- Colors: Red, Black, White and Purple
- Athletics: FALL SPORTS: Football, Soccer, Cross Country, JROTC Raiders, F-Tennis WINTER SPORTS: Basketball, Wrestling, Precision Air Rifle, NASP Archery SPRING SPORTS: Baseball, Golf, Tennis, SCTP Trap and Clays, JROTC Drill Team (Silver Rifles)
- Team name: Lancers

St. John's Northwestern Academy (SJNA) was founded in 1884 as St. John's Military Academy (SJMA) in Delafield, Wisconsin, by clergyman Sidney T. Smythe as a private, college preparatory school. In 1995, Northwestern Military and Naval Academy (NMNA) in Lake Geneva, Wisconsin, merged with St. John's Military Academy to become St. John's Northwestern Military Academy on the Delafield campus. In 2020, a Leadership Academy was added, and the combined schools became St. John's Northwestern Academies, and in 2026 it was simplified to St. John's Northwestern (SJN). It is today a coed independent boarding and day school for boys and girls in grades 7–12.

== Historic buildings ==
St. John's Northwestern campus consists of a collection of historic buildings, many with towers and battlements in a style that suggests a medieval castle, with most of them arranged in a U around the drill field.

- The school's oldest surviving building is the odd Shingle style Memorial Hall, designed by John A. Moller with its two caps and built in 1893 as a recreational building/gymnasium.
- Next among the surviving buildings is DeKoven Hall, designed in Collegiate Gothic style by Thomas Van Alyea and built in 1906, a four-story barracks/administration building with octagonal towers at the corners and battlements topping the walls.
- The dining hall and barracks Welles Hall was also added in 1906, designed by Van Alyea in a style similar to DeKoven Hall, but with a large square clock tower.
- The Beacon is a fieldstone monument built in 1923. It holds an eternal light and displays quotes from St. John's founder.
- Victory Memorial Chapel of St. John Divine was built from 1921 to 1926, modeled by Van Alyea on the chapel at West Point, and clad in lannonstone.
- In 1927 the school added the two-story Hazelwood Hall designed by Van Alyea, housing barracks and classrooms, and it was expanded with Scott Johnston Hall in 1930, with a corner turret.
- Smythe Hall was added in 1929, a dormitory designed by Van Alyea in a "castle" style like the previous buildings.

In 1977 these historic campus buildings were listed on the National Register of Historic Places for the complementary design of many of them and since the school is the oldest military academy in Wisconsin.

== Notable faculty ==
William A. Shunk – professor of military science and tactics from 1904 to 1908

== Notable alumni ==
- Ehab Amin — basketball player
- Harold Huntley Bassett — United States Air Force major general
- Ralph Barnes — journalist
- Ed Bearss — United States Marine Corps veteran
- Roman R. Blenski — Wisconsin state politician
- Arthur S. Born (SJMA, 1923) — United States Navy rear admiral
- Charles F. Born (SJMA, 1924) — United States Air Force major general
- Eliot Bostar — member of the Nebraska Legislature
- Martin Breunig — basketball player
- Donald Clough Cameron — writer of detective novels and comic books
- Jack Carson — actor
- Theodore Case — chemist, physicist, inventor of the Movietone sound system
- Ahmad Caver (born 1996) — basketball player in the Israeli Basketball Premier League who played for the Memphis Hustle
- John M. Cavey — Wisconsin state politician
- Tom T. Chamales (SJMA, 1942) — writer and veteran of U.S. Army's Merrill's Marauders
- Edward A. Craig (SJMA 1917) — U.S. Marine Corps officer who commanded combat units during World War II and the Korean War
- Darroll DeLaPorte — football player in the Milwaukee Badgers
- Donald Freed — playwright, novelist, teacher and activist
- Daniel Gerber (SJMA 1916) — founder and president of Gerber Baby Foods
- Nick Gravenites — blues, rock and folk singer for Electric Flag
- John A. Hazelwood — Wisconsin state politician
- Reggie Hayes — actor, screenwriter and director
- Trévon Hughes (2006) — basketball player in the Israeli National League
- George Kennan (SJMA 1922) — U.S. Ambassador to the USSR (1952) and Yugoslavia; helped develop the Marshall Plan for reconstruction of Europe after World War II
- Monte Merkel — football player for the Chicago Bears
- Frank Merrill (SJMA 1967) — equestrian
- Sankar Montoute — football player for the Tampa Bay Buccaneers
- Edward Moore — music critic for the Chicago Tribune
- Alex Moyer — football player for the Miami Dolphins
- Thomas Cebern Musgrave Jr. — United States Air Force major general
- Brandin Podziemski —basketball player for the Golden State Warriors
- Adam Rapp — novelist, playwright, musician and film director
- Frank C. Rathje (SJMA) — honorary degree (1959), Chicago banker and lawyer
- Jack Riley — football player for the Boston Redskins
- Curtis Roosevelt (NMNA 1948) — eldest grandson of President Franklin D. Roosevelt; statesman who served as a delegate representing the United States to the United Nations
- Daniel Rostenkowski (SJMA 1946) — Illinois Democratic leader in the U.S. House of Representatives
- Walter G. Schindler — vice admiral in the United States Navy
- Tony Schumacher — award-winning drag racer
- Jayapataka Swami (Gordon John Erdman II, SJMA 1965) — Hare Krishna guru
- Martín Torrijos (SJMA 1981) — President of Panama
- Spencer Tracy (NMNA 1919–1920) — two-time Academy Award-winning actor
- Ty Warner (SJMA 1962) — CEO and founder of Ty Inc., manufacturer of Beanie Babies
- Minor Watson — character actor known for films in the 1940s
- Harold J. Week — Wisconsin state politician
- Ronnie Williams — basketball player
- George Wilson (SJMA 1933) — NFL end with the Chicago Bears (1937–46), coached the Detroit Lions to the 1957 NFL Championship Game, later became the first coach of the Miami Dolphins
- Harry Wismer — sports broadcaster and the charter owner of the New York Titans (now the New York Jets)
- Cornelius T. Young — Wisconsin state politician
- Fred Young (SJMA 1960) — president and CEO of Young Radiator Company
- Tony Zielinski (SJMA 1979) — Wisconsin state politician
- James "Jay" Lovell III, son of U.S. Astronaut Jim Lovell

== In popular culture ==
The school was depicted in the Oscar-winning film Apollo 13, with scenes showing a young Jay Lovell, portrayed by Max Elliott Slade, as a cadet in a classroom watching broadcasts of his father – Jim Lovell – attempt to survive during the famed failed moon landing. While the young Lovell did watch the broadcasts including the splashdown, in reality he watched from the home of the St. John's commandant, not in the classroom surrounded by peers as depicted in the film.
