= Delafield, Wisconsin =

- City
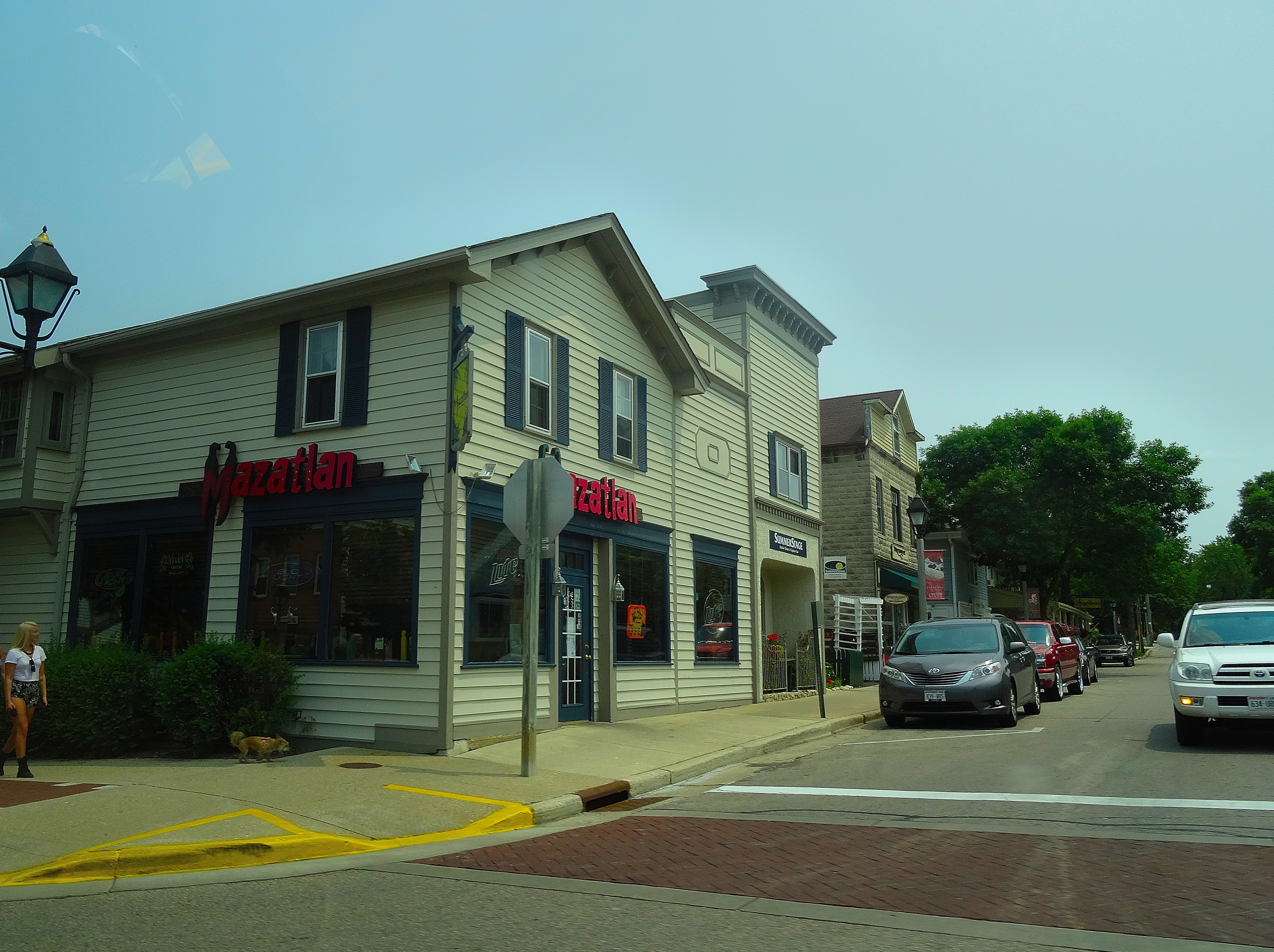
- Downtown Delafield

- Seal

- Location of Delafield in Waukesha County, Wisconsin.

- Location within Wisconsin Location within the United States
- Coordinates: 43°3′33″N 88°24′14″W
- Country: United States
- State: Wisconsin
- County: Waukesha
- Established: 1837
- Founder: Dr. Charles Delafield

Government
  - Type: Mayor – Common Council
  - Mayor: Tim Aicher

Area
  - Total: 11.07 sq mi (28.66 km^{2})
  - Land: 9.41 sq mi (24.37 km^{2})
  - Water: 1.66 sq mi (4.29 km^{2}) 14.92%

Population (2020)
  - Total: 7,185
  - Density: 764/sq mi (294.8/km^{2})
- ZIP Code: 53018
- Area code: 262
- FIPS code: 55-19400
- Website: https://www.cityofdelafieldwi.gov/

Delafield is a city in Waukesha County, Wisconsin, United States, along the Bark River. The population was 7,185 at the 2020 census. It is part of the Milwaukee metropolitan area.

The city of Delafield is a separate municipality from the Town of Delafield, both of which are situated in township 7 North Range 18 East.

== History ==
Delafield was established in 1837, named after Dr. Charles Delafield of Milwaukee. It was the hometown of the Cushing brothers, who served the Union cause during the American Civil War—Alonzo (killed during Pickett's Charge at Gettysburg), William (led the raid on CSS Albemarle), and Howard (an Indian fighter killed fighting the Apache in Arizona after the war). Cushing Memorial Park is named after them and is home to a war memorial in their honor, and Cushing Elementary is specifically named after Alonzo Cushing. Since 1927, a culinary event known as the "Coon Feed" has taken place in Delafield.

== Geography ==
Delafield is located in the Lake Country area of Waukesha County.

According to the United States Census Bureau, the city has a total area of 11.06 square miles (28.65 km^{2}), of which 9.41 square miles (24.37 km^{2}) is land and 1.65 square miles (4.27 km^{2}) is water.

== Demographics ==
Historical population
Census	Pop.	Note	%±
1880	183		—
1960	2,334		—
1970	3,182		36.3%
1980	4,083		28.3%
1990	5,347		31.0%
2000	6,472		21.0%
2010	7,085		9.5%
2020	7,185		1.4%
U.S. Decennial Census

=== 2010 census ===
As of the census of 2010, there were 7,085 people, 2,776 households, and 1,858 families living in the city. The population density was 752.9 inhabitants per square mile (290.7/km^{2}). There were 2,974 housing units at an average density of 316.0 per square mile (122.0/km^{2}). The racial makeup of the city was 96.4% White, 0.8% African American, 0.3% Native American, 1.3% Asian, 0.4% from other races, and 0.8% from two or more races. Hispanic or Latino of any race were 3.2% of the population.

There were 2,776 households, of which 29.7% had children under the age of 18 living with them, 56.3% were married couples living together, 7.0% had a female householder with no husband present, 3.6% had a male householder with no wife present, and 33.1% were non-families. Some 26.8% of all households were made up of individuals, and 11.2% had someone living alone who was 65 years of age or older. The average household size was 2.38 and the average family size was 2.92.

The median age in the city was 41.8 years. Around 25.2% of residents were under the age of 18; 7.6% were between the ages of 18 and 24; 21.8% were from 25 to 44; 32.4% were from 45 to 64; and 13% were 65 years of age or older. The gender makeup of the city was 50.9% male and 49.1% female.

=== 2000 census ===
As of the census of 2000, there were 6,472 people, 2,553 households, and 1,856 families living in the city. The population density was 680.2 people per square mile (262.5/km^{2}). There were 2,685 housing units at an average density of 282.2 per square mile (108.9/km^{2}). The racial makeup of the city was 97.74% White, 0.9% Black or African American, 0.31% Native American, 0.57% Asian, 0.32% from other races, and 0.96% from two or more races. Some 1.47% of the population were Hispanic or Latino of any race.

There were 2,553 households, out of which 35.8% had children under the age of 18 living with them. Around 61.7% were married couples living together, 8.0% had a female householder with no husband present, and 27.3% were non-families. About 22.2% of all households were made up of individuals, and 7.7% had someone living alone who was 65 years of age or older. The average household size was 2.52 and the average family size was 2.97.

In the city, the population was spread out, with 26.6% under the age of 18, 5.7% from 18 to 24, 29.8% from 25 to 44, 27.1% from 45 to 64, and 10.8% who were 65 years of age or older. The median age was 39 years. For every 100 females, there were 98.5 males. For every 100 females age 18 and over, there were 93.3 males.

The median income for a household in the city was $61,938, and the median income for a family was $71,955. Males had a median income of $51,656 versus $30,253 for females. The per capita income for the city was $31,602. About 2.3% of families and 3.4% of the population were below the poverty line, including 5.3% of those under age 18 and 1.4% of those age 65 or over.

== Education ==
The Kettle Moraine School District serves most of Delafield. Cushing Elementary provides education for children from kindergarten through 5th grade. Kettle Moraine Middle School and Kettle Moraine High School are the secondary schools of the Kettle Moraine district.

The Lake Country School District and Arrowhead Union High School District also serve parts of the community.

St. John's Northwestern Military Academy, a private Episcopal military school for 7th through 12th grade, is also located in Delafield.

== Notable people ==
- Alonzo Cushing, U.S. Army, Medal of Honor recipient
- William B. Cushing, U.S. Navy, Recipient of Thanks of Congress
- Cindi Duchow, Wisconsin State Assembly
- Emily Jashinsky, journalist and political commentator
- Monte Merkel, NFL player
- Zach Metsa, NHL player for the Buffalo Sabres
- Sankar Montoute, NFL player
- Alex Moyer, NFL player
- James Kerr Proudfit, Adjutant General of Wisconsin
- Alex Rigsby, woman's ice hockey player
- Ralph H. Spanjer, U.S. Marine Corps Major General
- George Wilson, NFL player, assistant coach and head coach
- Corey Jaskolski, National Geographic Explorer of the Year, Synthetaic Founder
