= Cindy Guntly Memorial Airport =

Airport in Wisconsin, United States of America

- IATA: none; ICAO: none; FAA LID: 62C

Summary
- Airport type: Public
- Owner: Community of Franksville
- Serves: Raymond, Wisconsin
- Opened: March 1962
- Time zone: CST (UTC−06:00)
  - Summer (DST): CDT (UTC−05:00)
- Elevation AMSL: 784 ft (239 m)
- Coordinates: 42°48′41″N 088°05′39″W

Map
- Location of airport in Wisconsin 62C (the United States)

Runways
Direction	Length		Surface
Direction	ft	m	Surface
1/19	2,381	726	Turf
18/36	1,239	378	Turf

Statistics
- Aircraft operations (2022): 6,700
- Based aircraft (2024): 34
- Source: Federal Aviation Administration

Cindy Guntly Memorial Airport (FAA LID: 62C), originally Hunt Field, is a privately owned public use airport located 7 miles (11 km) northwest of the central business district of Franksville, a neighborhood of the village of Caledonia, in Racine County, Wisconsin, United States.

Although most U.S. airports use the same three-letter location identifier for the FAA and IATA, this airport is assigned 62C by the FAA but has no designation from the IATA.

The airport is named in honor of the owner's wife, Cindy Guntly, who was involved in a fatal car accident in 1986.

== Facilities and aircraft ==
Cindy Guntly Memorial Airport covers an area of 15 acres (6.1 ha) at an elevation of 784 feet (239 m) above mean sea level. It has two runways: 1/19 is 2,381 by 70 feet (726 x 21 m) with a turf surface; 18/36 is 1,239 by 80 feet (378 x 24 m), also with a turf surface.

For the 12-month period ending June 2, 2022, the airport had 6,700 aircraft operations: all general aviation. In July 2024, there were 34 aircraft based at this airport: 30 single-engine, 1 helicopter and 3 ultra-light.

== See also ==
- List of airports in Wisconsin
