= Burlington Municipal Airport =

Burlington Municipal Airport may refer to:

- Burlington Municipal Airport (Wisconsin), serving Burlington, Wisconsin, United States
- Burlington Municipal Airport (Massachusetts), a former airport serving Burlington, Massachusetts, United States
- Burlington International Airport (formerly Burlington Municipal Airport) serving Burlington, Vermont, United States

== See also ==
- Burlington Airport (disambiguation)
