= List of airports in Wisconsin =

This is a list of airports in Wisconsin (a U.S. state), grouped by type and sorted by location. It contains all public-use and military airports in the state. Some private-use and former airports may be included where notable, such as airports that were previously public-use, those with commercial enplanements recorded by the FAA or airports assigned an IATA airport code.

== Airports ==
This list contains the following information:

- **City served** – The city generally associated with the airport, as per the airport's master record with the Federal Aviation Administration. This is not always the actual location since some airports are located in smaller towns outside of the city they serve. It is not meant to be a complete list of cities served, which can be found in or added to each airport's Wikipedia article.
- **FAA** – The location identifier assigned by the Federal Aviation Administration (FAA).
- **IATA** – The airport code assigned by the International Air Transport Association (IATA). Those that do not match the FAA code are shown in bold.
- **ICAO** – The location indicator assigned by the International Civil Aviation Organization (ICAO).
- **Airport name** – The official airport name. Those shown in **bold** indicate the airport has scheduled passenger service on commercial airlines.
- **Role** – One of four FAA airport categories, as per the 2025–2029 National Plan of Integrated Airport Systems (NPIAS) report:
  - P-s: Commercial service – primary are publicly owned airports that receive scheduled passenger service and have more than 10,000 passenger boardings (enplanements) each year. Each primary airport is sub-classified by the FAA as one of the following four "hub" types (s):
    - L: Large hub that accounts for at least 1% of total U.S. passenger enplanements.
    - M: Medium hub that accounts for between 0.25% and 1% of total U.S. passenger enplanements.
    - S: Small hub that accounts for between 0.05% and 0.25% of total U.S. passenger enplanements.
    - N: Nonhub that accounts for less than 0.05% of total U.S. passenger enplanements, but more than 10,000 annual enplanements.
  - CS: Commercial service – nonprimary are publicly owned airports that receive scheduled passenger service and have at least 2,500 passenger boardings each year.
  - R: Reliever airports are designated by the FAA to relieve congestion at a large commercial service airport and to provide more general aviation access to the overall community.
  - GA: General aviation airports are the largest single group of airports in the U.S. airport system. They are public-use airports that do not have scheduled service or have scheduled service with less than 2,500 passenger boardings each year.
- **Enplanements** – The number of enplanements (commercial passenger boardings) that occurred at the airport in calendar year 2024, as per FAA records.

City served	FAA	IATA	ICAO	Airport name	Role	Enplanements (2024)
				**Commercial service – primary airports**		
Appleton / Fox Cities	ATW	ATW	KATW	**Appleton International Airport**	P-S	540,349
Eau Claire	EAU	EAU	KEAU	**Chippewa Valley Regional Airport**	P-N	22,289
Green Bay	GRB	GRB	KGRB	**Green Bay–Austin Straubel International Airport**	P-N	338,127
La Crosse	LSE	LSE	KLSE	**La Crosse Regional Airport**	P-N	40,608
Madison	MSN	MSN	KMSN	**Dane County Regional Airport** (Truax Field)	P-S	1,156,399
Milwaukee	MKE	MKE	KMKE	**Milwaukee Mitchell International Airport**	P-M	3,104,054
Mosinee	CWA	CWA	KCWA	**Central Wisconsin Airport**	P-N	90,087
Rhinelander	RHI	RHI	KRHI	**Rhinelander–Oneida County Airport**	P-N	24,826
				**Reliever airports**		
Brookfield	02C			Capitol Airport	R	
Kenosha	ENW	ENW	KENW	Kenosha Regional Airport	R	
Milwaukee	MWC	MWC	KMWC	Lawrence J. Timmerman Airport	R	
Racine	RAC	RAC	KRAC	Batten International Airport	R	
Waukesha	UES	UES	KUES	Waukesha County Airport (Crites Field)	R	
West Bend	ETB	ETB	KETB	West Bend Municipal Airport	R	
				**General aviation airports**		
Amery	AHH	AHH	KAHH	Amery Municipal Airport	GA	
Antigo	AIG		KAIG	Langlade County Airport	GA	
Ashland	ASX	ASX	KASX	John F. Kennedy Memorial Airport	GA	
Baraboo / Wisconsin Dells	DLL		KDLL	Baraboo–Wisconsin Dells Airport	GA	
Black River Falls	BCK		KBCK	Black River Falls Area Airport	GA	
Boscobel	OVS		KOVS	Boscobel Airport	GA	
Boyceville	3T3			Boyceville Municipal Airport	GA	
Burlington	BUU		KBUU	Burlington Municipal Airport	GA	
Cable	3CU			Cable Union Airport	GA	
Clintonville	CLI	CLI	KCLI	Clintonville Municipal Airport	GA	
Crandon	Y55			Crandon Municipal Airport	GA	
Crivitz	3D1			Crivitz Municipal Airport	GA	
Cumberland	UBE		KUBE	Cumberland Municipal Airport	GA	
Eagle River	EGV	EGV	KEGV	Eagle River Union Airport	GA	
East Troy	57C			East Troy Municipal Airport	GA	
Ephraim	3D2			Ephraim–Gibraltar Airport	GA	
Fond du Lac	FLD	FLD	KFLD	Fond du Lac County Airport	GA	
Fort Atkinson	61C			Fort Atkinson Municipal Airport	GA	
Friendship / Adams	63C			Adams County Airport (Legion Field)	GA	
Grantsburg	GTG	GTG	KGTG	Grantsburg Municipal Airport	GA	
Hartford	HXF		KHXF	Hartford Municipal Airport	GA	
Hayward	HYR	HYR	KHYR	Sawyer County Airport	GA	
Janesville	JVL	JVL	KJVL	Southern Wisconsin Regional Airport	GA	
Juneau	UNU	UNU	KUNU	Dodge County Airport	GA	
La Pointe	4R5			Major Gilbert Field Airport	GA	
Ladysmith	RCX		KRCX	Rusk County Airport	GA	
Lancaster	73C			Lancaster Municipal Airport	GA	
Land O' Lakes	LNL		KLNL	Kings Land O' Lakes Airport	GA	
Lone Rock	LNR	LNR	KLNR	Tri-County Regional Airport	GA	
Manitowish Waters	D25			Manitowish Waters Airport	GA	
Manitowoc	MTW	MTW	KMTW	Manitowoc County Airport	GA	
Marshfield	MFI	MFI	KMFI	Marshfield Municipal Airport	GA	
Medford	MDZ	MDF	KMDZ	Taylor County Airport	GA	
Menomonie	LUM		KLUM	Menomonie Municipal Airport (Score Field)	GA	
Merrill	RRL	RRL	KRRL	Merrill Municipal Airport	GA	
Middleton	C29			Middleton Municipal Airport (Morey Field)	GA	
Mineral Point	MRJ		KMRJ	Iowa County Airport	GA	
Monroe	EFT		KEFT	Monroe Municipal Airport	GA	
Neillsville	VIQ		KVIQ	Neillsville Municipal Airport	GA	
New Holstein	8D1			New Holstein Municipal Airport	GA	
New Lisbon	82C			Mauston–New Lisbon Union Airport	GA	
New Richmond	RNH	RNH	KRNH	New Richmond Regional Airport	GA	
Oconto	OCQ		KOCQ	J. Douglas Bake Memorial Airport	GA	
Osceola	OEO	OEO	KOEO	L.O. Simenstad Municipal Airport	GA	
Oshkosh	OSH	OSH	KOSH	Wittman Regional Airport	GA	
Palmyra	88C			Palmyra Municipal Airport	GA	
Park Falls	PKF	PKF	KPKF	Park Falls Municipal Airport	GA	
Phillips	PBH		KPBH	Price County Airport	GA	
Platteville	PVB		KPVB	Platteville Municipal Airport	GA	
Portage	C47			Portage Municipal Airport	GA	
Prairie du Chien	PDC	PCD	KPDC	Prairie du Chien Municipal Airport	GA	
Prairie du Sac	91C			Sauk–Prairie Airport	GA	
Reedsburg	C35			Reedsburg Municipal Airport	GA	
Rice Lake	RPD	RIE	KRPD	Rice Lake Regional Airport (Carl's Field)	GA	
Richland Center	93C			Richland Airport	GA	
Shawano	EZS		KEZS	Shawano Municipal Airport	GA	
Sheboygan	SBM	SBM	KSBM	Sheboygan County Memorial International Airport	GA	
Shell Lake	SSQ		KSSQ	Shell Lake Municipal Airport	GA	
Siren	RZN		KRZN	Burnett County Airport	GA	
Solon Springs	OLG		KOLG	Solon Springs Municipal Airport	GA	
Sparta	CMY	CMY	KCMY	Sparta/Fort McCoy Airport	GA	
Stevens Point	STE	STE	KSTE	Stevens Point Municipal Airport	GA	
Sturgeon Bay	SUE	SUE	KSUE	Door County Cherryland Airport	GA	
Superior	SUW	SUW	KSUW	Richard I. Bong Airport	GA	
Tomahawk	TKV		KTKV	Tomahawk Regional Airport	GA	
Viroqua	Y51			Viroqua Municipal Airport	GA	
Washington Island	2P2			Washington Island Airport	GA	
Watertown	RYV		KRYV	Watertown Municipal Airport	GA	
Waupaca	PCZ		KPCZ	Waupaca Municipal Airport	GA	
Wausau	AUW	AUW	KAUW	Wausau Downtown Airport	GA	
Wautoma	Y50			Wautoma Municipal Airport	GA	
Wisconsin Rapids	ISW	ISW	KISW	South Wood County Airport (Alexander Field)	GA	
Woodruff / Minocqua	ARV	ARV	KARV	Lakeland Airport (Noble F. Lee Memorial Field)	GA	
				**Other public-use airports** (not listed in NPIAS)		
Barron	9Y7			Barron Municipal Airport		
Beloit	44C			Beloit Airport		
Boulder Junction	BDJ		KBDJ	Boulder Junction Airport		
Brodhead	C37			Brodhead Airport		
Camp Lake	49C			Camp Lake Airport		
Cassville	C74			Cassville Municipal Airport		
Chetek	Y23			Chetek Municipal-Southworth Airport		
Delavan	C59			Lake Lawn Airport		
Drummond	5G4			Eau Claire Lakes Airport		
Edgerton	58C			Jana Airport		
Elroy	60C			Elroy Municipal Airport		
Franksville	62C			Cindy Guntly Memorial Airport		
Green Bay	W26			Foxair Seaplane Base		
Iola	68C			Central County Airport		
Iron River	Y77			Bayfield County Airport		
Lac du Flambeau	4P5			Franks Seaplane Base		
Lake Geneva	C02	XES		Grand Geneva Resort Airport		
Madison / Cottage Grove	87Y			Blackhawk Airfield		
Necedah	DAF		KDAF	Necedah Airport		
Neenah	79C			Brennand Airport		
Oconto	30W			Sweetwater Bay Seaplane Base		
Prentice	5N2	PRW		Prentice Airport		
Pulaski	92C			Carter Airport		
Rio	94C			Gilbert Field		
Shiocton	W34			Shiocton Airport		
Solon Springs	SS1			North Country Seaplane Base		
Spooner	1H9			Nest of Eagles Airport (was FAA: 9WI7)		
Stoughton	99C			Quam's Marina Seaplane Base		
Sturtevant	C89			Sylvania Airport		
Sullivan	W11			Sullivan Airport		
Suring	7P5			Piso Airport		
Three Lakes	40D			Three Lakes Municipal Airport		
Tomah	Y72			Bloyer Field		
Verona	W19			Verona Airport		
Walworth	7V3			Big Foot Airfield		
Waunakee	6P3			Waunakee Airport		
West Bend	2T5			Hahn Sky Ranch Airport		
Whitewater	5Y3			Gutzmer's Twin Oaks Airport		
Wild Rose	W23			Wild Rose Idlewild Airport		
Wilmot	5K6			Westosha Airport		
Wonewoc	4D1			Three Castles Airpark		
				**Other military airports**		
Camp Douglas	VOK (Archive)	VOK	KVOK	Volk Field Air National Guard Base		104
				**Private-use airports** (partial list)		
Algoma	1WI8			Jorgensen-Stoller Airport		
Arena	WI61			Forseth Field Airport		
Athens	52WI			Johns Field Airport		
Beecher	WS25			Shangrila Airport		
Bevent	3WI3			Plover River Airfield		
Birchwood	WN98			Florida North Airport		
Boscobel	WS91			Sky Hollow Airport		
Brooklyn	7WI5			Syvrud Airport		
Brule	WI10			Cedar Island Airport		
Cecil	WI60			Deer Haven Ranch Airport		
Chippewa Falls	3WI9			Rosenbaum Field Airport		
Columbus	6WN6			Fountain Prairie Airport		
Comstock	0WI1			Mort's Landing Airport		
Cornell	4WI9			Cornell Municipal Airport (Cornell Airpark)		
Cumberland	2WN2			Silver Lake Seaplane Base		
Durand	WI25			Durand Municipal Airport		
East Troy	35WI			Barker Strip Airport		
Elkhorn	WI70			Swan Airport		
Exeland	26WI			Kitty-Wompus Airport		
Genoa City	4WI7			Vincent Airport		
Goodnow	WS39			Pinewood Air Park		
Granton	2WN6			Cunningham Airport		
Green Bay	88WI			Nicolet Airport		
Hazelhurst	48WI			Circle A Ranch Airport		
Holland	36WI			Holland Air Park		
Lake Geneva	WI89			Lake Geneva Aire Estates Airport		
Lake Nebagamon	WS31			Minnesuing Airport		
Lake Tomahawk	WI36			Dolhun Field Airport		
Lakewood	4WN3			Lakewood Airpark		
Laona	90WI			Heritage Acres Airport		
Luxemburg	8WI6			Funk Aerodrome		
Lyons	WI92			Wag-Aero Airport		
Markesan	13WI			Nowatzski Field Airport		
Mercer	2WI5			Blair Lake Airport		
Merrill	92WI			Knight Aire Airport		
Montello	0WI4			Snow Crest Ranch Airport		
Necedah	2WN5			Murmuring Springs Airport		
North Cape	WI72			Valhalla Airport		
Oconomowoc	WN46			Battle Creek Airport		
Ojibwa	WI37			Rainbow Airport		
Oostburg	2WI8			Davies Airport		
Oregon	15WI			Peterson Field Airport		
Oregon	WI40			Spiegel Field Airport		
Oshkosh	WS17			Pioneer Airport		
Pembine	WI90			Maverick Field Airport		
Prairie Farm	6WI0			Cub Acres Airport		
Princeton	1WI3			Bed-ah-Wick Field		
Rhinelander	WI42			Pine Grove Airport		
Rio	7WI2			Higgins Airport		
Rochester	27WI			Fox River Airport		
Royalton	38WI			Northport Airport		
Scandinavia	WI47			Timberline Airport		
Shawano	8WI1			Dillenburg's Airport		
Soldiers Grove	WS51			Leeward Farm Airport		
Tomahawk	4WI4			Turner Airport		
Waupun	WI07			Waupun Airport		
Wausau	5WN8			Knight Sky Airport		
Wausaukee	06WI			Lazy River Airport		
Webster	9WN2			Voyager Village Airstrip		
Winneconne	9WN1			Courtney Plummer Airport		
				**Former airports** (partial list)		
Hillsboro	~~HBW~~		~~KHBW~~	Joshua Sanford Field (closed fall 2016)		
Menasha	~~ATW~~			George A. Whiting Field (closed 1965)		
Rice Lake	~~RIE~~			Rice Lake Municipal Airport (closed 1995)		

== See also ==
- Wikipedia:WikiProject Aviation/Airline destination lists: North America#Wisconsin
