= W19 =

W19 may refer to:

- W19 (nuclear artillery shell)
- British NVC community W19, a woodland community in the British National Vegetation Classification system
- Hansa-Brandenburg W.19, a German fighter-reconnaissance aircraft
- Verona Airport (Wisconsin)
- W-19-class minesweeper, of the Imperial Japanese Navy
- Yinggarda language
