= Verona Airport (disambiguation) =

Verona Airport may refer to:

- Verona Airport, also known as Verona Villafranca Airport, Valerio Catullo, in Verona, Italy (IATA: VRN)
- Verona Airport (Wisconsin) in Verona, Wisconsin, United States (FAA: W19)
- Brescia Airport, sometimes advertised as Verona Airport, in Brescia, Italy (IATA: VBS)
