= Brennand =

Brennand may refer to:

== People ==
- Francisco Brennand (1927–2019), Brazilian sculptor
- Oliver Brennand (born 1986), British rugby union footballer
- Ricardo Brennand (born 1927), Brazilian entrepreneur

== Places ==
- Brennand Airport, airport in Winnebago County, Wisconsin, United States
- Brennand Farm, often claimed to be the true centre of Great Britain
- Brennand River, river in England
