= EGV =

EGV may refer to:

- Eagle River Union Airport (IATA code EGV)
- Elk Grove Village, Illinois, a municipality in the Chicago metropolitan area
- Entertain Golden Village, Thailand's first cineplex operator now owned by Major Cineplex
