= C47 =

C47 or C-47 may refer to:

- C47 road (Namibia)
- Caldwell 47, a globular cluster
- A clothespin used in filmmaking
- Douglas C-47 Skytrain, an American military transport aircraft
- Four Knights Game, a chess opening
- Nike Missile Site C-47 near Portage, Indiana
- Portage Municipal Airport in Columbia County, Wisconsin
