= KJVL =

KJVL may refer to:

- KJVL (FM), a radio station (88.1 FM) licensed to Hutchinson, Kansas, United States
- Southern Wisconsin Regional Airport (ICAO code KJVL)
