= Waukesha County Airport =

Coordinates: 43°02′28″N 088°14′13″W

Waukesha County International Airport Greater Milwaukee Airport
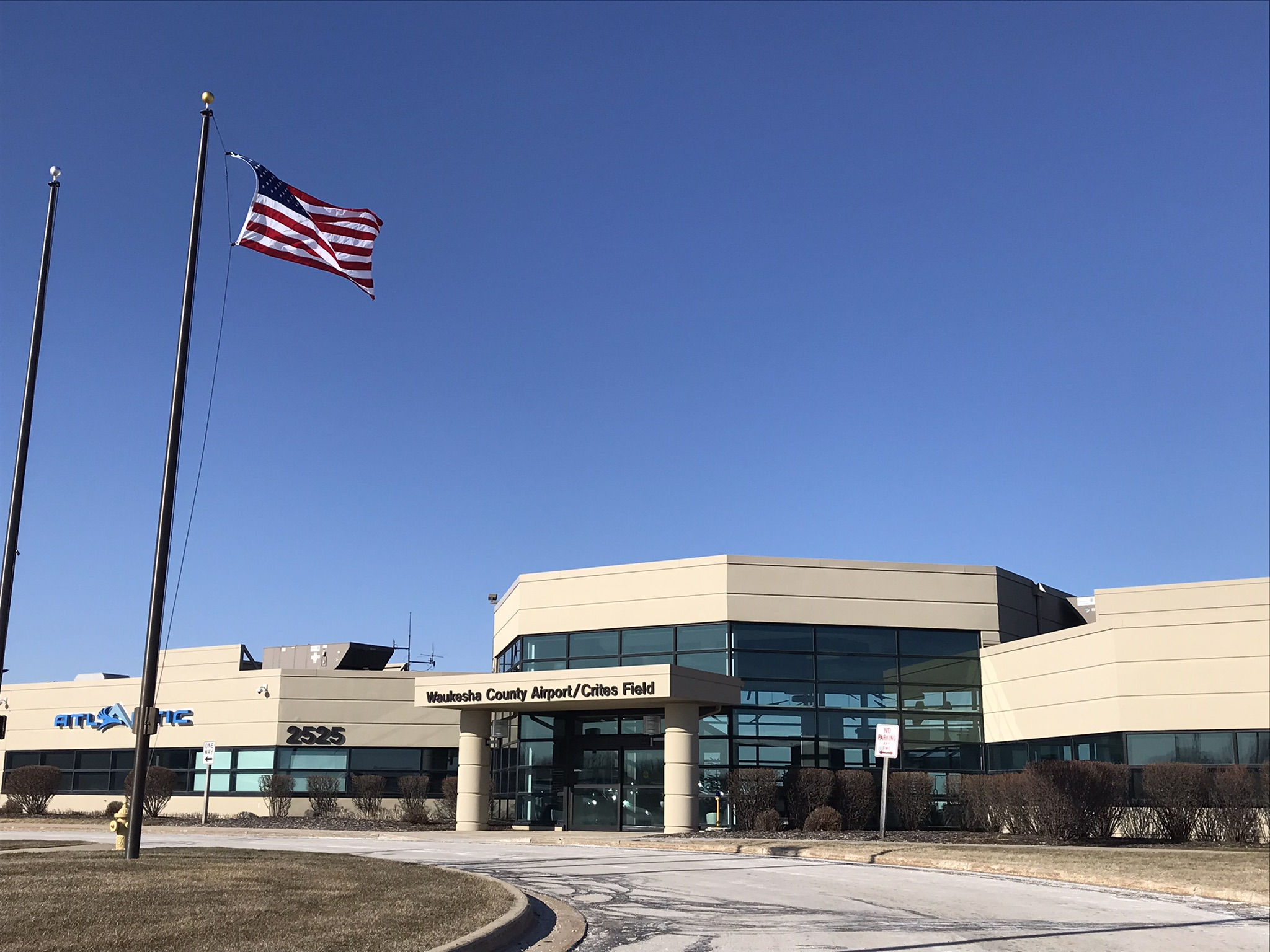
- IATA: UES; ICAO: KUES; FAA LID: UES

Summary
- Airport type: Public
- Owner/Operator: Waukesha County
- Location: Waukesha, Wisconsin
- Opened: September 1937
- Time zone: CST (UTC−06:00)
  - Summer (DST): CDT (UTC−05:00)
- Elevation AMSL: 912 ft (278 m)
- Website: waukeshacounty.gov/airport

Maps
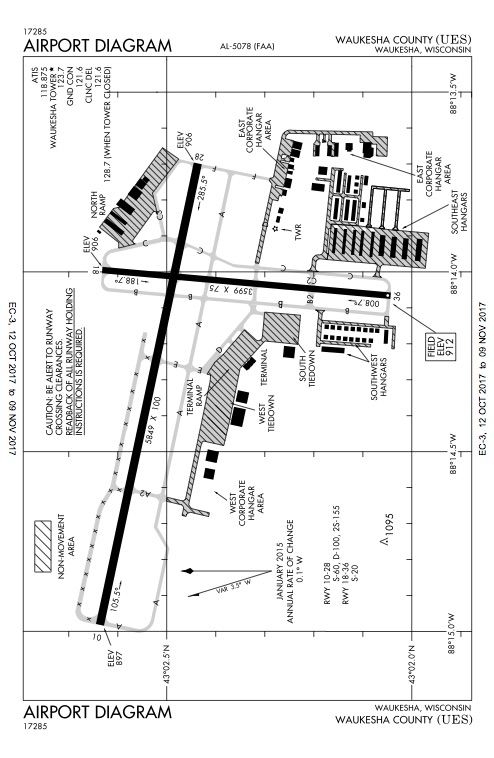
- FAA airport diagram

- Location of airport in Wisconsin UES (the United States)

Runways
Direction	Length		Surface
Direction	ft	m	Surface
10/28	6,250	1,905	Concrete
18/36	3,599	1,097	Asphalt

Statistics
- Aircraft operations (2021): 61,471
- Based aircraft (2024): 218
- Sources: FAA and airport website

Waukesha County Airport/Crites Field (IATA: UES, ICAO: KUES, FAA LID: UES) is a public use airport located two miles (3 km) north of the central business district of Waukesha, a city in Waukesha County, Wisconsin, United States. It is owned and operated by Waukesha County. It is included in the Federal Aviation Administration (FAA) National Plan of Integrated Airport Systems for 2025–2029, in which it is categorized as a national relief airport.

== Operations ==
Flight for Life-Wisconsin announced in October 2007 that it would move its operations to Waukesha in the summer of 2008. Due to distance concerns, they moved to the Burlington Municipal Airport in November 2021.

== Facilities and aircraft ==
Waukesha County Airport covers an area of 577 acres (234 ha) and contains two runways: the primary runway 10/28 with a concrete pavement measuring 6,250 x 100 ft (1,905 x 30 m) and the crosswind runway 18/36 with an asphalt surface measuring 3,599 x 75 ft (1,097 x 23 m). Waukesha County Airport's main runway 10/28 was completely reconstructed in the summer of 2015. They expanded their parking lot in 2023.

For the 12-month period ending April 30, 2021, the airport had 61,471 aircraft operations, an average of 168 per day: 95% general aviation, 5% air taxi, and less than 1% military. In August 2024, there were 218 aircraft based at this airport: 168 single-engine and 18 multi-engine airplanes, 25 jet, 5 helicopter and 2 glider.

== See also ==
- List of airports in Wisconsin
