= Marshfield Municipal Airport =

Marshfield Municipal Airport may refer to:

- Marshfield Municipal Airport (Massachusetts) in Marshfield, Massachusetts, United States (FAA: GHG)
- Marshfield Municipal Airport (Wisconsin) in Marshfield, Wisconsin, United States (FAA: MFI)
