= Menomonie Municipal Airport =

Public use airport in Menomonie, Wisconsin

- IATA: none; ICAO: KLUM; FAA LID: LUM

Summary
- Airport type: Public
- Owner: City of Menomonie
- Serves: Menomonie, Wisconsin
- Opened: June 1986
- Time zone: CST (UTC−06:00)
  - Summer (DST): CDT (UTC−05:00)
- Elevation AMSL: 895 ft / 273 m
- Coordinates: 44°53′32.40″N 091°32′04.10″W

Map
- Location of airport in Wisconsin LUM (the United States)

Runways
| Direction | Length | | Surface |
| Direction | ft | m | Surface |
|---|---|---|---|
| 9/27 | 5,074 | 1,547 | Asphalt |
| 18/36 | 3,470 | 1,058 | Asphalt |

Statistics
- Aircraft operations (2023): 13,550
- Based aircraft (2024): 32
- Source: Federal Aviation Administration

Menomonie Municipal Airport (ICAO: KLUM, FAA LID: LUM) is a city-owned public use airport located three miles east of the central business district of Menomonie, a city in Dunn County, Wisconsin, United States. It is included in the Federal Aviation Administration (FAA) National Plan of Integrated Airport Systems for 2025–2029, in which it is categorized as a local general aviation facility.

== Facilities and aircraft ==
Menomonie Municipal Airport covers an area of 277 acres (112 ha) at an elevation of 895 feet (273 m) above mean sea level. It has two runways: the primary runway 9/27 with a 5,074 x 75 ft (1,547 x 23 m) asphalt surface and the crosswind runway 18/36 with a 3,470 x 75 ft (1,058 x 23 m) asphalt surface.

For the 12-month period ending August 31, 2023, the airport had 13,550 aircraft operations, an average of 37 per day: 99% general aviation and less than 1% air taxi. In August 2024, there were 32 aircraft based at this airport: 29 single-engine, 2 multi-engine and 1 glider.

== See also ==
- List of airports in Wisconsin
