= John H. Batten Airport =

Airport in Wisconsin, United States

Coordinates: 42°45′40″N 087°48′50″W

John H. Batten Airport Batten International Airport
- IATA: RAC; ICAO: KRAC; FAA LID: RAC

Summary
- Airport type: Public
- Owner: Racine Commercial Airport Corp.
- Serves: Racine, Wisconsin
- Opened: January 1941
- Time zone: CST (UTC−06:00)
  - Summer (DST): CDT (UTC−05:00)
- Elevation AMSL: 674 ft (205 m)
- Website: www.BattenAirport.aero

Map
- Location of airport in Wisconsin RAC (the United States)

Runways
Direction	Length		Surface
Direction	ft	m	Surface
4/22	6,574	2,004	Concrete
14/32	4,421	1,348	Asphalt

Statistics
- Aircraft operations (2021): 47,000
- Based aircraft (2024): 91
- Source: Federal Aviation Administration

John H. Batten Airport (IATA: RAC, ICAO: KRAC, FAA LID: RAC), also known as Batten International Airport, is a public use airport located 2 miles (3 km; 2 nmi) northwest of the central business district of Racine, a city in Racine County, Wisconsin, United States. It is privately owned by the Racine Commercial Airport Corporation. It is included in the Federal Aviation Administration (FAA) National Plan of Integrated Airport Systems for 2025–2029, in which it is categorized as a regional reliever airport facility.

== History ==
The airport was founded in 1941 by Carlyle Godske on roughly 160 acres (65 ha) of land purchased from local businessman J.A. Horlick. For most of its history, the airport was known as Racine-Horlick Field, but on September 5, 1989, the name was changed to John H. Batten Field. Batten was one of the airport's early founders and supporters as well as the longtime CEO of Racine's Twin Disc, Inc.

During World War II (ca 1941-1945), the newly established airport was used as a flight and ground school for the Army. Students were housed at Racine College on the south side of Racine. Ground school instruction was given at Horlick High School and the actual flight training took place at the airport. Today, the airport is used primarily by local aviation enthusiasts and by the corporate jets of large local companies such as S.C. Johnson & Son and Twin Disc, Inc.

On July 30, 2010, plans were announced to have a full-time aviation maintenance firm on the field, planned to have opened on September 1, 2010.

== Facilities and aircraft ==
John H. Batten Airport covers an area of 411 acres (166 ha), including two paved runways:

- 4/22 with a 6,574 x 100 ft (2,004 x 30 m) with concrete surface
- 14/32 measuring 4,421 x 100 ft (1,348 x 30 m) with asphalt pavement

For the 12-month period ending June 15, 2021, the airport had 47,000 aircraft operations, an average of 129 per day: 96% general aviation and 4% air taxi. In August 2024, there were 91 aircraft based at this airport: 75 single-engine, 8 multi-engine, 5 jet, 2 helicopter and 1 ultra-light.

== See also ==
- List of airports in Wisconsin
