= Burlington Airport =

Burlington Airport may refer to:

== Canada ==
- Burlington Executive Airport, Ontario, Canada (ICAO: CZBA)

== United States ==
- Burlington International Airport, Vermont, United States (ICAO: KBTV)
- Burlington Municipal Airport (Wisconsin), United States
- Burlington-Alamance Regional Airport, North Carolina, United States (ICAO: KBUY)
- Southeast Iowa Regional Airport, Iowa, United States (ICAO: KBRL)
- Burlington Municipal Airport (Massachusetts), a former airport in the United States
