= Racine County, Wisconsin =

- County
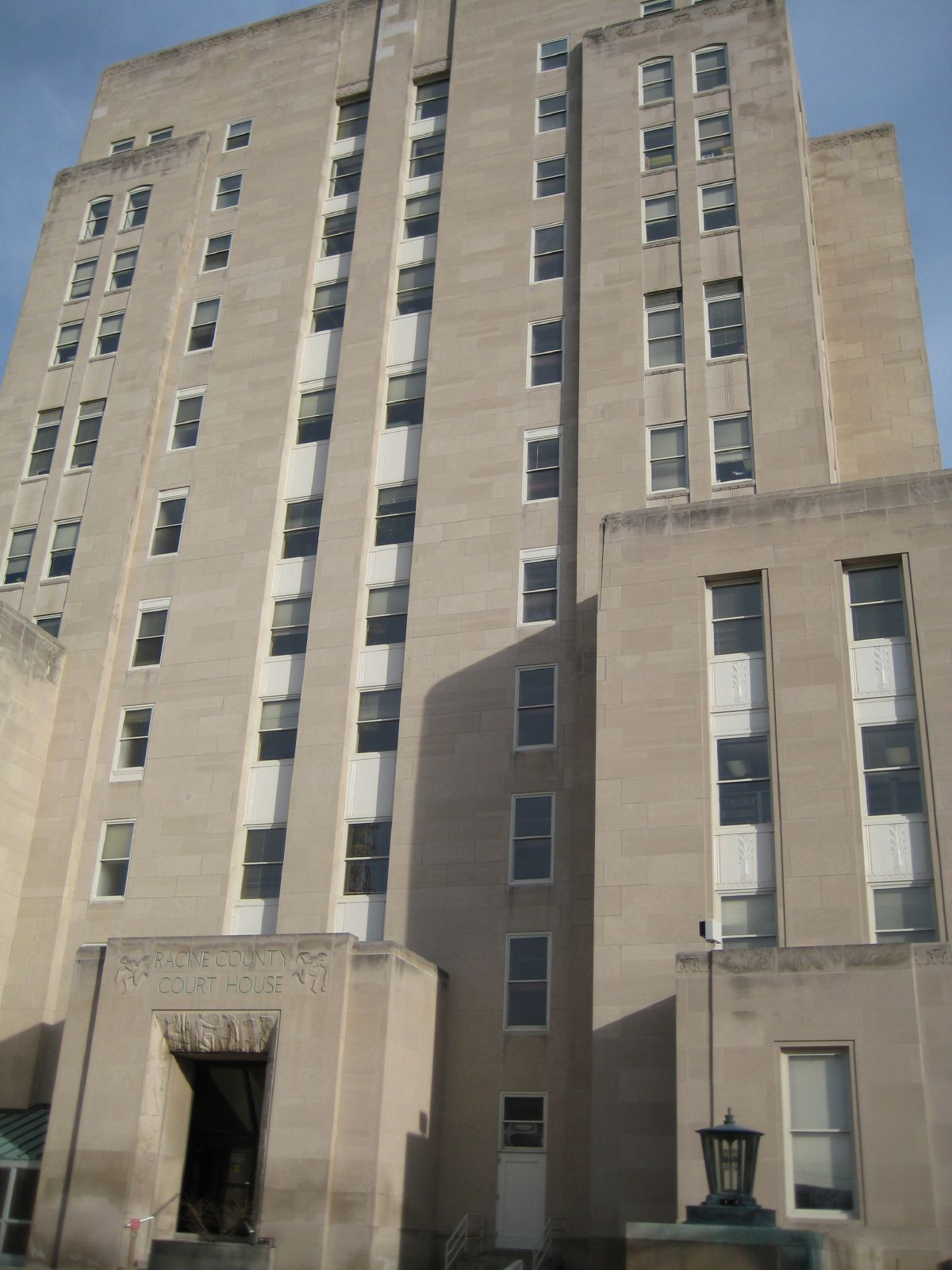
- Racine County Courthouse

- Flag

- Location within the U.S. state of Wisconsin
- Coordinates: 42.78°N 87.76°W
- Country: United States
- State: Wisconsin
- Founded: December 7, 1836
- Seat: Racine
- Largest city: Racine

Area
  - Total: 792 sq mi (2,050 km^{2})
  - Land: 333 sq mi (860 km^{2})
  - Water: 460 sq mi (1,200 km^{2}) 58%

Population (2020)
  - Total: 197,727
  - Estimate (2025): 198,919 ▲
  - Density: 594.4/sq mi (229.5/km^{2})
- Time zone: UTC−6 (Central)
  - Summer (DST): UTC−5 (CDT)
- Congressional district: 1st
- Website: www.racinecounty.gov

Racine County (/rəˈsiːn, reɪ-/ rə-SEEN, ray-) is a county in southeastern Wisconsin. As of the 2020 census, its population was 197,727, making it Wisconsin's fifth-most populous county. Its county seat is Racine. The county was founded in 1836, then a part of the Wisconsin Territory. The Root River is the county's namesake, as racine is the French for "root".

Racine County comprises the Racine metropolitan statistical area. This area is part of the Milwaukee-Racine-Waukesha combined statistical area. According to the U.S. Census Bureau, the county has an area of 792 square miles (2,050 km^{2}), of which 333 square miles (860 km^{2}) is land and 460 square miles (1,200 km^{2}) (58%) is water. The county's unemployment rate was 5.6% in June 2021.

== History ==
The Potawatomi people occupied the area of Racine County until European settlement. The Wisconsin Territory legislature established Racine County in 1836, separating it from Milwaukee County. Racine County originally extended to Wisconsin's southern border and encompassed the land that is now Kenosha County, Wisconsin. Kenosha County was created as a separate entity in 1850.

== Adjacent counties ==
- Milwaukee County (north)
- Ottawa County, Michigan (northeast across Lake Michigan)
- Allegan County, Michigan (southeast across Lake Michigan)
- Kenosha County (south)
- Walworth County (west)
- Waukesha County (northwest)

== Demographics ==
Historical population
Census	Pop.	Note	%±
1840	3,475		—
1850	14,973		330.9%
1860	21,360		42.7%
1870	26,740		25.2%
1880	30,922		15.6%
1890	36,268		17.3%
1900	45,644		25.9%
1910	57,424		25.8%
1920	78,961		37.5%
1930	90,217		14.3%
1940	94,047		4.2%
1950	109,585		16.5%
1960	141,781		29.4%
1970	170,838		20.5%
1980	173,132		1.3%
1990	175,034		1.1%
2000	188,831		7.9%
2010	195,408		3.5%
2020	197,727		1.2%
2025 (est.)	198,919	▲	0.6%
U.S. Decennial Census; 1790–1960 1900–1990; 1990–2000 2010–2020 2020 census

=== Racial and ethnic composition ===
Racine County, Wisconsin – Racial and ethnic composition Note: the US Census treats Hispanic/Latino as an ethnic category. This table excludes Latinos from the racial categories and assigns them to a separate category. Hispanics/Latinos may be of any race.
Race / ethnicity (NH = Non-Hispanic)	Pop 1980	Pop 1990	Pop 2000	Pop 2010	Pop 2020	% 1980	% 1990	% 2000	% 2010	% 2020
White alone (NH)	150,936	147,745	150,238	145,414	135,333	87.18%	84.41%	79.56%	74.42%	68.44%
Black or African American alone (NH)	13,731	16,693	19,441	21,212	22,531	7.93%	9.54%	10.30%	10.86%	11.40%
Native American or Alaska Native alone (NH)	419	456	541	614	538	0.24%	0.26%	0.29%	0.31%	0.27%
Asian alone (NH)	576	964	1,331	2,081	2,261	0.33%	0.55%	0.70%	1.06%	1.14%
Native Hawaiian or Pacific Islander alone (NH)	x	x	54	40	47	x	x	0.03%	0.02%	0.02%
Other race alone (NH)	269	142	156	228	792	0.16%	0.08%	0.08%	0.12%	0.40%
Mixed race or Multiracial (NH)	x	x	2,080	3,273	8,314	x	x	1.10%	1.67%	4.20%
Hispanic or Latino (any race)	7,201	9,034	14,990	22,546	27,911	4.16%	5.16%	7.94%	11.54%	14.12%
Total	173,132	175,034	188,831	195,408	197,727	100.00%	100.00%	100.00%	100.00%	100.00%

=== 2020 census ===
As of the 2020 census, the population was 197,727. The population density was 594.4 people per square mile (229.5 people/km^{2}). There were 84,490 housing units at an average density of 254.0 units per square mile (98.1 units/km^{2}).

The median age was 41.1 years. 22.6% of residents were under the age of 18 and 17.6% of residents were 65 years of age or older.

For every 100 females there were 97.5 males, and for every 100 females age 18 and over there were 95.9 males age 18 and over.

The racial makeup of the county was 72.0% White, 11.8% Black or African American, 0.5% American Indian and Alaska Native, 1.2% Asian, <0.1% Native Hawaiian and Pacific Islander, 5.4% from some other race, and 9.0% from two or more races.

Hispanic or Latino residents of any race comprised 14.1% of the population.

85.7% of residents lived in urban areas, while 14.3% lived in rural areas.

There were 78,959 households in the county, of which 29.1% had children under the age of 18 living in them. Of all households, 46.0% were married-couple households, 18.4% were households with a male householder and no spouse or partner present, and 27.5% were households with a female householder and no spouse or partner present. About 28.5% of all households were made up of individuals and 12.1% had someone living alone who was 65 years of age or older.

Of those housing units, 6.5% were vacant. Among occupied housing units, 67.7% were owner-occupied and 32.3% were renter-occupied. The homeowner vacancy rate was 1.1% and the rental vacancy rate was 6.1%.

2000 Census Age Pyramid for Racine County

=== 2000 census ===
As of the census of 2000, there were 188,831 people, 70,819 households, and 49,856 families residing in the county. The population density was 567 people per square mile (219 people/km^{2}). There were 74,718 housing units at an average density of 224 units per square mile (86 units/km^{2}). The racial makeup of the county was 83.04% White, 10.47% Black or African American, 0.36% Native American, 0.72% Asian, 0.04% Pacific Islander, 3.69% from other races, and 1.67% from two or more races. 7.94% of the population were Hispanic or Latino of any race. 32.9% were of German, 7.4% Polish and 5.5% Irish ancestry.

There were 70,819 households, of which 34.5% had children under 18 living with them, 54.0% were married couples living together, 12.3% had a female householder with no husband present, and 29.6% were non-families. 24.5% of all households were made up of individuals, and 9.2% had someone living alone who was 65 or older. The average household size was 2.59 and the average family size was 3.09.

In the county, the population was spread out, with 27.0% under 18, 8.3% from 18 to 24, 29.9% from 25 to 44, 22.5% from 45 to 64, and 12.3% who were 65 or older. The median age was 36. For every 100 females there were 98.0 males. For every 100 females 18 and over, there were 95.5 males.

== Transportation ==
=== Major highways ===
- I-41 / I-94 / US 41
- US 45
- WIS 11
- WIS 20
- WIS 31
- WIS 32
- WIS 36
- WIS 38
- WIS 75
- WIS 83
- WIS 142
- WIS 164
- WIS 311

=== Railroads ===
- Amtrak
- Canadian National
- Canadian Pacific
- Union Pacific
- Sturtevant station

=== Buses ===
- Ryde Racine

=== Airports ===
- John H. Batten Airport (KRAC) serves the county and surrounding communities.
- Burlington Municipal Airport (KBUU) enhances county service.
- Cindy Guntly Memorial Airport (62C) enhances county service.
- Fox River Airport (96C) enhances county service.
- Sylvania Airport (C89) enhances county service.

== Communities ==
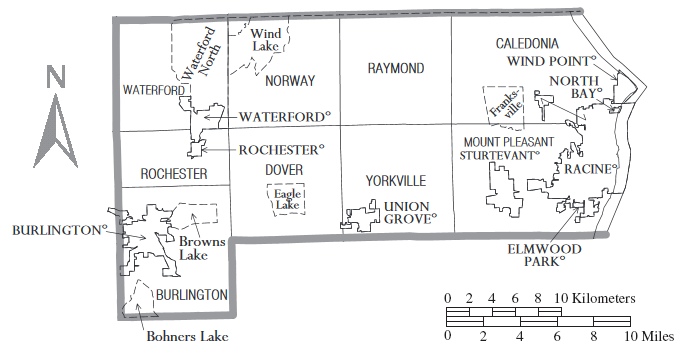
Map of Racine County, with municipal boundaries

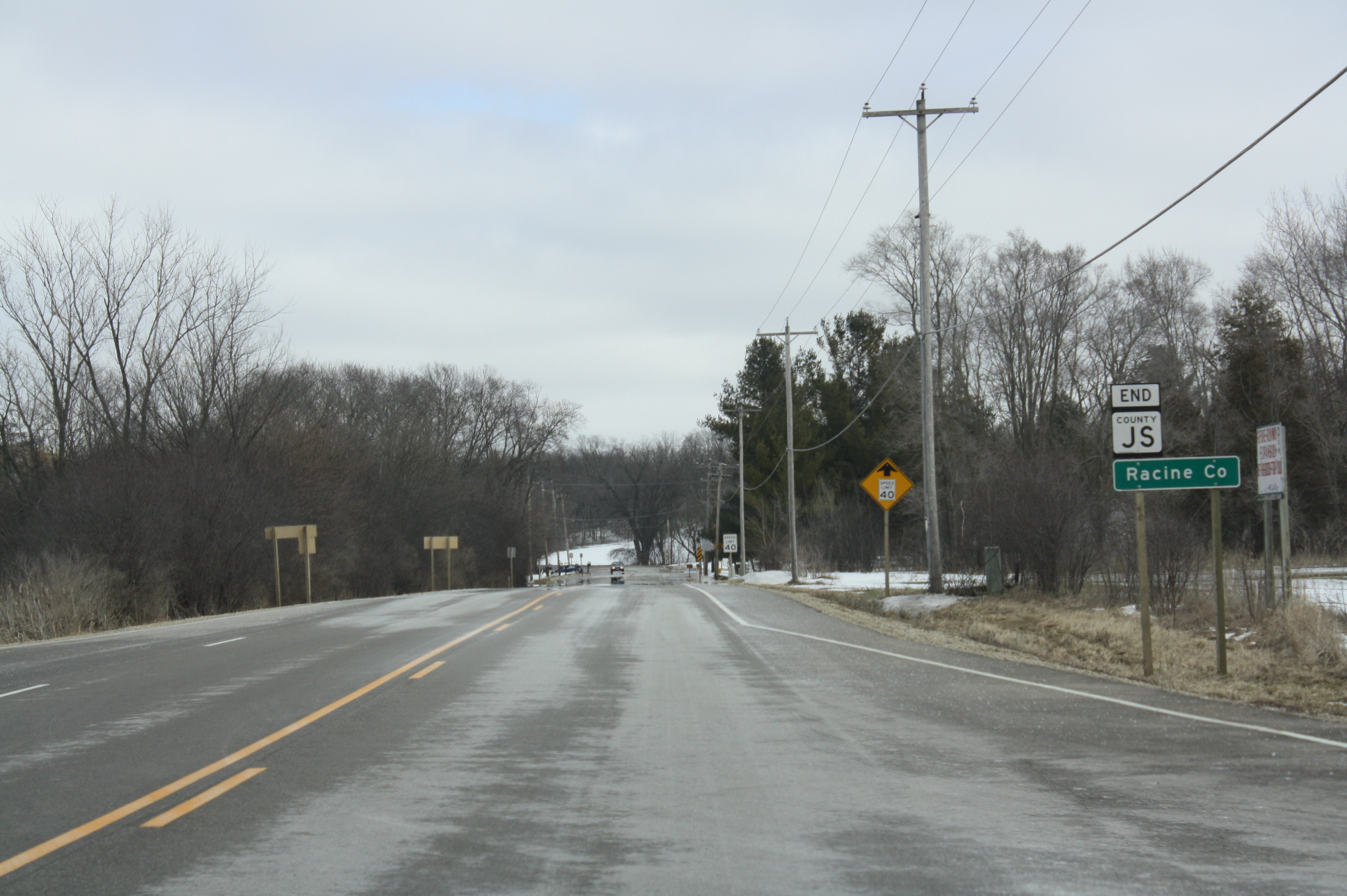
Racine County sign on WIS 11

=== Cities ===
- Burlington (partly in Walworth County)
- Racine (county seat)

=== Villages ===
- Caledonia
- Elmwood Park
- Mount Pleasant
- North Bay
- Raymond
- Rochester
- Sturtevant
- Union Grove
- Waterford
- Wind Point
- Yorkville

=== Towns ===
- Burlington
- Dover
- Norway
- Waterford

=== Census-designated places ===
- Bohners Lake (Town of Burlington)
- Browns Lake (Town of Burlington)
- Eagle Lake (Town of Dover)
- Tichigan (Town of Waterford)
- Wind Lake (Town of Norway)

=== Unincorporated communities ===
- Beaumont
- Buena Park
- Caldwell
- Cedar Park
- Eagle Lake Manor
- Eagle Lake Terrace
- Franksville
- Honey Creek (partial)
- Honey Lake (partial)
- Husher
- Ives Grove
- Kansasville
- Kneeland
- North Cape
- Raymond
- Rosewood
- Sylvania
- Union Church
- Yorkville

=== Ghost towns/neighborhoods ===
- DeNoon
- Muskego Settlement
- Raymond Center

== Government ==
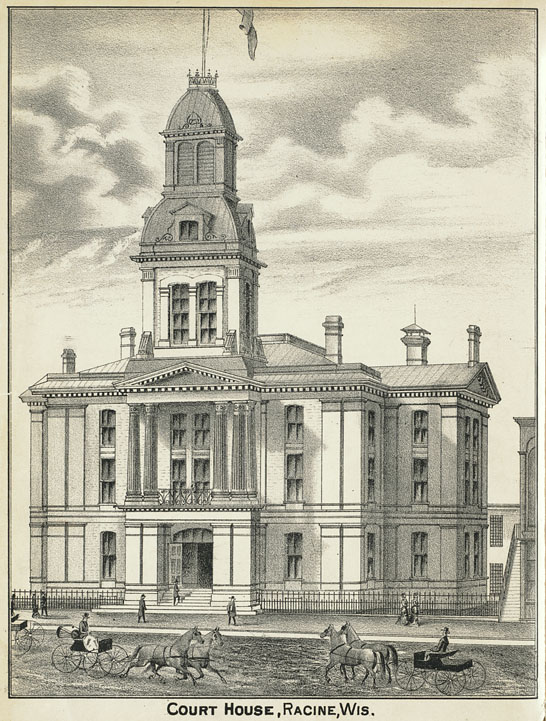
1879 engraving of the Racine County courthouse

The County Board has 21 members, each elected from single-member districts in nonpartisan elections. In 1974, county voters voted in favor of a referendum to replace the appointed county administrator with an elected county executive, with the first election taking place in 1975. The County Executive is elected in nonpartisan elections taking place in the spring. The current County Executive is Ralph Malicki, who was elected in a 2024 special election following the death of County Executive Jonathan Delagrave.

Racine County Executives
Name	Term start	Term end	Elected
Gilbert Berthelsen	May 5, 1975	March 3, 1982	1975, 1979
John Neis (interim)	March 12, 1982	May 7, 1982	Appointed as acting and then interim County Executive following Berthelsen's resignation.
Leonard Ziolkowski	May 7, 1982	April 21, 1987	1982 (special), 1983
Dennis Kornwolf	April 21, 1987	April 18, 1995	1987, 1991
Jean Jacobson	April 18, 1995	April 15, 2003	1995, 1999
William McReynolds	April 15, 2003	April 19, 2011	2003, 2007
Jim Ladwig	April 19, 2011	December 30, 2014	2011
Peter Hansen (interim)	December 30, 2014	April 21, 2015	Appointed acting and then interim County Executive following Ladwig's resignation.
Jonathan Delagrave	April 21, 2015	June 28, 2024	2015, 2019, 2023
Thomas Kramer (acting)	June 28, 2024	July 23, 2024	Became acting County Executive following Delagrave's death.
Thomas Roanhouse (interim)	July 23, 2024	December 30, 2024	Appointed interim County Executive.
Ralph Malicki	December 30, 2024	incumbent	2024 (special)

== Politics ==
Racine County has been a bellwether county, having voted for the winning presidential candidate in 28 of the last 33 elections since 1896 despite its solidly Democratic county seat, Racine, Wisconsin. The only exceptions to this were when it voted for Charles Evans Hughes in 1916, Gerald Ford in 1976, Michael Dukakis in 1988, and Donald Trump in 2020. No presidential candidate has won over 60 percent of the vote in Racine County since 1964.

United States presidential election results for Racine County, Wisconsin
Year	Republican		Democratic		Third party(ies)	
Year	No.	%	No.	%	No.	%
1892	3,956	46.19%	3,750	43.79%	858	10.02%
1896	5,849	57.61%	3,975	39.15%	329	3.24%
1900	5,925	58.37%	3,855	37.98%	371	3.65%
1904	5,573	55.61%	2,584	25.79%	1,864	18.60%
1908	5,490	52.77%	3,688	35.45%	1,226	11.78%
1912	2,606	29.42%	3,909	44.13%	2,343	26.45%
1916	5,081	47.77%	4,495	42.26%	1,061	9.97%
1920	14,406	71.95%	3,650	18.23%	1,965	9.81%
1924	13,040	50.21%	1,463	5.63%	11,466	44.15%
1928	17,423	56.56%	13,021	42.27%	362	1.18%
1932	10,754	32.49%	19,960	60.31%	2,383	7.20%
1936	10,850	28.73%	24,474	64.80%	2,447	6.48%
1940	18,753	43.63%	23,532	54.75%	693	1.61%
1944	18,220	41.11%	25,697	57.97%	408	0.92%
1948	19,029	43.45%	23,266	53.12%	1,502	3.43%
1952	30,628	54.65%	25,241	45.03%	180	0.32%
1956	31,968	58.21%	22,646	41.24%	305	0.56%
1960	29,562	49.03%	30,596	50.74%	136	0.23%
1964	21,434	36.14%	37,785	63.71%	87	0.15%
1968	28,028	44.78%	27,045	43.21%	7,513	12.00%
1972	38,490	56.41%	27,778	40.71%	1,968	2.88%
1976	37,088	49.00%	36,740	48.54%	1,858	2.45%
1980	39,683	49.76%	33,565	42.09%	6,494	8.14%
1984	42,092	52.84%	36,955	46.39%	616	0.77%
1988	36,342	47.42%	39,631	51.72%	658	0.86%
1992	32,310	36.79%	34,875	39.71%	20,634	23.50%
1996	30,107	38.81%	38,567	49.72%	8,894	11.47%
2000	44,014	49.53%	41,563	46.77%	3,288	3.70%
2004	52,456	51.65%	48,229	47.48%	884	0.87%
2008	45,954	45.66%	53,408	53.07%	1,280	1.27%
2012	49,347	47.74%	53,008	51.28%	1,009	0.98%
2016	46,681	49.50%	42,641	45.22%	4,980	5.28%
2020	54,479	51.18%	50,159	47.12%	1,813	1.70%
2024	56,347	52.33%	49,721	46.17%	1,618	1.50%

== See also ==
- Peggy Johnson, a young woman whose body was discovered in 1999 in Raymond
- National Register of Historic Places listings in Racine County, Wisconsin
