= Ephraim–Gibraltar Airport =

Ephraim-Gibraltar Airport
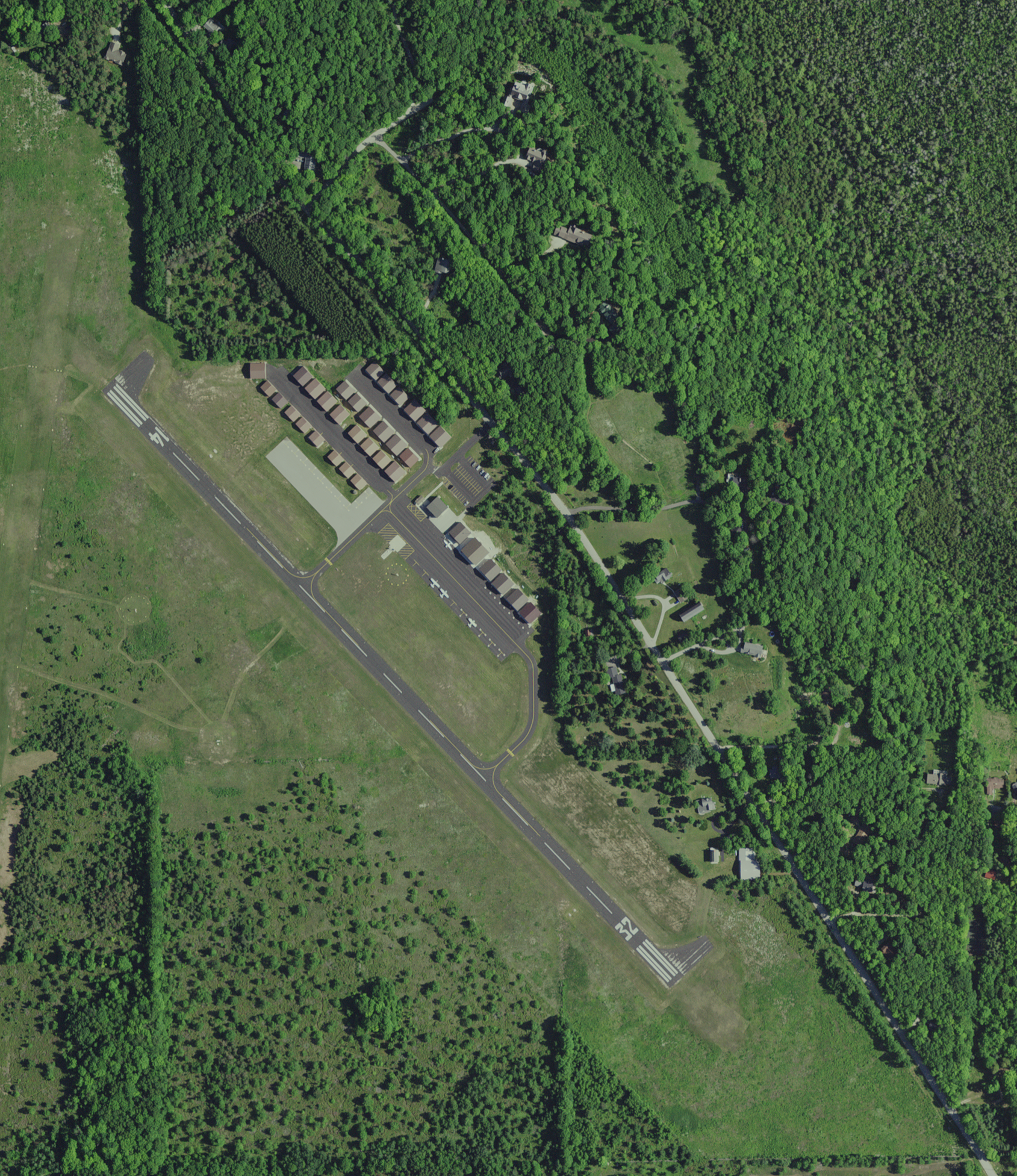
- IATA: none; ICAO: none; FAA LID: 3D2

Summary
- Airport type: Public
- Owner/Operator: Village of Ephraim and Town of Gibraltar
- Location: Ephraim, Wisconsin
- Opened: October 1947
- Time zone: CST (UTC−06:00)
  - Summer (DST): CDT (UTC−05:00)
- Elevation AMSL: 763 ft (233 m)
- Coordinates: 45°08′09″N 087°11′17″W
- Website: FriendsOfEphraimGibraltarAirport

Map
- Location of airport in Wisconsin 3D2 (the United States)

Runways
Direction	Length		Surface
Direction	ft	m	Surface
14/32	2,697	822	Asphalt
1/19	2,324	708	Turf

Statistics
- Aircraft operations (2023): 9,300
- Based aircraft (2024): 22
- Source: Federal Aviation Administration

Ephraim–Gibraltar Airport (FAA LID: 3D2) is a public use airport located one nautical mile (2 km) southwest of the central business district of Ephraim, a village in Door County, Wisconsin, United States. The airport is owned by the Village of Ephraim and the Town of Gibraltar. It was formerly known as Ephraim-Fish Creek Airport.

It is included in the Federal Aviation Administration (FAA) National Plan of Integrated Airport Systems for 2025–2029, in which it is categorized as a local general aviation facility.

== History ==
The first runway at the airport was graded in 1945.

== Facilities and aircraft ==
Ephraim–Gibraltar Airport covers an area of 239 acres (97 ha) at an elevation of 763 feet (233 m) above mean sea level. It has two runways: 14/32 is 2,697 by 60 feet (822 x 18 m) with an asphalt surface and 1/19 is 2,324 by 100 feet (708 x 30 m) with a turf surface.

Runway 1/19 slopes to the south such that one end of the runway can not be seen from the other. The airport provides 100LL aircraft fuel.

For the 12-month period ending August 16, 2023, the airport had 9,300 aircraft operations, an average of 25 per day, with 59% transient general aviation, 38% local general aviation and 3% air taxi. In August 2024, there were 22 aircraft based at this airport: 18 single-engine, 2 multi-engine and 2 helicopter.

== Climate ==
Ephraim-Gibraltar Airport

Climate chart (precipitation, max. and min. temperature)
J	F	M	A	M	J	J	A	S	O	N	D
63 −6 −9	52 −8 −18	49 1 −6	97 9 −1	86 14 4	91 19 9	105 19 14	96 22 17	96 18 13	107 10 5	80 5 2	57 2 −4
- █ Average max. and min. temperatures in °C
- █ Precipitation totals in mm
Imperial conversion
J	F	M	A	M	J	J	A	S	O	N	D
2.5 21 16	2 18 0	1.9 34 21	3.8 48 30	3.4 57 39	3.6 66 48	4.1 66 57	3.8 72 63	3.8 64 55	4.2 50 41	3.1 41 36	2.2 36 25
- █ Average max. and min. temperatures in °F
- █ Precipitation totals in inches

== See also ==
- List of airports in Wisconsin
