= Raymond Center, Wisconsin =

Coordinates: 42°48′03″N 88°00′45″W

Raymond Center is a ghost town in the Village of Raymond in Racine County, Wisconsin, United States.

During the early years of white settlement of the Town, a hamlet developed nearly in the very center of the town, which became known as “Raymond Center.” A post office was maintained there in the late 1830s or 1840s which used the name of “Raymond” (the word “Center” was dropped). For some time it was a trading point for the settlers of the region, but when the post office was closed down most of the businesses relocated. A Congregational church was established there at an early date, and as of 1916 the old church and a schoolhouse still carried the title of “Raymond Center”.

The present-day unincorporated area of Raymond is located in roughly the same area, and may arguably be considered the same place.
