= Capitol Airport =

Airport in Brookfield, Wisconsin, US

- IATA: none; ICAO: none; FAA LID: 02C

Summary
- Airport type: Public
- Owner: Wisconsin Aviation Investments LLC
- Serves: Brookfield, Wisconsin
- Opened: May 1948
- Time zone: CST (UTC−06:00)
  - Summer (DST): CDT (UTC−05:00)
- Elevation AMSL: 844 ft (257 m)
- Coordinates: 43°05′23″N 088°10′46″W

Map
- Location of airport in Wisconsin 02C (the United States)

Runways
Direction	Length		Surface
Direction	ft	m	Surface
3/21	2,994	913	Asphalt
9/27	3,387	1,033	Turf
18/36	1,602	488	Turf

Statistics
- Aircraft operations (2022): 13,010
- Based aircraft (2024): 116
- Source: Federal Aviation Administration

Capitol Airport (FAA LID: 02C) is a public use airport located three nautical miles (6 km) northwest of the central business district of Brookfield, a city in Waukesha County, Wisconsin, United States. It is privately owned by Wisconsin Aviation Investments, LLC. The airport is also known as, or was formerly known as, Capitol Drive Airport.

It is included in the Federal Aviation Administration (FAA) National Plan of Integrated Airport Systems for 2025–2029, in which it is categorized as a regional reliever airport facility.

== Facilities and aircraft ==
Capitol Airport covers an area of 207 acres (84 ha) at an elevation of 844 feet (257 m) above mean sea level. It has one asphalt paved runway designated 3/21 which measures 2,994 x 45 ft. (913 x 13 m), plus two turf runways: 9/27 measuring 3,387 x 100 ft. (1,033 x 30 m) and 18/36 measuring 1,602 x 80 ft. (488 x 24 m).

The facility has no published instrument procedures and no instrument navigational aids.

For the 12-month period ending July 22, 2022, the airport had 13,010 aircraft operations, an average of 36 per day: 99% general aviation and less than 1% military. In August 2024, there were 116 aircraft based at this airport: 107 single-engine, 2 multi-engine, 1 jet and 6 helicopter.

Brookfield Aero, LLC, is the fixed-base operator.

== Incidents ==
- Two people were killed on November 21, 1992, when their Piper PA-28-140 crashed while attempting to land in low visibility.
- A groundskeeper was seriously injured when he was struck by the propeller of a Cessna 120 taxiing prior to takeoff on September 6, 2002.
- One person was killed and two people were injured on January 4, 2017, when their plane crashed during takeoff.

== See also ==
- List of airports in Wisconsin
