= Southern Wisconsin Regional Airport =

Airport in Rock County, Wisconsin

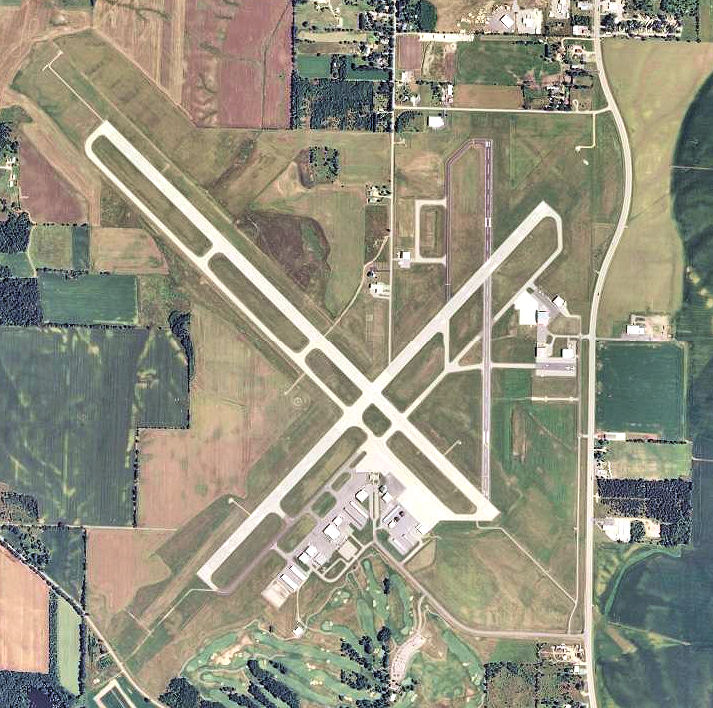
- 2006 USGS airphoto
- IATA: JVL; ICAO: KJVL; FAA LID: JVL

Summary
- Airport type: Public
- Owner: Rock County
- Serves: Janesville, Wisconsin
- Location: Town of Rock, Rock County
- Opened: April 1946
- Time zone: CST (UTC−06:00)
  - Summer (DST): CDT (UTC−05:00)
- Elevation AMSL: 808 ft (246 m)
- Coordinates: 42°37′13″N 89°02′30″W
- Website: jvlairport.com

Map
- Location of airport in Wisconsin JVL (the United States)

Runways
Direction	Length		Surface
Direction	ft	m	Surface
14/32	7,302	2,226	Concrete
4/22	6,701	2,042	Asphalt
18/36	5,004	1,525	Asphalt

Statistics
- Aircraft operations (2021): 54,744
- Based aircraft (2024): 87
- Source: Federal Aviation Administration

Southern Wisconsin Regional Airport (IATA: JVL, ICAO: KJVL, FAA LID: JVL) is a public airport located southwest of Janesville and north of Beloit in Rock County, Wisconsin, United States. Formerly known as Rock County Airport, it is owned and operated by the Rock County government. The airport has no scheduled commercial passenger service.

It is included in the Federal Aviation Administration (FAA) National Plan of Integrated Airport Systems for 2025–2029, in which it is categorized as a national general aviation facility.

Southern Wisconsin Regional Airport was once home to the annual Southern Wisconsin AirFEST.

== History ==
Several Rock County farms provided land for contract glider pilot training to the United States Army Air Forces in 1942. Training was provided by Morey Airplane Company using three turf runway locations in three township sections. C-47 Skytrains and Waco CG-4 unpowered Gliders were not used. The production CG-4A gliders were not delivered until after these northern civilian schools were closed. Aircraft furnished by the Army were single-engine L-type Cessnas, Aeronca and Piper. There were no gliders and there was no glider towing. These schools became known as dead stick training.

The mission of the school was to train glider pilot students in approaches with the engine off, landing at a mark, night landing and strange field landing. Ground school instruction was in navigation, maintenance, meteorology, instruments, aircraft identification, chemical warfare defense, customs of service, and physical training and drill.

These schools were inactivated at the end of 1942 or sooner. The farm fields used in Rock County were turned back to the farmers when the schools were closed. None of this glider pilot training in Rock County occurred at or on the current Southern Wisconsin Regional Airport space.

SWRA has, in the past, had scheduled airline passenger service. Wisconsin Central Airlines (later North Central and Republic) began service May 14, 1950. In 1979, it had service to Chicago-O'Hare on Republic Airlines and Midstate Airlines. Republic's service ended October,1981; Midstate's service began April 15, 1979 and ended December 31, 1979. Mid-Continent Airlines (later American Central Airlines) began service October 1, 1981, which ended July 25, 1985.

== Facilities and aircraft ==
Southern Wisconsin Regional Airport covers an area of 1,343 acres (543 ha) at an elevation of 808 feet (246 m) above mean sea level. It contains three runways:

- Runway 14/32: 7,302 x 150 ft (2,226 x 46 m), surface: concrete, with approved ILS and GPS approaches
- Runway 4/22: 6,701 x 150 ft (2,042 x 46 m), surface: asphalt, with approved ILS and GPS approaches
- Runway 18/36: 5,004 x 75 ft (1,525 x 23 m), surface: asphalt

For the 12-month period ending December 31, 2021, the airport had 54,744 aircraft operations, an average of 150 per day: 90% general aviation, 10% air taxi and less than 1% military. In August 2024, there were 87 aircraft based at this airport: 45 single-engine, 5 multi-engine, 33 jet and 4 helicopters.

The airport has an FBO that offers fuel as well as hangar parking, catering, courtesy cars, a conference room, a crew lounge, snooze rooms, and more.

== Southern Wisconsin AirFest ==
The Southern Wisconsin AirFest was an annual air show that hosted North American jet teams, such as the Blue Angels, the Thunderbirds and the Masters of Disaster. The event was discontinued following the 2012 season.

=== Headliners ===
- 2003: The U.S. Air Force Thunderbirds were scheduled to perform but, due to an accident in late September, they were unable to perform at the show. In their place was the CF-18 Hornet
- 2004: U.S. Air Force Thunderbirds
- 2005: U.S. Navy Blue Angels
- 2006: U.S. Air Force F-16 Viper East Demo Team
- 2007: U.S. Air Force F-16 Viper East Demo Team and Codename: Mary's Lamb
- 2008: Canadian Armed Forces Snowbirds
- 2009: U.S. Navy Blue Angels
- 2010: U.S. Air Force Thunderbirds and Canadian Armed Forces Snowbirds
- 2011: VFA-122 Super Hornet West Coast Demo Team
- 2012: United States Army Golden Knights Parachute Team and Black Diamond Jet Team

== Accidents & Incidents ==
- On August 27, 1999, a Walker Breezy was destroyed on takeoff when it impacted terrain. The aircraft was starting on a cross-country flight to Beloit, Wisconsin. Witnesses say the plane climbed steeply and began a left turn. The plane then turned back to the right and fishtailed, poirposed, and began another right turn before pitching straight down and impacting terrain. The airline transport pilot onboard was fatally injured.
- On February 16, 2021, a homebuilt Velocity V-Twin crashed after departure from Janesville. The plane had originally arrived from Appleton International Airport and departed for Florida after refueling. Roughly one minute from departure, the plane's pilots requested a return to the airport. The plane eventually crashed into trees one mile south of the airport in a reported steep dive. The aircraft received substantial damage and both pilots onboard died.

== See also ==
- Wisconsin World War II Army Airfields
- 31st Flying Training Wing (World War II)
- List of airports in Wisconsin

== Other sources ==
- This article incorporates public domain material from the Air Force Historical Research Agency
- Manning, Thomas A. (2005), History of Air Education and Training Command, 1942–2002. Office of History and Research, Headquarters, AETC, Randolph AFB, Texas OCLC 71006954, 29991467
- Shaw, Frederick J. (2004), Locating Air Force Base Sites, History’s Legacy, Air Force History and Museums Program, United States Air Force, Washington DC. OCLC 57007862, 1050653629
- 1943 Glider Program Studies, USAF Historical Studies, Maxwell.
