= Big Foot Airfield =

Airport in Wisconsin, United States

- IATA: none; ICAO: none; FAA LID: 7V3

Summary
- Airport type: Public
- Serves: Walworth, Wisconsin
- Opened: October 1958
- Time zone: CST (UTC−06:00)
  - Summer (DST): CDT (UTC−05:00)
- Elevation AMSL: 948 ft (289 m)
- Coordinates: 42°31′39″N 088°39′05″W

Map
- Location of airport in Wisconsin 7V3 (the United States)

Runways
Direction	Length		Surface
Direction	ft	m	Surface
18/36	2,114	644	Turf

Statistics
- Aircraft operations (2024): 4,000
- Based aircraft (2024): 12
- Source: Federal Aviation Administration

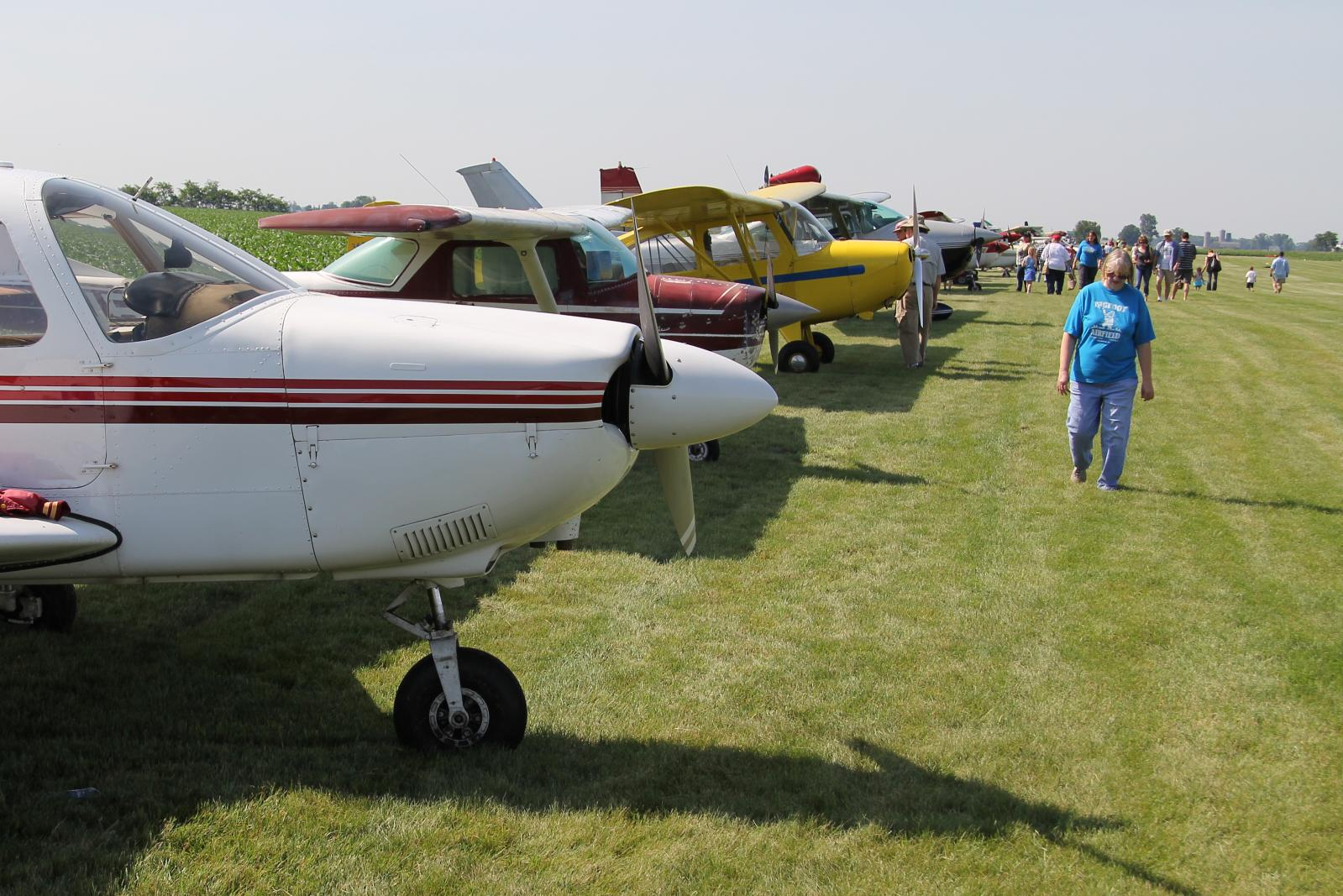
Planes at the 2011 Big Foot Airfield Fly-In

Big Foot Airfield, (FAA LID: 7V3) is a privately owned public use airport located 3 miles (4.8 km) west of the central business district of Walworth, a village in Walworth County, Wisconsin, United States.

Although most airports in the United States use the same three-letter location identifier for the FAA and International Air Transport Association (IATA), this airport is assigned 7V3 by the FAA but has no designation from the IATA.

The airport does not have scheduled airline service, the closest airport with scheduled airline service is Chicago Rockford International Airport, about 32 miles (51 km) to the southwest.

== Facilities and aircraft ==
Big Foot Airfield covers an area of 12 acres (4.9 ha) at an elevation of 948 feet (289 m) above mean sea level. It has one runway: 18/36 is 2,114 by 100 feet (644 x 30 m) with a turf surface.

For the 12-month period ending May 15, 2024, the airport had 4,000 aircraft operations, an average of 77 per week; all general aviation. In July 2024, there were 12 aircraft based at this airport: all 12 single-engine.

== See also ==
- List of airports in Wisconsin
