= Heritage Acres Airport =

- IATA: none; ICAO: none; FAA LID: 90WI

Summary
- Airport type: Private
- Serves: Laona, Wisconsin
- Opened: February 1982
- Time zone: CST (UTC−06:00)
  - Summer (DST): CDT (UTC−05:00)
- Elevation AMSL: 1,608 ft (490 m)
- Coordinates: 45°34′30″N 088°42′30″W

Map
- Location of airport in Wisconsin 90WI (the United States)

Runways
Direction	Length		Surface
Direction	ft	m	Surface
15/33	3,000	914	Turf

Statistics
- Based aircraft (2024): 0
- Source: Federal Aviation Administration

Heritage Acres Airport, (FAA LID: 90WI) is a privately owned airport located 2 miles (3.2 km) northwest of the central business district of Laona, a town in Forest County, Wisconsin, United States.

Although most airports in the United States use the same three-letter location identifier for the FAA and International Air Transport Association (IATA), this airport is assigned 90WI by the FAA but has no designation from the IATA.

== Facilities and aircraft ==
Heritage Acres Airport covers an area of 10 acres (4.0 ha) at an elevation of 1,608 feet (490 m) above mean sea level. It has one grass runway: 15/33 is 3,000 by 150 feet (914 x 46 m).

In August 2024, there were no aircraft based at this airport.

== See also ==
- List of airports in Wisconsin
