= Grand Geneva Resort Airport =

Airport in Wisconsin, United States

- IATA: XES; ICAO: none; FAA LID: C02

Summary
- Airport type: Public
- Owner: Grand Geneva Resort
- Serves: Lake Geneva, Wisconsin
- Time zone: CST (UTC−06:00)
  - Summer (DST): CDT (UTC−05:00)
- Elevation AMSL: 835 ft (255 m)
- Coordinates: 42°36′53″N 088°23′24″W

Map
- Location of airport in Wisconsin C02 (the United States)

Runways
Direction	Length		Surface
Direction	ft	m	Surface
5/23	4,100	1,250	Asphalt

Statistics
- Aircraft operations (2024): 150
- Based aircraft (2024): 0
- Source: Federal Aviation Administration

Grand Geneva Resort Airport, (IATA: XES, FAA LID: C02) was a privately owned public use airport located 2 miles (3 km) northeast of the central business district of Lake Geneva, Wisconsin, a city in Walworth County, Wisconsin, United States.

This airport was assigned C02 by the FAA and XES by the IATA but had no designation from the International Civil Aviation Organization.

== History ==
Grand Geneva Resort was built as the Lake Geneva Playboy Club Hotel in 1968, and the airport was marked on the FAA Sectional Aeronautical Chart as Playboy. Commuter air service was available directly from Chicago O'Hare Airport.

== Facilities and aircraft ==
Grand Geneva Resort Airport covered an area of 20 acres (8 ha) at an elevation of 835 feet (255 m) above mean sea level. It had one runway: 5/23 is 4,100 by 75 feet (1,250 x 23 m) with an asphalt surface, and had an approved GPS approach.

For the 12-month period ending May 15, 2024, the airport had 150 aircraft operations: 67% general aviation and 33% air taxi. In July 2024, there were no aircraft based at this airport.

== Closure and demolition ==
A NOTAM (Notice to Airmen) dated December 02, 2024 was issued stating that the airport was permanently closed. Demolition of the runway was subsequently performed and a new driving range was installed on the former runway 05 threshold, facing northeast down the length of the former runway.

== See also ==
- List of airports in Wisconsin
