= Wild Rose Idlewild Airport =

Airport in Wisconsin, United States

- IATA: none; ICAO: none; FAA LID: W23

Summary
- Airport type: Public
- Owner: Village of Wild Rose
- Serves: Wild Rose, Wisconsin
- Opened: October 1982
- Time zone: CST (UTC−06:00)
  - Summer (DST): CDT (UTC−05:00)
- Elevation AMSL: 908 ft (277 m)
- Coordinates: 44°11′52″N 089°13′04″W

Map
- Location of airport in Wisconsin W23 (the United States)

Runways
Direction	Length		Surface
Direction	ft	m	Surface
9/27	2,990	911	Turf
18/36	1,695	517	Turf

Statistics
- Aircraft operations (2021): 1,500
- Based aircraft (2024): 17
- Source: Federal Aviation Administration

Wild Rose Idlewild Airport, (FAA LID: W23) is a public use airport 2 miles (3.2 km) northeast of the central business district of Wild Rose, a village in Waushara County, Wisconsin, United States.

Although most airports in the United States use the same three-letter location identifier for the FAA and International Air Transport Association (IATA), this airport is assigned W23 by the FAA but has no designation from the IATA.

The airport does not have scheduled airline service; the closest airport with scheduled airline service is Appleton International Airport, about 35 miles (56 km) to the east.

== Facilities and aircraft ==
Wild Rose Idlewild Airport covers an area of 100 acres (40 ha) at an elevation of 908 feet (277 m) above mean sea level. It has two runways: 9/27 is 2,990 by 100 feet (911 x 30 m) with a turf surface and 18/36 is 1,695 by 100 feet (517 x 30 m) also with a turf surface.

For the 12-month period ending August 31, 2021, the airport had 1,500 aircraft operations, an average of 4 per day, all general aviation. In July 2024, there were 17 aircraft based at this airport: 11 single-engine and 6 ultralight.

== See also ==
- List of airports in Wisconsin
