= Door County Cherryland Airport =

Airport in Wisconsin, United States

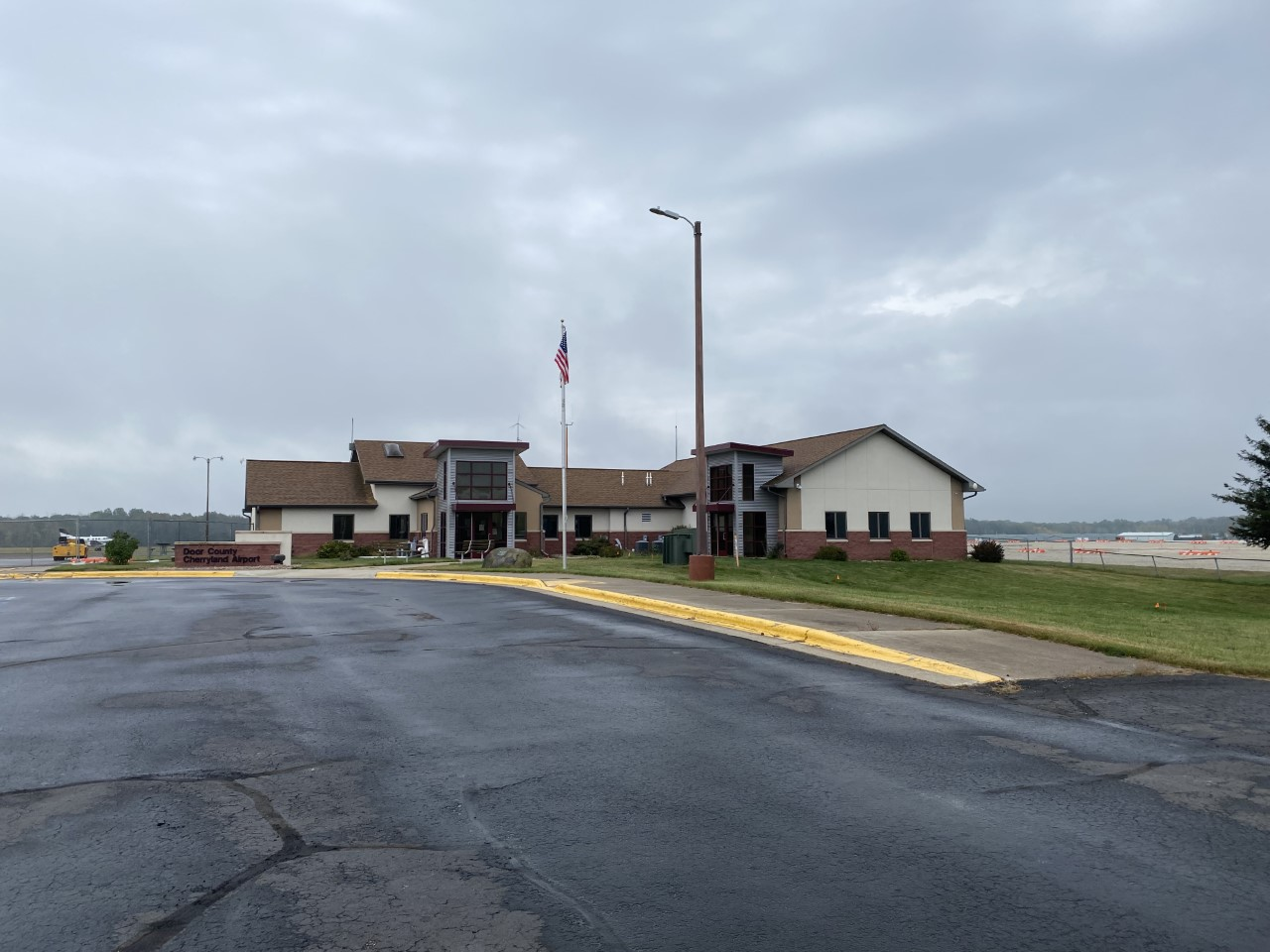
- Airport Terminal.
- IATA: SUE; ICAO: KSUE; FAA LID: SUE

Summary
- Airport type: Public
- Owner: Door County
- Serves: Sturgeon Bay, Wisconsin
- Opened: March 1940
- Time zone: CST (UTC−06:00)
  - Summer (DST): CDT (UTC−05:00)
- Elevation AMSL: 724 ft (221 m)
- Coordinates: 44°50′37″N 087°25′18″W
- Website: map.co.door.wi.us/airport/

Map
- Location of airport in Wisconsin SUE (the United States)

Runways
Direction	Length		Surface
Direction	ft	m	Surface
2/20	4,599	1,402	Asphalt
10/28	3,199	975	Asphalt

Statistics
- Aircraft operations (2021): 23,150
- Based aircraft (2024): 45
- Source: Federal Aviation Administration

Door County Cherryland Airport (IATA: SUE, ICAO: KSUE, FAA LID: SUE) is a county-owned public-use airport in Door County, Wisconsin, United States. It is located two nautical miles (4 km) west of the central business district of Sturgeon Bay, Wisconsin. It is included in the Federal Aviation Administration (FAA) National Plan of Integrated Airport Systems for 2025–2029, in which it is categorized as a local general aviation facility.

Door County Cherryland Airport is home to the Door County Civil Air Patrol Composite Squadron (WI-197). The Experimental Aircraft Association (EAA) Chapter 630, Peninsula Flyers, are also based at the airfield.

== History ==
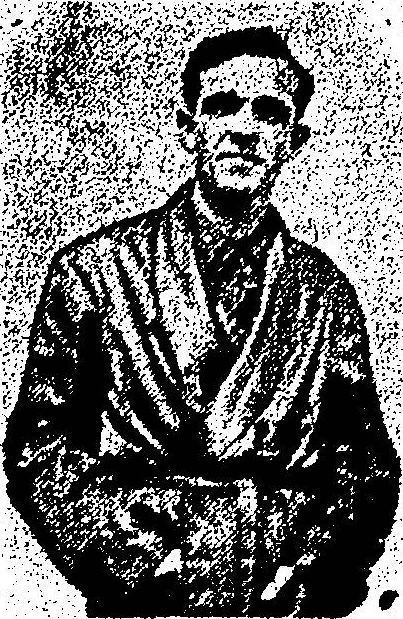
McCann

The airport was officially opened in 1939. To celebrate, a performer known as Dare Devil McCann was buried and then dug up again ten days later. During his confinement, he was fed milk through a tube and attended by a nurse. Visitors could pay to view him in the casket. This was the first time a "buried alive for ten days" type stunt was performed in the state. Other attractions included an air show and a parachute jump.

== Facilities and aircraft ==
Door County Cherryland Airport covers an area of 436 acres (176 ha) at an elevation of 724 feet (221 m) above mean sea level. It has two asphalt paved runways: the primary runway 2/20 is 4,599 by 75 feet (1,402 x 23 m) and the crosswind runway 10/28 is 3,199 by 75 feet (975 x 23 m), all having approved GPS approaches.

For the 12-month period ending September 14, 2021, the airport had 23,150 aircraft operations, an average of 63 per day: 97% general aviation, 2% air taxi and 1% military. In August 2024, there were 45 aircraft based at this airport: 39 single-engine, 4 multi-engine, 1 jet and 1 helicopter.

== Incidents ==
On April 2, 2012, an 81-year-old pilot was flying with his wife when he lost consciousness and ultimately died in mid-air. His 80-year-old wife took over the controls of the plane and successfully landed it at Door County Cherryland Airport. Her husband was pronounced dead on scene.

== Climate ==
Door County Cherryland Airport

Climate chart (precipitation, max. and min. temperature)
J	F	M	A	M	J	J	A	S	O	N	D
57 −6 −8	54 −8 −15	60 1 −4	129 9 −2	93 13 3	85 18 9	97 21 12	78 20 15	87 19 12	129 11 3	85 7 1	65 −2 −2
- █ Average max. and min. temperatures in °C
- █ Precipitation totals in mm
Imperial conversion
J	F	M	A	M	J	J	A	S	O	N	D
2.2 21 18	2.1 18 5	2.4 34 25	5.1 48 28	3.7 55 37	3.3 64 48	3.8 70 54	3.1 68 59	3.4 66 54	5.1 52 37	3.3 45 34	2.6 28 28
- █ Average max. and min. temperatures in °F
- █ Precipitation totals in inches

== Images ==
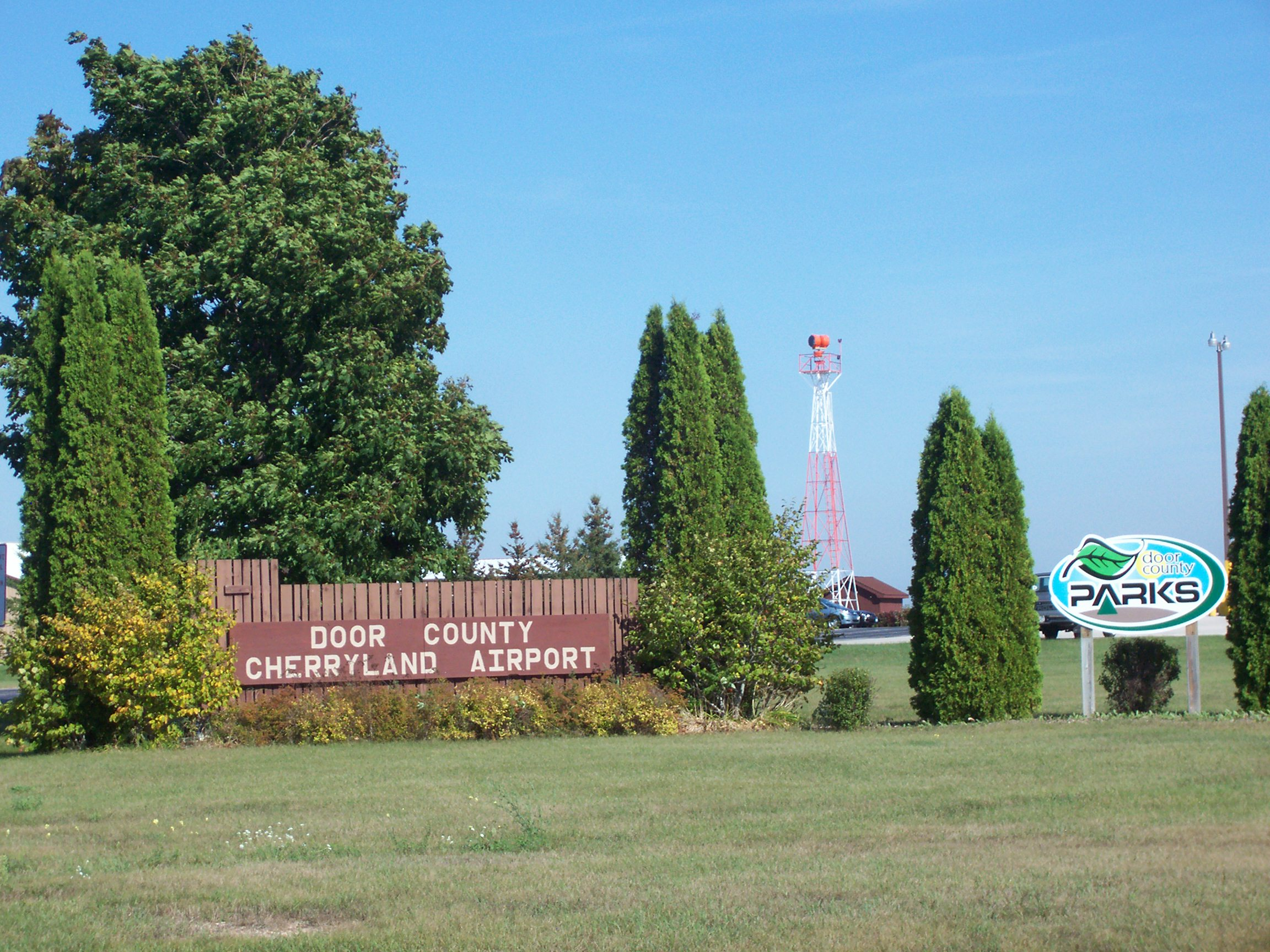
Sign at airport entrance

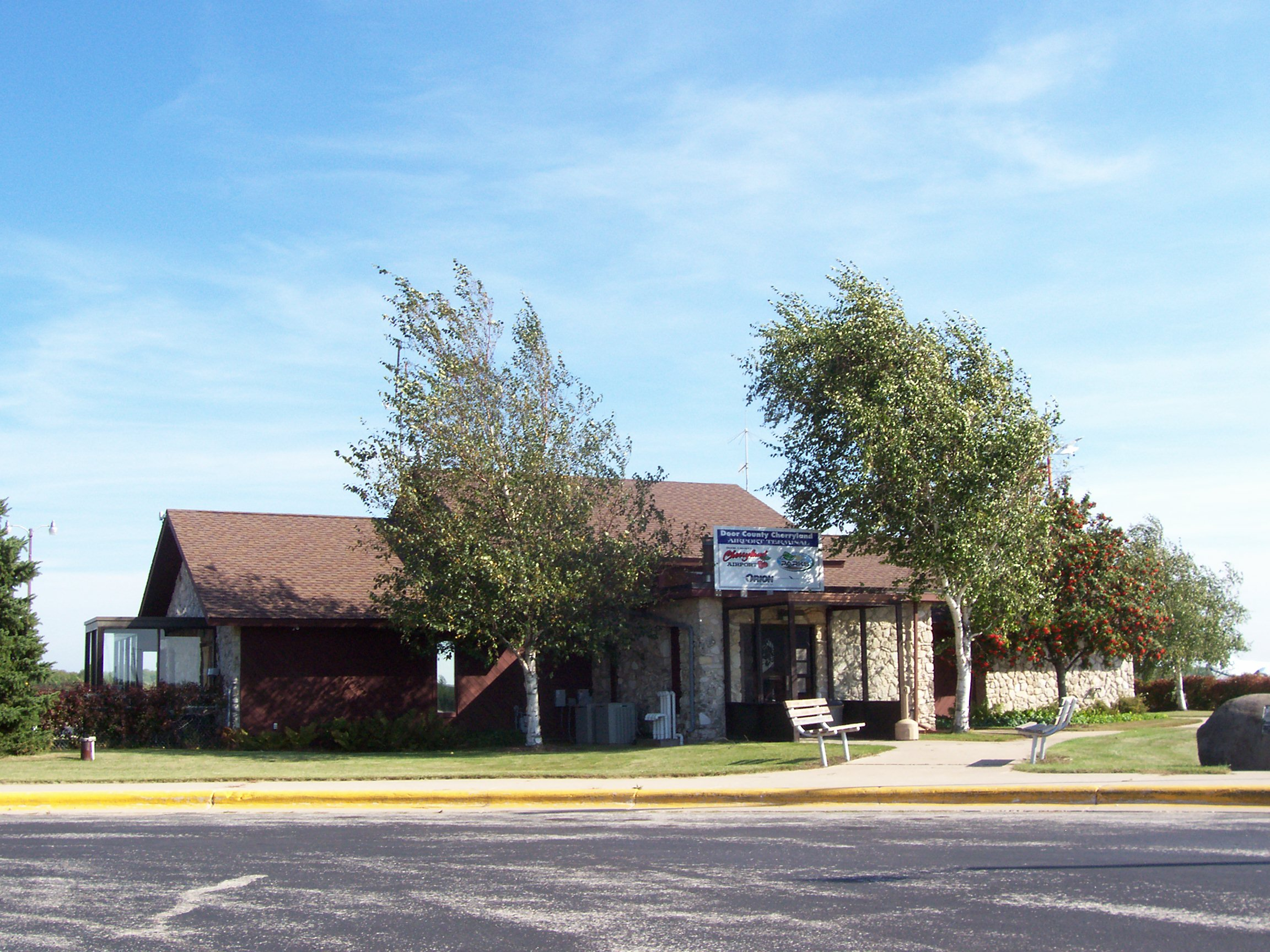
Old airport terminal building

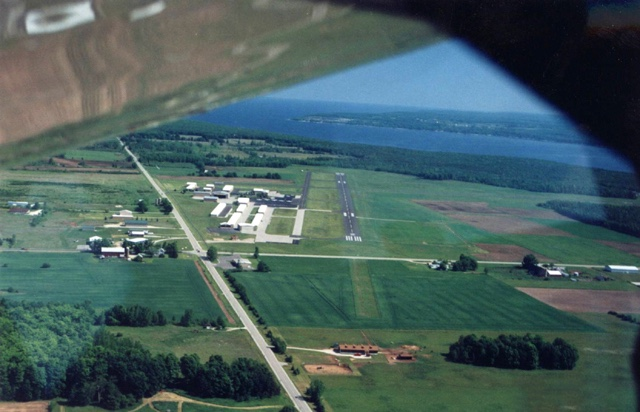
Runway from the air

== See also ==
- List of airports in Wisconsin
