= South Wood County Airport =

South Wood County Airport Alexander Field
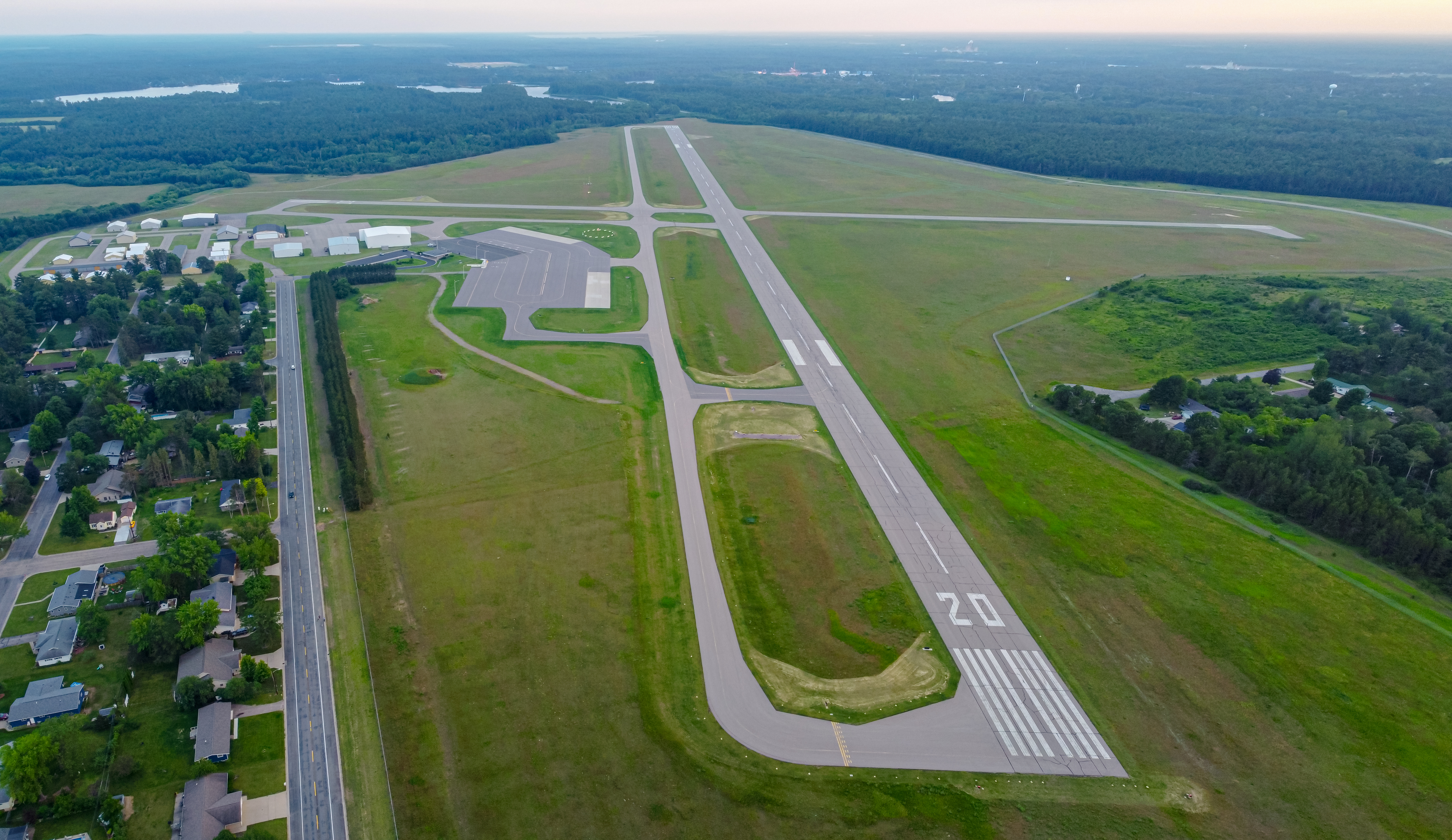
- IATA: ISW; ICAO: KISW; FAA LID: ISW

Summary
- Airport type: Public
- Owner/Operator: City of Wisconsin Rapids; Town of Grand Rapids; City of Nekoosa; Village of Port Edwards
- Location: Port Edwards, Wisconsin
- Opened: November 1959
- Time zone: CST (UTC−06:00)
  - Summer (DST): CDT (UTC−05:00)
- Elevation AMSL: 1,021 ft (311 m)
- Coordinates: 44°21′37″N 089°50′21″W
- Website: South Wood County Airport

Map
- Location of airport in Wisconsin ISW (the United States)

Runways
Direction	Length		Surface
Direction	ft	m	Surface
2/20	5,500	1,676	Asphalt
12/30	3,470	1,058	Asphalt
18/36	2,072	632	Turf

Statistics
- Aircraft operations (2024): 11,550
- Based aircraft (2024): 33
- Source: Federal Aviation Administration

South Wood County Airport (IATA: ISW, ICAO: KISW, FAA LID: ISW), also known as Alexander Field, is a public use airport located one nautical mile (1.85 km) south of the central business district of Wisconsin Rapids, a city in Wood County, Wisconsin, United States.

The airport is owned and operated by the City of Wisconsin Rapids, the Village of Port Edwards, the Town of Grand Rapids and the City of Nekoosa. It is included in the Federal Aviation Administration (FAA) National Plan of Integrated Airport Systems for 2025–2029, in which it is categorized as a local general aviation facility.

== History ==
Alexander Field was built for Nekoosa Edwards Paper Company subsidiary Tri-Cities Airways in October 1928 and named after its executive John Alexander. Governor Fred R. Zimmerman and Walter J. Kohler opened the airport with an airshow that featured air-to-air refueling. A Ford Trimotor was based at the field and was used for company business and community events. During World War II, the airfield saw service as a National Guard station and POW camp for German prisoners. In 1961 the ownership was transferred to Wood County.

== Facilities and aircraft ==
South Wood County Airport covers an area of 435 acres (176 ha) at an elevation of 1,021 feet (311 m) above mean sea level. It has three runways:

- Runway 2/20: 5,500 by 100 feet (1,676 x 30 m), asphalt, GPS, SDF, and NDB equipped approaches.
- Runway 12/30: 3,470 by 60 feet (1,058 x 18 m), asphalt, approved NDB approach.
- Runway 18/36: 2,072 by 50 feet (632 x 15 m), turf

Wisconsin Rapids (ISW) non-directional beacon, 215 kHz, is located on field.

For the 12-month period ending June 11, 2024, the airport had 11,550 aircraft operations, an average of 32 per day: 91% general aviation, 9% air taxi and less than 1% military. In August 2024, there were 33 aircraft based at this airport: 29 single-engine and 4 multi-engine.

== See also ==
- List of airports in Wisconsin
