= Fox River Airport =

Airport in Rochester, Wisconsin, United States

- IATA: none; ICAO: none; FAA LID: 27WI

Summary
- Airport type: Private
- Serves: Rochester, Wisconsin
- Opened: October 1970; 55 years ago
- Time zone: CST (UTC−06:00)
  - Summer (DST): CDT (UTC−05:00)
- Elevation AMSL: 822 ft (251 m)
- Coordinates: 42°45′03″N 088°15′01″W
- Website: Burlington.gov/airport

Map
- Location of airport in Wisconsin 27WI (the United States)

Runways
Direction	Length		Surface
Direction	ft	m	Surface
18/36	2,506	764	Asphalt

Statistics
- Aircraft operations (2021): 5,000
- Based aircraft (2024): 0
- Source: Federal Aviation Administration

Fox River Airport (FAA LID: 27WI) is a private use airport located 2 miles (3.2 km) northwest of the central business district of Rochester, a city in Racine County, Wisconsin, United States.

Although most U.S. airports use the same three-letter location identifier for the FAA and IATA, Fox River Airport is assigned 27WI by the FAA but has no designation from the IATA.

The airport does not have scheduled airline service. The closest airport with scheduled airline service is Milwaukee Mitchell International Airport in Milwaukee, about 22 miles (35 km) to the northeast.

== Facilities and aircraft ==
Fox River Airport covers an area of 20 acres (8.1 ha) at an elevation of 822 feet (251 m) above mean sea level. It has one runway: 18/36 is 2,506 by 36 feet (764 x 11 m), with an asphalt surface.

For the 12-month period ending May 5, 2021, the airport had 5,000 aircraft operations, an average of 13 per day: 100% general aviation. In August 2024, there were no aircraft based at this airport.

== See also ==
- List of airports in Wisconsin
