= Barron Municipal Airport =

Airport in Wisconsin, United States

- IATA: none; ICAO: none; FAA LID: 9Y7

Summary
- Airport type: Public
- Owner: City of Barron
- Serves: Barron, Wisconsin
- Opened: October 1946
- Time zone: CST (UTC−06:00)
  - Summer (DST): CDT (UTC−05:00)
- Elevation AMSL: 1,113 ft (339 m)
- Coordinates: 45°24′27″N 091°50′04″W

Map
- Location of airport in Wisconsin 9Y7 (the United States)

Runways
| Direction | Length | | Surface |
| Direction | ft | m | Surface |
|---|---|---|---|
| 9/27 | 2,010 | 613 | Turf |

Statistics
- Aircraft operations (2022): 6,550
- Based aircraft (2024): 18
- Source: Federal Aviation Administration

Barron Municipal Airport, (FAA LID: 9Y7) is a city owned public use airport located in the central business district of Barron, a city in Barron County, Wisconsin, United States.

Although most airports in the United States use the same three-letter location identifier for the FAA and International Air Transport Association (IATA), this airport is assigned 9Y7 by the FAA but has no designation from the IATA.

The airport does not have scheduled airline service, the closest airport with scheduled airline service is Chippewa Valley Regional Airport, about 40 miles (64 km) to the southeast.

== Facilities and aircraft ==
Barron Municipal Airport covers an area of 29 acres (12 ha) at an elevation of 1,113 feet (339 m) above mean sea level. It has one turf runway: 9/27 is 2,010 by 260 feet (613 x 79 m).

For the 12-month period ending August 4, 2022, the airport had 6,550 aircraft operations, an average of 126 per week; 99% general aviation and 1% air taxi.

In August 2024, there were 18 aircraft based at this airport: 17 single-engine and 1 ultralight.

== See also ==
- List of airports in Wisconsin
