= Portage Municipal Airport =

- IATA: none; ICAO: none; FAA LID: C47

Summary
- Airport type: Public
- Owner: City of Portage
- Serves: Portage, Wisconsin
- Opened: October 1941
- Time zone: CST (UTC−06:00)
  - Summer (DST): CDT (UTC−05:00)
- Elevation AMSL: 825 ft / 251 m
- Coordinates: 43°33′37″N 089°28′58″W

Map
- Location of airport in Wisconsin C47 (the United States)

Runways
Direction	Length		Surface
Direction	ft	m	Surface
18/36	3,770	1,149	Asphalt
4/22	2,668	813	Asphalt

Statistics
- Aircraft operations (2023): 4,750
- Based aircraft (2024): 21
- Source: Federal Aviation Administration

Portage Municipal Airport (FAA LID: C47) is a city owned public use airport located two nautical miles (4 km) northwest of the central business district of Portage, a city in Columbia County, Wisconsin, United States. It is included in the Federal Aviation Administration (FAA) National Plan of Integrated Airport Systems for 2025–2029, in which it is categorized as a local general aviation facility.

== Facilities and aircraft ==
Portage Municipal Airport covers an area of 106 acres (43 ha) at an elevation of 825 feet (251 m) above mean sea level. It has two runways with asphalt surfaces: the primary runway 18/36 is 3,770 by 60 feet (1,149 x 18 m) and the crosswind runway 4/22 is 2,668 by 40 feet (813 x 12 m).

For the 12-month period ending June 7, 2023, the airport had 4,750 aircraft operations: 95% general aviation, 4% military and 1% air taxi.

In August 2024, there were 21 aircraft based at this airport: all 21 single-engine.

== See also ==
- List of airports in Wisconsin
