= Beloit Airport =

- IATA: none; ICAO: none; FAA LID: 44C

Summary
- Airport type: Public
- Owner: City of Beloit
- Serves: Beloit, Wisconsin
- Opened: October 1966
- Time zone: CST (UTC−06:00)
  - Summer (DST): CDT (UTC−05:00)
- Elevation AMSL: 817 ft (249 m)
- Coordinates: 42°29′52″N 088°58′03″W

Map
- Location of airport in Wisconsin 44C (the United States)

Runways
Direction	Length		Surface
Direction	ft	m	Surface
7/25	3,300	1,006	Asphalt

Statistics
- Aircraft operations (2022): 19,630
- Based aircraft (2024): 31
- Source: Federal Aviation Administration

Beloit Airport, (FAA LID: 44C) is a privately owned public use airport located 3 miles (4.8 km) east of the central business district of Beloit, a city in Rock County, Wisconsin, United States.

Although most airports in the United States use the same three-letter location identifier for the FAA and International Air Transport Association (IATA), this airport is assigned 44C by the FAA but has no designation from the IATA.

== Facilities and aircraft ==
Beloit Airport covers an area of 123 acres (50 ha) at an elevation of 817 feet (249 m) above mean sea level. It has one asphalt runway: 7/25 is 3,300 by 50 feet (1,006 x 15 m).

For the 12-month period ending June 9, 2022, the airport had 19,630 aircraft operations, an average of 54 per day; 99% general aviation, less than 1% air taxi and less than 1% military.

In July 2024, there were 31 aircraft based at this airport: 25 single-engine, 3 multi-engine, 1 helicopter and 2 ultralight.

== See also ==
- List of airports in Wisconsin
