= Eagle River Union Airport =

Airport in Wisconsin, United States

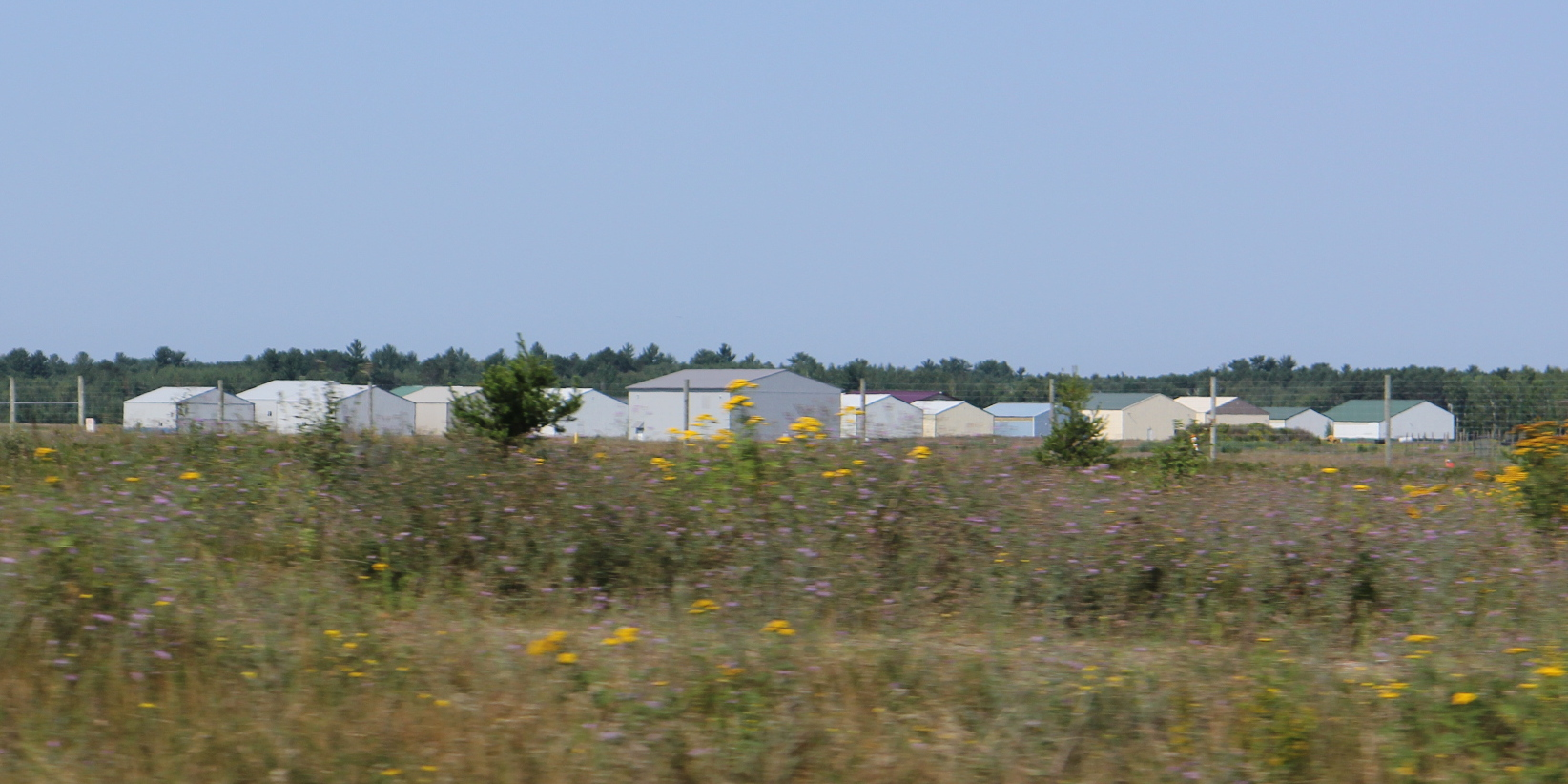
- IATA: EGV; ICAO: KEGV; FAA LID: EGV

Summary
- Airport type: Public
- Owner: City of Eagle River
- Serves: Eagle River, Wisconsin
- Opened: February 1938
- Time zone: CST (UTC−06:00)
  - Summer (DST): CDT (UTC−05:00)
- Elevation AMSL: 1,642.2 ft (500.5 m)
- Coordinates: 45°55′56″N 089°16′06″W
- Website: www.erairport.com

Map
- Location of airport in Wisconsin EGV (the United States)

Runways
Direction	Length		Surface
Direction	ft	m	Surface
4/22	5,000	1,524	Asphalt
13/31	3,400	1,036	Asphalt

Helipads
Number	Length		Surface
Number	ft	m	Surface
H1	60	18	Concrete

Statistics
- Aircraft operations (2023): 11,598
- Based aircraft (2024): 40
- Source: Federal Aviation Administration

Eagle River Union Airport (IATA: EGV, ICAO: KEGV, FAA LID: EGV) is a city owned public use airport located in Eagle River, a city in Vilas County, Wisconsin, United States. It is included in the Federal Aviation Administration (FAA) National Plan of Integrated Airport Systems for 2025–2029, in which it is categorized as a local general aviation facility.

== Facilities and aircraft ==
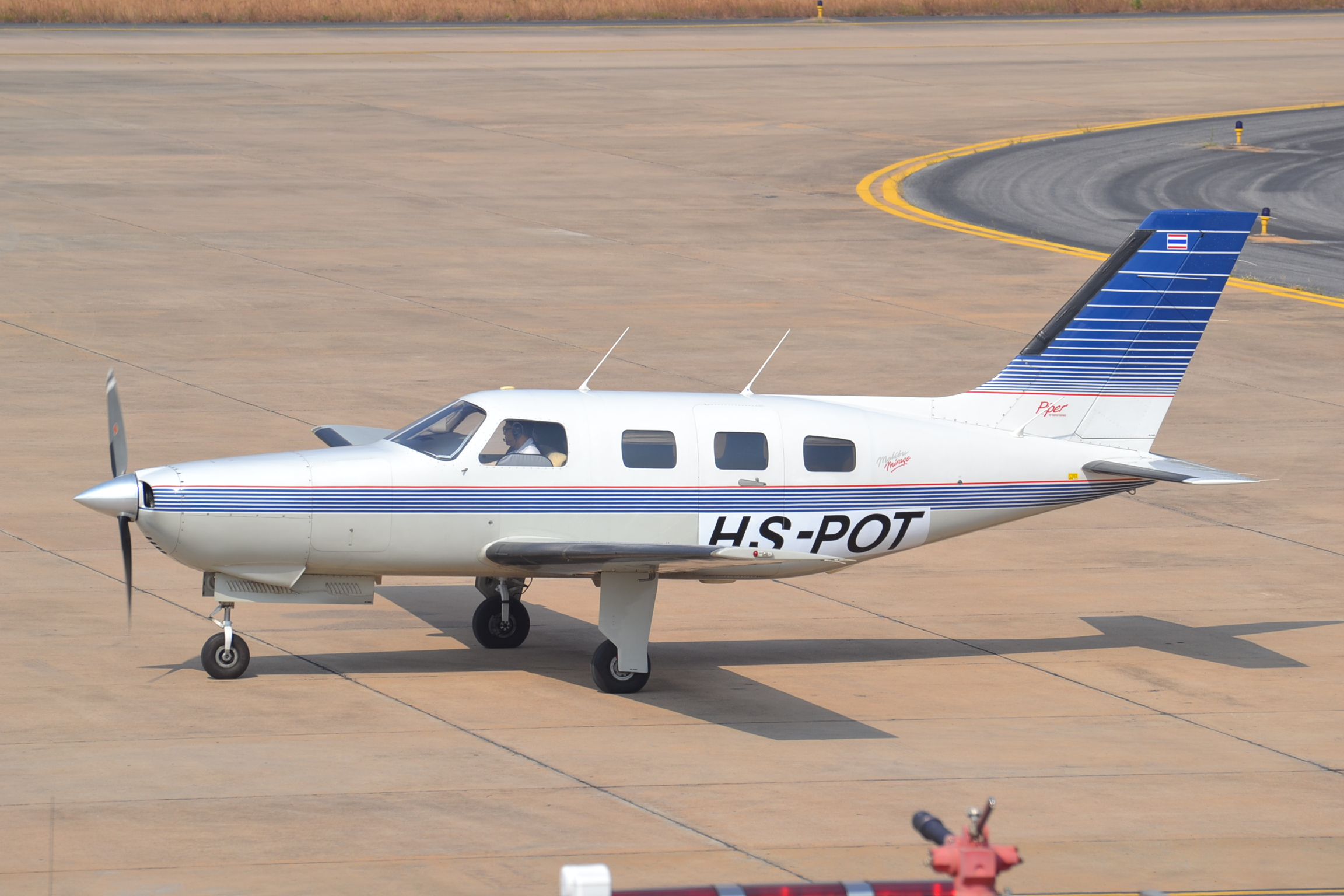
Piper M350

Eagle River Union Airport covers an area of 588 acres (238 ha) at an elevation of 1,642.2 feet (500.5 m) above mean sea level. It has two asphalt paved runways: the primary runway 4/22 is 5,000 by 76 feet (1,524 x 23 m) and the crosswind runway 13/31 is 3,400 by 60 feet (1,036 x 18 m). It also has one helipad designated H1 with a concrete surface measuring 60 by 60 feet (18 x 18 m). Runway 4/22 has approved GPS, LOC/DME and VOR/DME approaches.

For the 12-month period ending August 10, 2023, the airport had 11,598 aircraft operations, an average of 32 per day: 87% general aviation, 13% air taxi, less than 1% scheduled commercial and less than 1% military. In August 2024, there were 40 aircraft based at this airport: 35 single-engine, 2 multi-engine, 1 jet and 2 helicopter.

== See also ==
- List of airports in Wisconsin
