= Raymond, Wisconsin =

- Village
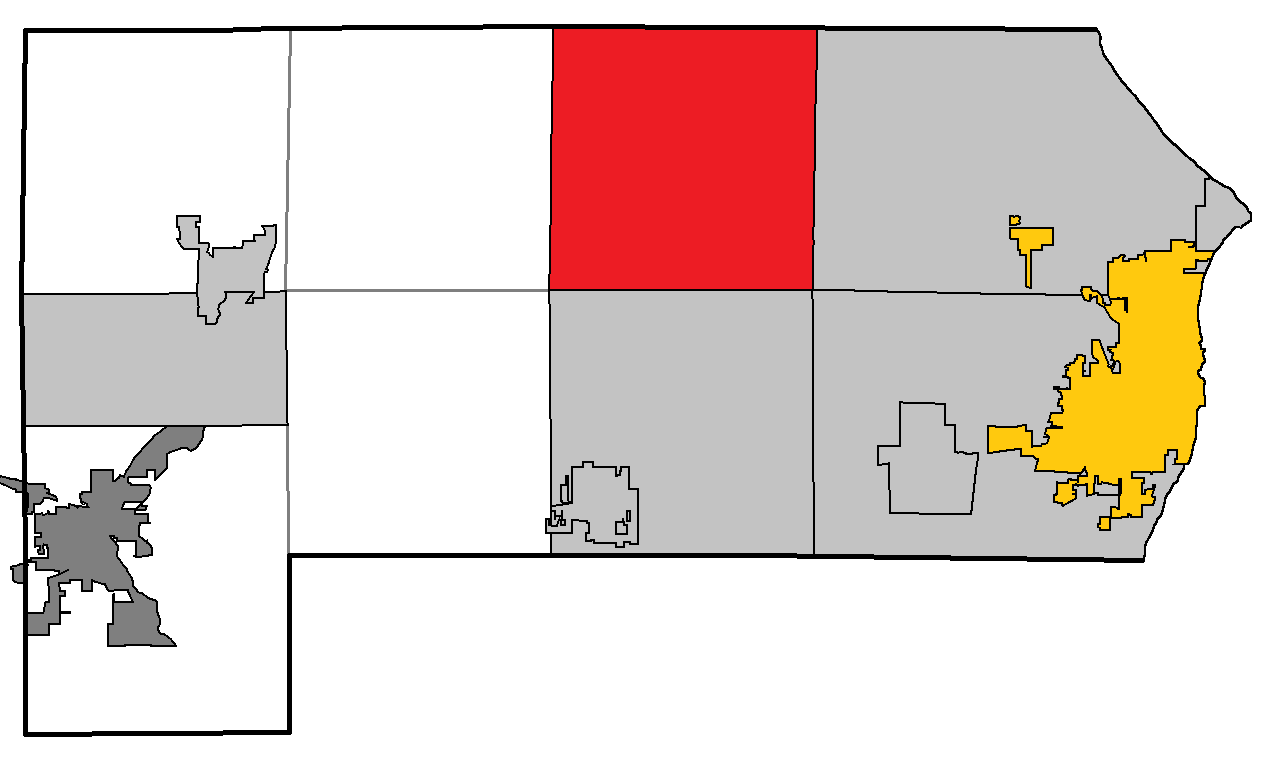
- Location of Raymond, within Racine County, Wisconsin
- Coordinates: 42°48′20″N 88°0′13″W
- Country: United States
- State: Wisconsin
- County: Racine

Area
  - Total: 35.6 sq mi (92.2 km^{2})
  - Land: 35.6 sq mi (92.1 km^{2})
  - Water: 0 sq mi (0.0 km^{2})
- Elevation: 741 ft (226 m)

Population (2020)
  - Total: 3,926
  - Density: 109.8/sq mi (42.38/km^{2})
- Time zone: UTC-6 (Central (CST))
  - Summer (DST): UTC-5 (CDT)
- Zip: 53161, 53162, 53164
- Area code: 262
- FIPS code: 55-66375
- GNIS feature ID: 1583999

Raymond is a village in Racine County, Wisconsin, United States. The population was 3,926 at the 2020 census. The unincorporated communities of Kneeland and Raymond are located in the town, as was the ghost town of Raymond Center. The unincorporated communities of North Cape and Union Church are also located partially in the town.

== Geography ==
According to the United States Census Bureau, the town has a total area of 35.6 square miles (92.2 km^{2}), of which 35.6 square miles (92.1 km^{2}) is land and 0.04 square mile (0.1 km^{2}) (0.06%) is water.

== Demographics ==
As of the census of 2000, there were 3,516 people, 1,245 households, and 998 families residing in the town. The population density was 98.8 people per square mile (38.2/km^{2}). There were 1,272 housing units at an average density of 35.8 per square mile (13.8/km^{2}). The racial makeup of the township was 97.95% White, 0.46% African American, 0.28% Native American, 0.51% Asian, 0.09% from other races, and 0.71% from two or more races. Hispanic or Latino of any race were 1.17% of the population.

There were 1,245 households, out of which 35.3% had children under the age of 18 living with them, 70.6% were married couples living together, 4.9% had a female householder with no husband present, and 19.8% were non-families. 15.4% of all households were made up of individuals, and 6.3% had someone living alone who was 65 years of age or older. The average household size was 2.82 and the average family size was 3.15.

In the town, the population was spread out, with 26.6% under the age of 18, 6.0% from 18 to 24, 29.6% from 25 to 44, 25.9% from 45 to 64, and 11.9% who were 65 years of age or older. The median age was 39 years. For every 100 females, there were 102.2 males. For every 100 females age 18 and over, there were 100.8 males.

The median income for a household in the town was $61,688, and the median income for a family was $65,513. Males had a median income of $43,813 versus $28,854 for females. The per capita income for the town was $24,801. About 2.7% of families and 3.1% of the population were below the poverty line, including 2.1% of those under age 18 and 5.0% of those age 65 or over.

== Switch to village ==
In 2019, the Town of Raymond voted to convert to a village. A special law passed to deal with disruptions caused by the promised Foxconn development permitted the town to change status easily without meeting the state's standard requirements for incorporation. (Village status prevents the annexation of portions of the town by neighboring municipalities and gives other powers to control development not available under town status.) Four years later, the Village hired its first village administrator, whose position absorbed the duties of the former village clerk.

== Notable people ==
- Stephen O. Bennett, Free Soil Party member of the Wisconsin State Assembly and Wisconsin State Senate.
- Martin E. Conlan, member of the South Dakota State Senate.
- John Hansen, Democratic Party member of the Wisconsin State Assembly.

== See also ==
- The "Racine County Jane Doe," a young woman whose body was discovered in 1999 in Raymond, was eventually identified as Peggy Johnson in November 2019.
