= Brennand Airport =

- IATA: none; ICAO: none; FAA LID: 79C

Summary
- Airport type: Public
- Serves: Neenah
- Opened: October 1967
- Time zone: CST (UTC−06:00)
  - Summer (DST): CDT (UTC−05:00)
- Elevation AMSL: 850 ft (260 m)
- Coordinates: 44°09′36″N 088°33′34″W
- Website: www.brennandairport.com

Map
- Location of airport in Wisconsin 79C (the United States)

Runways
Direction	Length		Surface
Direction	ft	m	Surface
18/36	2,450	747	Asphalt

Statistics
- Aircraft operations (2023): 14,550
- Based aircraft (2024): 31
- Source: Federal Aviation Administration

Brennand Airport, (FAA LID: 79C) is a privately owned public use airport located 4 miles (6.4 km) southwest of the central business district of Neenah, a city in Winnebago County, Wisconsin, United States about halfway between Appleton and Oshkosh. The airport is home to EAA Chapter 41.

Although most airports in the United States use the same three-letter location identifier for the FAA and International Air Transport Association (IATA), this airport is assigned 79C by the FAA but has no designation from the IATA.

== Facilities and aircraft ==
Brennand Airport covers an area of 25 acres (10 ha) at an elevation of 850 feet (259 m) above mean sea level. It has one asphalt runway: 18/36 is 2,450 by 20 feet (747 x 6 m).

For the 12-month period ending September 27, 2023, the airport had 14,550 aircraft operations, an average of 40 per day; greater than 99% general aviation and less than 1% air taxi. In July 2024, there were 31 aircraft based at this airport: 30 single-engine and 1 helicopter.

== See also ==
- List of airports in Wisconsin
