= Marshfield Municipal Airport (Wisconsin) =

Airport in Wisconsin, United States

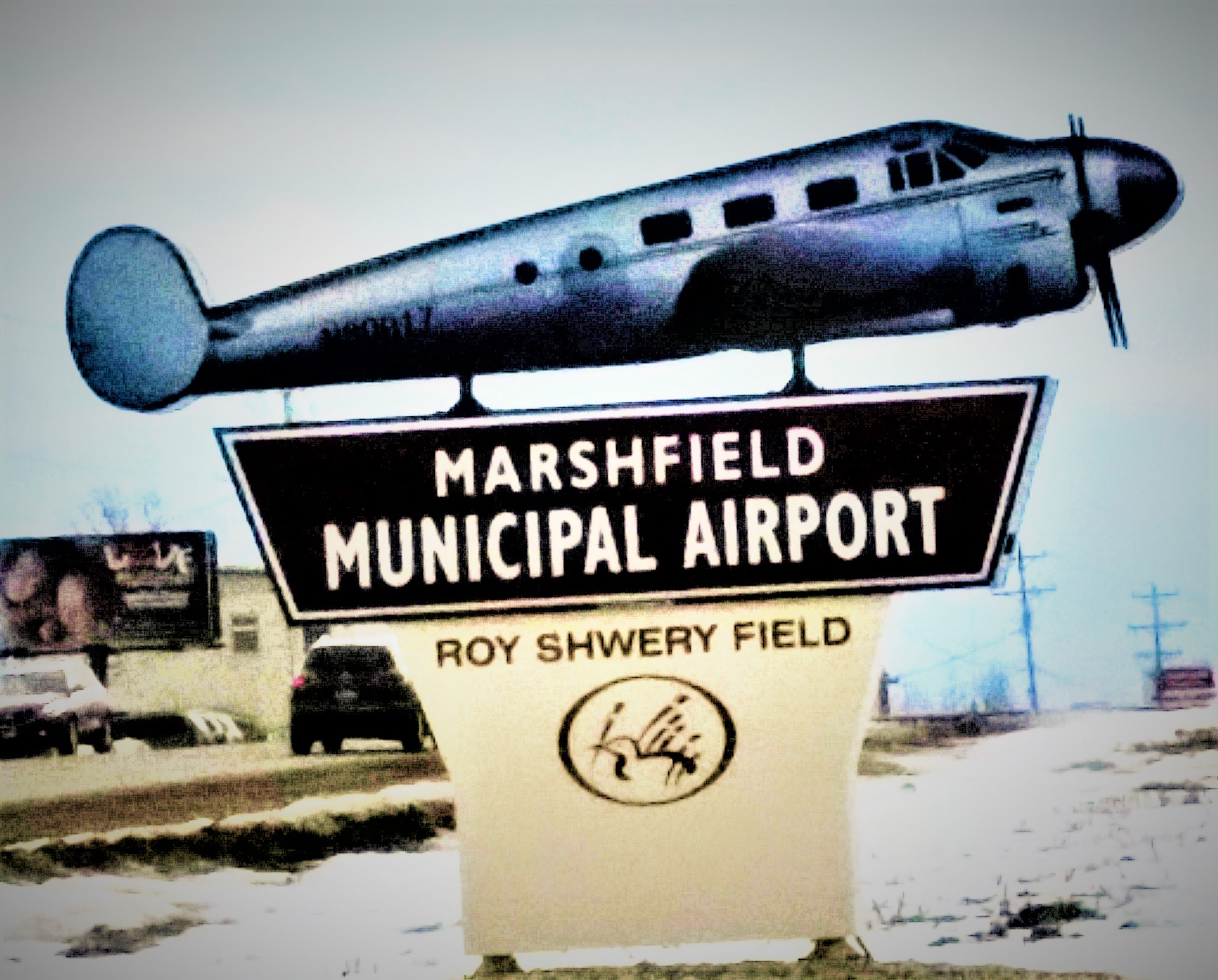
- IATA: MFI; ICAO: KMFI; FAA LID: MFI

Summary
- Airport type: Public
- Owner: City of Marshfield
- Serves: Marshfield, Wisconsin
- Opened: September 1945
- Time zone: CST (UTC−06:00)
  - Summer (DST): CDT (UTC−05:00)
- Elevation AMSL: 1,278 ft (390 m)
- Coordinates: 44°38′13″N 090°11′22″W

Map
- Location of airport in Wisconsin MFI (the United States)

Runways
Direction	Length		Surface
Direction	ft	m	Surface
16/34	5,002	1,525	Asphalt
5/23	3,597	1,096	Asphalt

Statistics
- Aircraft operations (2023): 23,050
- Based aircraft (2024): 16
- Source: Federal Aviation Administration

Marshfield Municipal Airport (IATA: MFI, ICAO: KMFI, FAA LID: MFI) is a city owned public use airport located one nautical mile (2 km) south of the central business district of Marshfield, a city in Wood County, Wisconsin, United States. It is included in the Federal Aviation Administration (FAA) National Plan of Integrated Airport Systems for 2025–2029, in which it is categorized as a local general aviation facility.

== Facilities and aircraft ==
Marshfield Municipal Airport covers an area of 552 acres (223 ha) at an elevation of 1,278 feet (390 m) above mean sea level. It has two asphalt paved runways: the primary runway 16/34 is 5,002 by 100 feet (1,525 x 30 m) with approved GPS and NDB approaches; the crosswind runway 5/23 is 3,597 by 100 feet (1,096 x 30 m) also with approved GPS and NDB approaches.

Starting in 2028, construction will begin on a 500-foot expansion to runway 16/34.

The non-directional beacon navigational aid associated with the airport is the Marshfield NDB (MFI), 391 kHz, which is located on the field.

For the 12-month period ending August 2, 2023, the airport had 23,050 aircraft operations, an average of 63 per day: 88% general aviation, 11% air taxi and less than 1% military. In August 2024, there were 16 aircraft based at this airport: 11 single-engine, 3 multi-engine, 1 jet and 1 helicopter.

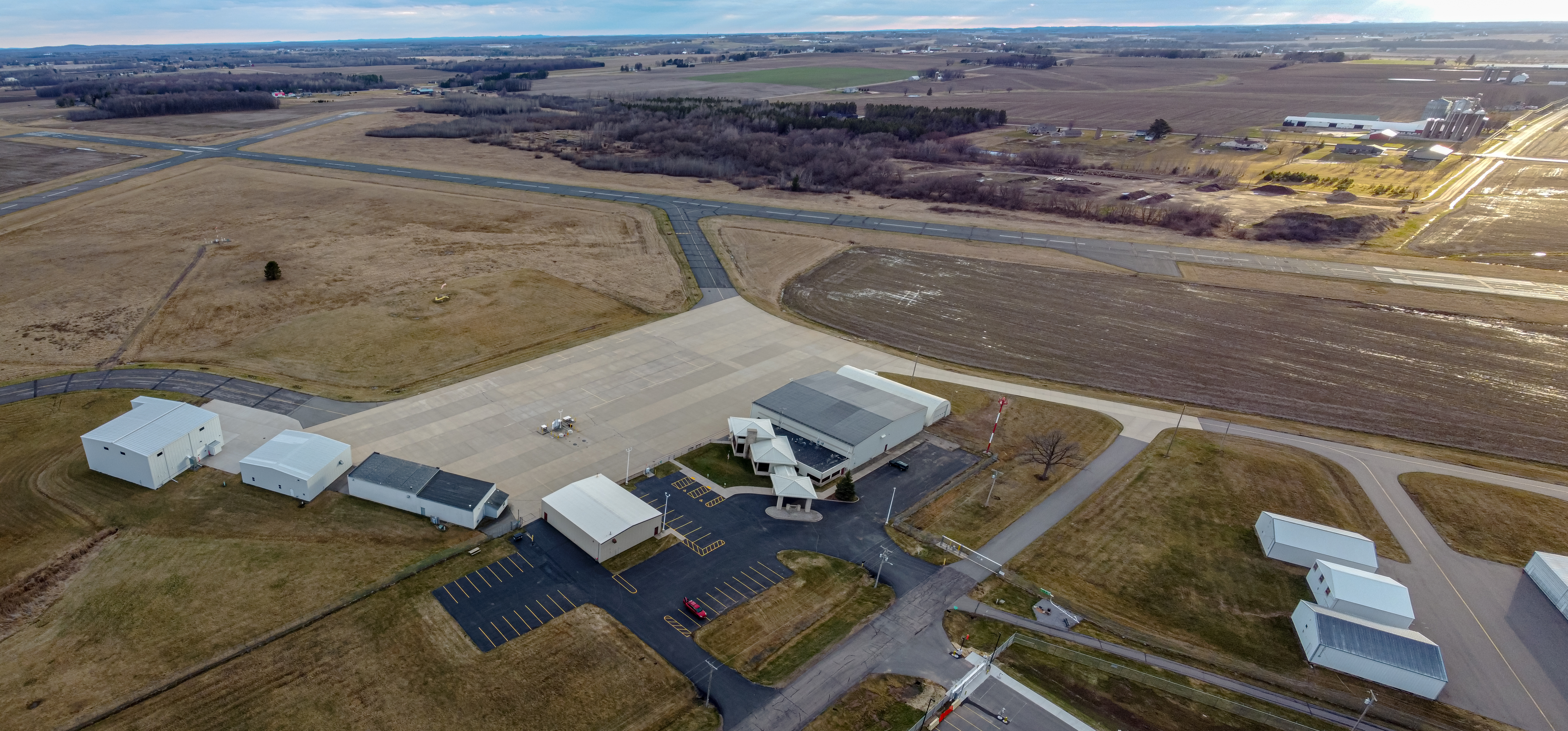

== See also ==
- List of airports in Wisconsin
