= Franksville, Wisconsin =

- Neighborhood
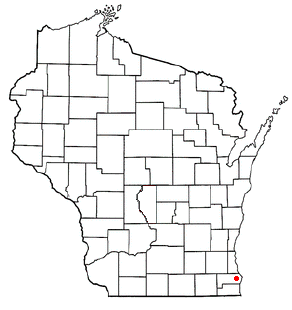
- Location of Franksville, Wisconsin
- Coordinates: 42°45′40″N 87°54′19″W
- Country: United States
- State: Wisconsin
- County: Racine

Area
  - Total: 4.3 sq mi (11.2 km^{2})
  - Land: 4.3 sq mi (11.2 km^{2})
  - Water: 0 sq mi (0.0 km^{2})
- Elevation: 728 ft (222 m)

Population (2000)
  - Total: 1,789
  - Density: 412/sq mi (159.2/km^{2})
- Time zone: UTC-6 (Central (CST))
  - Summer (DST): UTC-5 (CDT)
- ZIP Code: 53126
- Area code: 262
- FIPS code: 55-27425
- GNIS feature ID: 1565278

Franksville is a former census-designated place (CDP) in Racine County, Wisconsin, United States. The population was 1,789 at the 2000 census.

== History ==
Originally occupied by the Potowatomi tribe, the first white settlers in the area then known as Skunk Grove arrived in the 1830s. By the 1850s, plank roads were built through the area, and by the 1870s the Chicago, Milwaukee and St. Paul Railway (Milwaukee Road) laid tracks through the area and a plat was filed with Racine County. This track is now used by the Canadian Pacific Railway as the C&M Subdivision.

In 1907, the Frank Pure Food Company was established and built a plant in Franksville for the purpose of making sauerkraut. Contrary to popular belief, however, the company did not give Franksville its name, which had already been established. The name likely came from either Frank Brandecker, a surveyor who platted the area, or Frank Drandieker, a foreman of the crew that laid the railroad tracks through the area. In 1949, the company held the first Kraut Festival, which was originally a picnic for employees and friends, but later expanded to a four-day event. The festival's run ended in 2002, but was revived in 2015 as Kraut Music Fest.

Franksville became part of the newly established village of Caledonia on March 20, 2006.

== Geography ==
Franksville is located at 42°45′40″N 87°54′19″W (42.761085, -87.905173).

According to the United States Census Bureau, the CDP had a total area of 4.3 square miles (11.2 km^{2}), all land.

== Demographics ==
As of the census of 2000, there were 1,789 people, 651 households, and 531 families residing in the CDP. The population density was 412.4 people per square mile (159.2/km^{2}). There were 661 housing units at an average density of 152.4/sq mi (58.8/km^{2}). The racial makeup of the CDP was 96.76% White, 0.61% African American, 0.45% Native American, 0.95% Asian, 0.56% from other races, and 0.67% from two or more races. Hispanic or Latino of any race were 2.91% of the population.

There were 651 households, out of which 39.8% had children under the age of 18 living with them, 71.6% were married couples living together, 6.0% had a female householder with no husband present, and 18.4% were non-families. 14.3% of all households were made up of individuals, and 4.9% had someone living alone who was 65 years of age or older. The average household size was 2.75 and the average family size was 3.04.

In the CDP, the population was spread out, with 27.9% under the age of 18, 5.8% from 18 to 24, 34.3% from 25 to 44, 24.0% from 45 to 64, and 7.9% who were 65 years of age or older. The median age was 36 years. For every 100 females, there were 101.9 males. For every 100 females age 18 and over, there were 100.5 males.

The median income for a household in the CDP was $65,863, and the median income for a family was $67,173. Males had a median income of $41,957 versus $30,104 for females. The per capita income for the CDP was $25,951. None of the families and 1.7% of the population were living below the poverty line, including no under eighteens and none of those over 64.

== Notable people ==
- Walter Goodland, Governor of Wisconsin, lived on his farm in Franksville.
- Elmer A. Morse, Member of the United States House of Representatives, was born in Franksville.
