= Verona Airport (Wisconsin) =

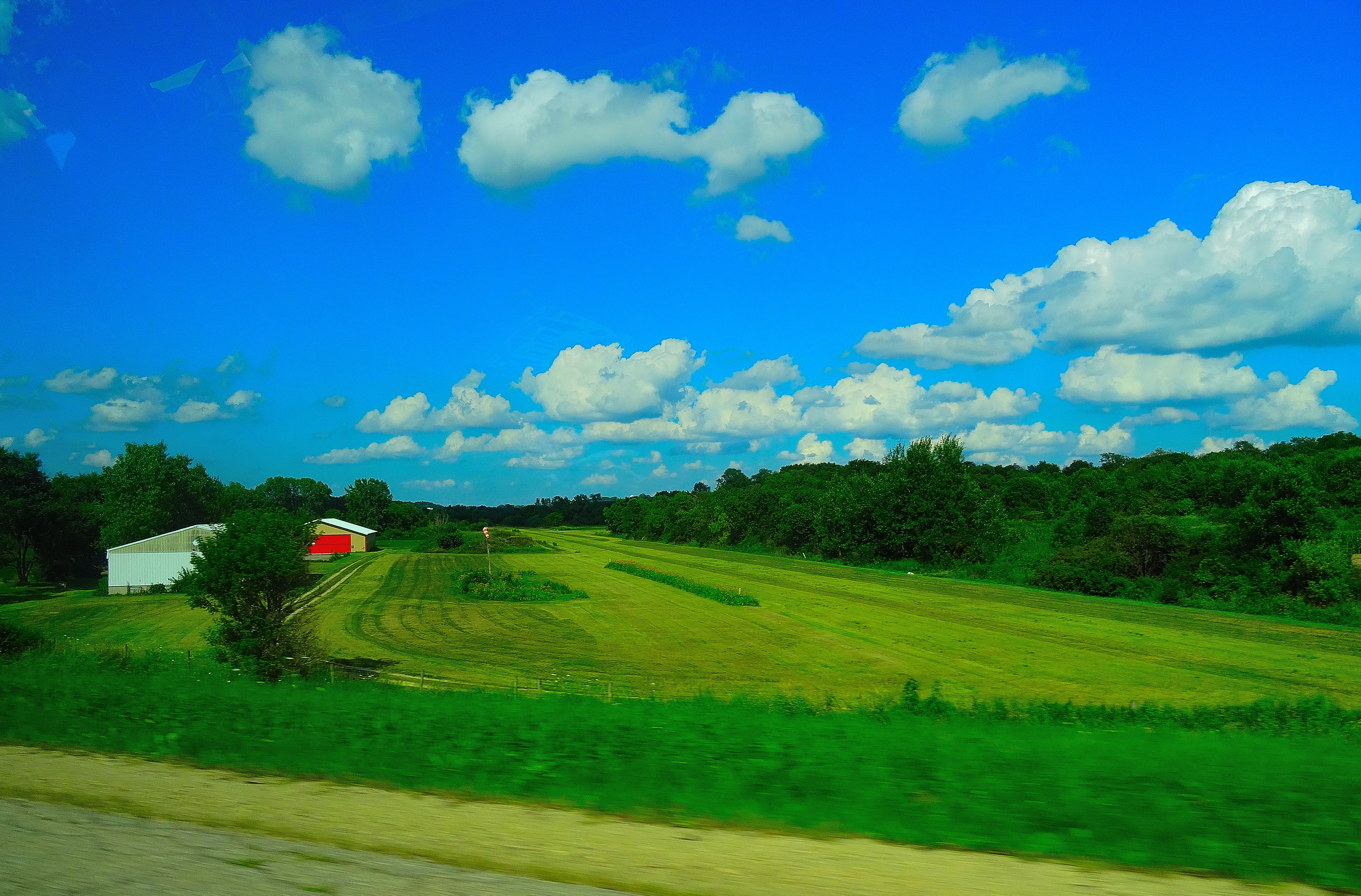
- IATA: none; ICAO: none; FAA LID: W19

Summary
- Airport type: Public use
- Owner: Robin Slotten
- Serves: Verona, Wisconsin
- Time zone: CST (UTC−06:00)
  - Summer (DST): CDT (UTC−05:00)
- Elevation AMSL: 985 ft / 300 m
- Coordinates: 42°59′23″N 089°30′33″W

Map
- Location of airport in Wisconsin W19 (the United States)

Runways
Direction	Length		Surface
Direction	ft	m	Surface
3/21	2,154	657	Turf
5/23	1,898	579	Turf

Statistics
- Aircraft operations (2019): 1,010
- Based aircraft (2024): 3
- Source: Federal Aviation Administration

Verona Airport (FAA LID: W19) was a privately owned public use airport located one nautical mile (2 km) east of the central business district of Verona, a city in Dane County, Wisconsin, United States.

== Facilities and aircraft ==
Verona Airport covered an area of 15 acres (6 ha) at an elevation of 985 feet (300 m) above mean sea level. It had two runways with turf surfaces: 3/21 is 2,154 by 45 feet (657 x 14 m) and 5/23 is 1,898 by 85 feet (579 x 26 m).

For the 12-month period ending July 17, 2019, the airport had 1,010 aircraft operations, an average of 84 per month: 99% general aviation and 1% military.

In July 2024, there were 3 aircraft based at this airport: 2 single-engine and 1 ultralight.

== See also ==
- List of airports in Wisconsin
