= Burlington Municipal Airport (Wisconsin) =

Airport in Burlington, United States of America

- IATA: none; ICAO: KBUU; FAA LID: BUU

Summary
- Airport type: Public
- Owner: City of Burlington
- Serves: Burlington, Wisconsin
- Opened: June 1963
- Time zone: CST (UTC−06:00)
  - Summer (DST): CDT (UTC−05:00)
- Elevation AMSL: 780 ft (240 m)
- Coordinates: 42°41′27″N 088°18′17″W
- Website: Burlington.gov/airport

Map
- Location of airport in Wisconsin BUU (the United States)

Runways
Direction	Length		Surface
Direction	ft	m	Surface
11/29	4,300	1,311	Asphalt
1/19	2,410	735	Turf

Statistics
- Aircraft operations (2021): 54,900
- Based aircraft (2024): 107
- Source: Federal Aviation Administration

Burlington Municipal Airport (ICAO: KBUU, FAA LID: BUU) is a public use airport located 1 mile (1.6 km) northwest of the central business district of Burlington, a city in Racine County, Wisconsin, United States.

It is included in the Federal Aviation Administration (FAA) National Plan of Integrated Airport Systems for 2025–2029, in which it is categorized as a regional general aviation facility.

Although most U.S. airports use the same three-letter location identifier for the FAA and IATA, this airport is assigned BUU by the FAA but has no designation from IATA.

The airport does not have scheduled airline service. The closest airport with scheduled airline service is Milwaukee Mitchell International Airport, about 27 miles (43 km) to the northeast.

== Facilities and aircraft ==
Burlington Municipal Airport covers an area of 240 acres (97 ha) at an elevation of 780 feet (238 m) above mean sea level. It has two runways: 11/29 is 4,300 by 75 feet (1,311 x 23 m) with an asphalt surface; 1/19 is 2,410 by 130 feet (735 x 40 m) with a turf surface.

The airport has approved GPS and VOR instrument approaches.

For the 12-month period ending May 5, 2021, the airport had 54,900 aircraft operations, an average of 150 per day: 98% general aviation, 1% military and 1% air taxi. In August 2024, there were 107 aircraft based at this airport: 97 single-engine, 5 multi-engine, 4 jet and 1 helicopter.

== See also ==
- List of airports in Wisconsin
