= List of United States tornadoes from June to August 2015 =

This is a list of all tornadoes that were confirmed by local offices of the National Weather Service in the United States from June to August 2015.

== June ==
Confirmed tornadoes by Enhanced Fujita rating
EFU	EF0	EF1	EF2	EF3	EF4	EF5	Total
0	115	58	8	3	0	0	184

=== June 1 event ===
List of confirmed tornadoes – Monday, June 1, 2015 (Note: All dates are based on the local time zone where the tornado touched down; however, all times are in Coordinated Universal Time for consistency.)
EF#	Location	County / Parish	State	Start Coord.	Time (UTC)	Path length	Max width	Damage (2015 USD)
EF0	Clermont	Lake	FL	28.55°N 81.75°W	2140	0.1 mi (0.16 km)	10 yd (9.1 m)	$0
EF0	A brief landspout tornado was observed over an open construction field.							

=== June 2 event ===
List of confirmed tornadoes – Tuesday, June 2, 2015
EF#	Location	County / Parish	State	Start Coord.	Time (UTC)	Path length	Max width	Damage (2015 USD)
EF0	WSW of Killdeer	Dunn	ND	47.3613°N 102.8192°W	1957 – 1959	0.86 mi (1.38 km)	20 yd (18 m)	$0
EF0	A brief tornado tracked across an open field, causing no damage.							

=== June 3 event ===
List of confirmed tornadoes – Wednesday, June 3, 2015
EF#	Location	County / Parish	State	Start Coord.	Time (UTC)	Path length	Max width	Damage (2015 USD)
EF0	S of Savageton	Campbell	WY	43.8295°N 105.79°W	0120	0.01 mi (0.016 km)	10 yd (9.1 m)	$0
EF0	A fire fighter and members of the public observed a brief tornado.							
EF1	W of Tipton	Osborne	KS	39.3362°N 98.5238°W	0315 – 0320	0.97 mi (1.56 km)	125 yd (114 m)	$200,000
EF1	Several outbuildings were heavily damaged or destroyed on a farmstead. Tree limbs were damaged.							
EF1	WNW of Tipton	Osborne	KS	39.3453°N 98.492°W	0317 – 0324	1.21 mi (1.95 km)	100 yd (91 m)	$250,000
EF1	Debris from a grain bin was tossed approximately 0.75 mi (1.21 km). A vacant home, large metal building, and silo were damaged.							
EF0	ESE of Tipton	Mitchell	KS	39.334°N 98.441°W	0328 – 0331	0.26 mi (0.42 km)	25 yd (23 m)	$25,000
EF0	An empty grain bin was toppled, a metal television antenna was downed, and an elm tree was topped.							

=== June 4 event ===
List of confirmed tornadoes – Thursday, June 4, 2015
EF#	Location	County / Parish	State	Start Coord.	Time (UTC)	Path length	Max width	Damage (2015 USD)
EF0	NNE of Columbia	Tyrrell	NC	35.9681°N 76.2268°W	0600 – 0601	0.13 mi (0.21 km)	100 yd (91 m)	$5,000
EF0	Several residences were damaged. A playground swing set was blown into a tree, the right wall of an outbuilding collapsed with its debris tossed eastward, and an aluminum boat was thrown into a nearby yard and canal. Softwood and hardwood tree damage was observed.							
EF0	E of Elbert	Elbert	CO	39.2012°N 104.2917°W	2238 – 2239	0.08 mi (0.13 km)	25 yd (23 m)	$0
EF0	A storm chaser observed a brief tornado.							
EF0	W of Simla	Elbert	CO	39.1779°N 104.1262°W	2312 – 2316	0.53 mi (0.85 km)	100 yd (91 m)	$0
EF0	A storm chaser observed a brief tornado.							
EF0	W of Simla	Elbert	CO	39.1635°N 104.1245°W	2320 – 2323	0.35 mi (0.56 km)	50 yd (46 m)	$0
EF0	A storm chaser observed a brief tornado.							
EF1	WSW of Simla	Elbert	CO	39.1526°N 104.1248°W	2330 – 2340	1.67 mi (2.69 km)	400 yd (370 m)	Unknown
EF1	Several trees and large tree branches were snapped, a fuel tank was thrown, a barn was damaged, and a road sign was flattened at its base.							
EF0	SW of Simla	Elbert	CO	39.1421°N 104.0651°W	2338 – 2339	0.04 mi (0.064 km)	50 yd (46 m)	$0
EF0	A storm chaser observed a brief anticyclonic tornado.							
EF1	NE of Ramah	Elbert, El Paso	CO	39.1287°N 104.128°W	2340 – 2344	0.33 mi (0.53 km)	100 yd (91 m)	$2,000
EF1	Some trees and road signs were damaged.							
EF0	ESE of Ramah	Elbert, El Paso	CO	39.1287°N 104.128°W	2354 – 2355	0.11 mi (0.18 km)	100 yd (91 m)	$0
EF0	A storm chaser observed a brief tornado.							
EF1	SSW of Simla	Elbert	CO	39.094°N 104.0524°W	2354 – 2355	0.11 mi (0.18 km)	50 yd (46 m)	Unknown
EF1	A pole barn was destroyed.							
EF0	E of Ramah	El Paso	CO	39.1213°N 104.115°W	0000 – 0018	5.05 mi (8.13 km)	200 yd (180 m)	$0
EF0	A large tornado damaged an outbuilding.							
EF0	S of Simla (1st tornado)	Elbert	CO	39.0662°N 104.0293°W	0005 – 0009	0.61 mi (0.98 km)	100 yd (91 m)	$0
EF0	A storm chaser observed a tornado over open country.							
EF0	S of Simla (2nd tornado)	Elbert	CO	39.0441°N 104.0434°W	0015 – 0019	1.01 mi (1.63 km)	100 yd (91 m)	$0
EF0	A storm chaser observed a tornado over open country.							
EF0	S of Simla (3rd tornado)	Elbert	CO	39.0584°N 104.0432°W	0017 – 0024	2 mi (3.2 km)	300 yd (270 m)	Unknown
EF0	A home, a barn, and nearby outbuildings on a farmstead sustained damage. A power pole was snapped.							
EF0	S of Simla (4th tornado)	Elbert	CO	39.0403°N 104.0208°W	0021 – 0033	2.98 mi (4.80 km)	300 yd (270 m)	$0
EF0	A storm chaser observed a tornado over open country.							
EF0	S of Simla (5th tornado)	Elbert	CO	39.0275°N 104.0219°W	0026 – 0030	1.62 mi (2.61 km)	200 yd (180 m)	$0
EF0	A storm chaser observed a tornado over open country.							
EF3	SW of Berthoud	Boulder, Larimer	CO	40.25°N 105.08°W	0030 – 0108	6.71 mi (10.80 km)	440 yd (400 m)	Unknown
EF3	A large cone tornado heavily damaged several homes, a few of which sustained total roof removal and collapse of exterior walls. Vehicles were thrown and damaged, a mobile home was completely destroyed, and small trees were snapped and debarked as well. A total of 25 homes were damaged, 3 of which were destroyed. Tornado moved along an unusual east to west path.							
EF0	S of Simla (6th tornado)	Elbert	CO	39.0268°N 104.0084°W	0032 – 0033	0.32 mi (0.51 km)	100 yd (91 m)	$0
EF0	A storm chaser observed a tornado over open country.							
EF0	S of Matheson	Elbert	CO	39.0244°N 104.0022°W	0034 – 0037	0.77 mi (1.24 km)	200 yd (180 m)	$0
EF0	A storm chaser observed a tornado over open country.							
EF0	SSE of Simla (1st tornado)	Elbert	CO	38.9841°N 103.9905°W	0036 – 0039	1.33 mi (2.14 km)	100 yd (91 m)	$0
EF0	A storm chaser observed an anticyclonic tornado over open country.							
EF0	SSE of Simla (2nd tornado)	Elbert	CO	38.9671°N 103.9798°W	0041 – 0044	1.09 mi (1.75 km)	100 yd (91 m)	$0
EF0	A storm chaser observed a tornado over open country.							
EF0	SSE of Simla (3rd tornado)	Elbert	CO	38.9342°N 103.9921°W	0110 – 0114	1.06 mi (1.71 km)	200 yd (180 m)	$0
EF0	A storm chaser observed a tornado over open country.							
EF0	W of Selden	Sheridan	KS	39.52°N 100.66°W	0253 – 0257	0.6 mi (0.97 km)	25 yd (23 m)	$0
EF0	A trained storm spotter reported a brief tornado.							

=== June 5 event ===
List of confirmed tornadoes – Friday, June 5, 2015
EF#	Location	County / Parish	State	Start Coord.	Time (UTC)	Path length	Max width	Damage (2015 USD)
EF2	N of Seibert	Kit Carson	CO	39.5293°N 102.9148°W	0924 – 0930	1.47 mi (2.37 km)	300 yd (270 m)	$29,500
EF2	A shed and two empty grain bins in a stockyard were destroyed; at least one anchor for the bins was pulled out of the ground, and debris from the bins was tossed upward of 0.5 mi (0.80 km) to the north. Several power poles were snapped.							
EF1	N of Elizabeth	Elbert	CO	39.5304°N 104.6415°W	1913 – 1917	0.59 mi (0.95 km)	50 yd (46 m)	Unknown
EF1	A roof structure was collapsed, an outbuilding and some fencing was damaged, and some trees were snapped at their base.							
EF1	Hawthorne	Mineral	NV	38.5276°N 118.5998°W	2215 – 2230	1.54 mi (2.48 km)	40 yd (37 m)	Unknown
EF1	Power lines, road signs, two vehicles, and approximately 10 to 15 homes and businesses were severely damaged. A large tree was blown over onto a mobile home.							
EF0	WNW of Cope	Washington	CO	39.69°N 103.06°W	2254 – 2301	0.1 mi (0.16 km)	100 yd (91 m)	$0
EF0	A storm chaser observed a large cone tornado over open country.							
EF0	N of Vona	Kit Carson	CO	39.43°N 102.74°W	0020 – 0035	4.53 mi (7.29 km)	150 yd (140 m)	$0
EF0	Law enforcement officers and trained storm spotters reported a large tornado over open fields.							
EF0	N of Stratton	Kit Carson	CO	39.5095°N 102.5912°W	0045 – 0053	1.98 mi (3.19 km)	150 yd (140 m)	$0
EF0	A storm chaser reported a large tornado that caused no known damage.							
EF0	E of Winona	Logan	KS	39.0677°N 101.2336°W	0224 – 0309	8.56 mi (13.78 km)	75 yd (69 m)	$0
EF0	An emergency manager reported a tornado that caused no damage.							
EF0	E of Winona	Logan	KS	39.0677°N 101.2091°W	0230 – 0231	0.1 mi (0.16 km)	10 yd (9.1 m)	$0
EF0	Storm chasers observed a brief satellite tornado to the previous event.							

=== June 6 event ===
List of confirmed tornadoes – Saturday, June 6, 2015
EF#	Location	County / Parish	State	Start Coord.	Time (UTC)	Path length	Max width	Damage (2015 USD)
EF0	SE of Mexican Hat to SE of Montezuma Creek	San Juan	UT	37.06°N 109.75°W	2340 – 2355	1.24 mi (2.00 km)	50 yd (46 m)	$0
EF0	Numerous members of the public observed a tornado that tracked across open country.							

=== June 7 event ===
List of confirmed tornadoes – Sunday, June 7, 2015
EF#	Location	County / Parish	State	Start Coord.	Time (UTC)	Path length	Max width	Damage (2015 USD)
EF0	NNW of Boxholm	Webster	IA	42.2391°N 94.1413°W	0611 – 0612	0.71 mi (1.14 km)	60 yd (55 m)	$2,000
EF0	Light tree damage occurred on a farmstead.							
EF0	SW of Fraser	Boone	IA	42.0995°N 94.0213°W	0615 – 0618	2.83 mi (4.55 km)	40 yd (37 m)	$19,000
EF0	A storage silo and a barn were damaged on a farm; light to moderate tree damage was observed as well.							
EF0	N of Fraser	Boone	IA	42.1716°N 93.9569°W	0618 – 0620	1.44 mi (2.32 km)	30 yd (27 m)	$2,000
EF0	Minor crop and tree damage was observed.							
EF1	Southern Ames	Story	IA	42.0014°N 93.6102°W	0641 – 0643	0.92 mi (1.48 km)	35 yd (32 m)	$90,000
EF1	Traffic signals, trees, and a nursery were damaged.							
EF0	NW of De Motte	Jasper	IN	41.24°N 87.22°W	2128 – 2129	0.25 mi (0.40 km)	50 yd (46 m)	$0
EF0	Trained storm spotters videoed a brief tornado.							
EF0	N of Kersey	Jasper	IN	41.24°N 87.14°W	2137 – 2141	2.76 mi (4.44 km)	50 yd (46 m)	$0
EF0	An emergency manager videoed a brief tornado.							
EF1	S of English Lake	Starke	IN	41.2438°N 86.8235°W	2231 – 2236	0.25 mi (0.40 km)	100 yd (91 m)	Unknown
EF1	Approximately four to five dozen trees were snapped or uprooted.							
EF0	N of Culver	Menard	IL	40.0169°N 89.6978°W	0122 – 0123	0.4 mi (0.64 km)	10 yd (9.1 m)	$15,000
EF0	An old barn was damaged and some trees were downed. An anemometer measured a peak wind of 77 mph (124 km/h).							
EF0	E of Monticello	Piatt, Champaign	IL	40.0259°N 88.4903°W	0203 – 0207	2.7 mi (4.3 km)	25 yd (23 m)	$92,000
EF0	A barn and a machine shed were destroyed on a farmstead. Several large trees were downed or damaged. Minor crop damage was reported.							

=== June 8 event ===
List of confirmed tornadoes – Monday, June 8, 2015
EF#	Location	County / Parish	State	Start Coord.	Time (UTC)	Path length	Max width	Damage (2015 USD)
EF0	S of Shamokin	Northumberland	PA	40.7395°N 76.5476°W	1940 – 1941	0.12 mi (0.19 km)	20 yd (18 m)	$0
EF0	Several trees were downed.							

=== June 9 event ===
List of confirmed tornadoes – Tuesday, June 9, 2015
EF#	Location	County / Parish	State	Start Coord.	Time (UTC)	Path length	Max width	Damage (2015 USD)
EF0	SW of Russellville	Berkeley	SC	33.37°N 80°W	1825 – 1830	0.21 mi (0.34 km)	25 yd (23 m)	Unknown
EF0	A waterspout was observed over Lake Moultrie.							
EF0	Scotia	Schenectady	NY	42.833°N 73.964°W	1841 – 1842	0.17 mi (0.27 km)	25 yd (23 m)	Unknown
EF0	Trees and power lines sustained damage.							

=== June 10 event ===
List of confirmed tornadoes – Wednesday, June 10, 2015
EF#	Location	County / Parish	State	Start Coord.	Time (UTC)	Path length	Max width	Damage (2015 USD)
EF0	NNW of Carson	San Juan	NM	36.5869°N 108.0729°W	1529 – 1531	0.18 mi (0.29 km)	20 yd (18 m)	$0
EF0	Broadcast media observed a brief landspout tornado that caused no damage.							
EF0	Elkton	St. Johns	FL	29.78°N 81.43°W	1834 – 1835	0.78 mi (1.26 km)	100 yd (91 m)	Unknown
EF0	Two sheds were destroyed; a metal-constructed structure and a potato field were damaged.							
EF0	NNE of Jupiter	Palm Beach	FL	26.9663°N 80.0892°W	2035 – 2038	0.21 mi (0.34 km)	10 yd (9.1 m)	$5,000
EF0	The roof to a shopping center was damaged, with trees in the parking lot uprooted.							
EF0	ESE of Farmington	Ontario	NY	42.9592°N 77.2846°W	0150 – 0155	0.32 mi (0.51 km)	50 yd (46 m)	$35,000
EF0	A garage and a barn were destroyed. A silo was lifted and tossed approximately 200 yd (180 m), causing damage to a fence and a couple dozen headstones in a graveyard. Trees were damaged.							

=== June 11 event ===
List of confirmed tornadoes – Thursday, June 11, 2015
EF#	Location	County / Parish	State	Start Coord.	Time (UTC)	Path length	Max width	Damage (2015 USD)
EF0	ESE of Westboro	Atchison	MO	40.51°N 95.28°W	2100 – 2101	0.2 mi (0.32 km)	25 yd (23 m)	$0
EF0	An off-duty National Weather Service employee observed a brief tornado over an open field.							
EF1	NE of Aledo	Mercer	IL	41.266°N 90.7081°W	2225 – 2237	5.94 mi (9.56 km)	50 yd (46 m)	$10,000
EF1	Damage was largely confined to trees and crops.							

=== June 12 event ===
List of confirmed tornadoes – Friday, June 12, 2015
EF#	Location	County / Parish	State	Start Coord.	Time (UTC)	Path length	Max width	Damage (2015 USD)
EF0	WSW of Hereford	Deaf Smith	TX	34.76°N 102.52°W	2018 – 2021	0.2 mi (0.32 km)	50 yd (46 m)	$0
EF0	Emergency management, storm chasers, and members of the public reported a tornado.							
EF0	N of Edna	Labette	KS	37.11°N 95.39°W	2025 – 2027	0.98 mi (1.58 km)	50 yd (46 m)	$0
EF0	Law enforcement reported a brief tornado over open country.							
EF0	W of Loop	Gaines	TX	32.92°N 102.4372°W	2334 – 2336	0.52 mi (0.84 km)	100 yd (91 m)	$0
EF0	A trained storm spotter reported a brief tornado.							

=== June 13 event ===
List of confirmed tornadoes – Saturday, June 13, 2015
EF#	Location	County / Parish	State	Start Coord.	Time (UTC)	Path length	Max width	Damage (2015 USD)
EF1	Southern Williamston	Martin	NC	35.8325°N 77.0697°W	2150 – 2151	0.28 mi (0.45 km)	75 yd (69 m)	$5,000
EF1	Numerous trees were snapped or uprooted, and one residence sustained minor roof damage.							
EF1	Hawk Point	Lincoln	MO	38.9572°N 91.1576°W	2345 – 2350	1.95 mi (3.14 km)	50 yd (46 m)	$0
EF1	An outbuilding was destroyed, with its debris thrown over 100 yd (91 m) into an adjacent farm field. A business was severely damaged. Several homes sustained minor damage, and several large trees were snapped or uprooted.							

=== June 14 event ===
List of confirmed tornadoes – Sunday, June 14, 2015
EF#	Location	County / Parish	State	Start Coord.	Time (UTC)	Path length	Max width	Damage (2015 USD)
EF0	SSE of North Platte	Lincoln	NE	41.04°N 100.69°W	1725 – 1729	1.04 mi (1.67 km)	25 yd (23 m)	$0
EF0	A landspout tornado tracked across an open field.							
EF0	NNE of Burdick	Morris	KS	38.6101°N 96.8087°W	0042	0.01 mi (0.016 km)	20 yd (18 m)	$0
EF0	An emergency manager reported a brief tornado.							

=== June 15 event ===
List of confirmed tornadoes – Monday, June 15, 2015
EF#	Location	County / Parish	State	Start Coord.	Time (UTC)	Path length	Max width	Damage (2015 USD)
EF0	NNW of Glenmore	Brown	WI	44.399°N 87.943°W	2009 – 2010	0.35 mi (0.56 km)	25 yd (23 m)	$100
EF0	A swing set was toppled, and a small metal shed was pushed 20 ft (6.7 yd).							
EF0	E of Medicine Bow	Carbon	WY	41.9°N 106.0444°W	2216 – 2221	1.03 mi (1.66 km)	30 yd (27 m)	$0
EF0	Members of the public observed a tornado over open country.							
EF1	SE of Symerton	Will	IL	41.3215°N 88.0269°W	0032 – 0039	4.11 mi (6.61 km)	150 yd (140 m)	$100,000
EF1	Multiple softwood and hardwood trees were snapped or uprooted. Multiple grain bins were flipped over a garage and into a field, and a few metal outbuildings were damaged. EF1 damage was sustained to two farmsteads, with metal siding and additional debris from a machine shed tossed 0.5 mi (0.80 km) downstream.							
EF0	SE of Durand	Shiawassee	MI	42.8821°N 83.9439°W	0104 – 0105	0.28 mi (0.45 km)	50 yd (46 m)	$10,000
EF0	A barn and a few trees were damaged.							

=== June 16 event ===
List of confirmed tornadoes – Tuesday, June 16, 2015
EF#	Location	County / Parish	State	Start Coord.	Time (UTC)	Path length	Max width	Damage (2015 USD)
EF3	S of Flaming Gorge	Dagget	UT	40.69°N 112.5°W	2020 – 2040	8.1 mi (13.0 km)	970 yd (890 m)	$0
EF3	An intense and large tornado caused major tree damage in Mt. Lena.							
EF1	WSW of Flaming Gorge	Dagget	UT	40.7805°N 109.3543°W	2130	1.8 mi (2.9 km)	166 yd (152 m)	$0
EF1	Soon after the Mt. Lena tornado, a less organized supercell produced a smaller tornado that skipped along an intermittent path for around 1.8 miles before dissipating. The most substantial damage was the flattening of a swath of trees 500 feet wide during the tornado’s peak.							
EF0	WSW of Flaming Gorge	Dagget	UT	40.7805°N 109.3543°W	2240	0.9 mi (1.4 km)	50 yd (46 m)	$0
EF0	A third tornado, the smallest and weakest of the group, touched down near Leona Spring after the initial two. It caused damage along an intermittent path of less than a mile, primarily downing trees in more sparsely wooded areas							
EF0	W of Douglas	Converse	WY	42.76°N 105.7743°W	2103 – 2105	1 mi (1.6 km)	35 yd (32 m)	$0
EF0	Trained storm spotters reported a tornado over open country.							

=== June 17 event ===
Events in Texas and Oklahoma were associated with Tropical Storm Bill.

List of confirmed tornadoes – Wednesday, June 17, 2015
EF#	Location	County / Parish	State	Start Coord.	Time (UTC)	Path length	Max width	Damage (2015 USD)
EF0	N of Haworth	McCurtain	OK	33.9374°N 94.6663°W	1925 – 1926	0.12 mi (0.19 km)	66 yd (60 m)	$150,000
EF0	A brief tornado damaged ten chicken houses, one of which was completely destroyed.							
EF0	ENE of Boyceville	Dunn	WI	45.0629°N 91.9894°W	2203 – 2205	0.21 mi (0.34 km)	25 yd (23 m)	$2,000
EF0	The eaves and soffits to the main building on a farm sustained minor damage; outdoor furnishing was damaged as well. Approximately a dozen trees were downed.							
EF0	NNW of Ben Bolt	Jim Wells	TX	27.6689°N 98.0918°W	2220 – 2221	0.17 mi (0.27 km)	20 yd (18 m)	$10,000
EF0	A large propane tank was blown into another property. Tree damage was observed.							
EF0	SE of Little Falls	Polk	WI	45.2592°N 92.3985°W	2230 – 2231	0.1 mi (0.16 km)	25 yd (23 m)	$0
EF0	A brief tornado damaged trees and a greenhouse covered in plastic. A few shingles were removed from two outbuildings.							
EF1	Queens area	Upshur	WV	38.8486°N 80.1606°W	2312 – 2315	1.77 mi (2.85 km)	150 yd (140 m)	$300,000
EF1	Several buildings sustained roof and property damage. Multiple trees were snapped or twisted.							

=== June 18 event ===
Events in Louisiana were associated with Tropical Storm Bill.

List of confirmed tornadoes – Thursday, June 18, 2015
EF#	Location	County / Parish	State	Start Coord.	Time (UTC)	Path length	Max width	Damage (2015 USD)
EF1	Mansfield	Desoto	LA	32.0374°N 93.7005°W	0909 – 0910	0.56 mi (0.90 km)	126 yd (115 m)	$50,000
EF1	A brief tornado snapped or uprooted several trees in town; one tree fell on a home and caused significant roof damage.							
EF1	W of Gloster	Desoto	LA	32.1935°N 93.8427°W	1138 – 1143	3.49 mi (5.62 km)	190 yd (170 m)	$75,000
EF1	A tornado snapped or uprooted several trees. One home sustained major roof damage, and several storage sheds were damaged.							
EF1	NNW of Uniontown	Stark	OH	40.9768°N 81.4045°W	2307 – 2318	8.52 mi (13.71 km)	100 yd (91 m)	$110,000
EF1	Numerous trees were snapped or uprooted. A newly constructed dairy barn sustained significant roof damage; other structures along the tornado's path sustained minor roof and siding damage.							
EF0	W of Germans Corner	Richmond	VA	38.00°N 76.88°W	0053 – 0108	5.56 mi (8.95 km)	100 yd (91 m)	$15,000
EF0	A tornado snapped or uprooted several trees. Power lines were downed.							
EF0	N of Sharps	Richmond	VA	37.85°N 76.67°W	0128 – 0138	3.06 mi (4.92 km)	50 yd (46 m)	$15,000
EF0	Several trees were snapped or uprooted, and power lines were downed.							
EF0	Mollusk	Lancaster	VA	37.74°N 76.55°W	0151 – 0206	3.82 mi (6.15 km)	50 yd (46 m)	$15,000
EF0	A tornado snapped or uprooted several trees. Power lines were downed.							

=== June 19 event ===
Event in Indiana was associated with Tropical Storm Bill.

List of confirmed tornadoes – Friday, June 19, 2015
EF#	Location	County / Parish	State	Start Coord.	Time (UTC)	Path length	Max width	Damage (2015 USD)
EF1	SE of Salem	Marion	IL	38.5691°N 88.8535°W	1730 – 1734	1.67 mi (2.69 km)	50 yd (46 m)	$0
EF1	One barn was destroyed while another was heavily damaged, with debris thrown up to a half mile away. A wooden utility pole was snapped, and large trees were uprooted.							
EF0	Farmington	Graves	KY	36.6765°N 88.519°W	1830 – 1836	1.79 mi (2.88 km)	150 yd (140 m)	$9,000
EF0	Several trees and tree limbs, as well as a swath of wheat in a field, were downed.							
EF0	ESE of Lawrenceville	Lawrence	IL	38.7131°N 87.5516°W	1926 – 1927	0.09 mi (0.14 km)	25 yd (23 m)	$25,000
EF0	A camper and trees were damaged.							
EF0	W of Norris City	White	IL	37.9801°N 88.3744°W	2013 – 2023	4.92 mi (7.92 km)	200 yd (180 m)	$55,000
EF0	Dozens of acres of corn were blown over or flattened. A tree was uprooted and several large tree limbs were snapped, a small shed was blown over, and a small section of vinyl fencing was broken.							
EF0	NNW of Tell City	Perry	IN	37.996°N 86.785°W	2040 – 2041	0.33 mi (0.53 km)	50 yd (46 m)	$0
EF0	A brief tornado caused substantial tree damage.							
EF1	ESE of Goreville	Johnson	IL	37.5354°N 88.9318°W	2057 – 2058	0.4 mi (0.64 km)	50 yd (46 m)	$5,000
EF1	A tree was uprooted; several tree limbs were downed.							
EF0	NW of Olney	Richland	IL	38.7491°N 88.0969°W	2145 – 2146	0.13 mi (0.21 km)	30 yd (27 m)	$10,000
EF0	A retail store sustained minor damage.							
EF0	NNW of Olney	Richland	IL	38.7628°N 88.0979°W	2150 – 2153	0.52 mi (0.84 km)	50 yd (46 m)	$20,000
EF0	A few trees were uprooted, and several large tree branches were downed.							
EF1	SW of West Frankfort	Franklin	IL	37.8798°N 88.9586°W	2151 – 2153	0.92 mi (1.48 km)	150 yd (140 m)	$500,000
EF1	A large two-story house lost large portions of its roof and front porch. A small storage shed and fencing were damaged, a garage had a majority of its roof ripped off, and dozens of trees and tree limbs were snapped or uprooted.							
EF1	E of Murphysboro	Jackson	IL	37.7664°N 89.3171°W	2153 – 2154	0.2 mi (0.32 km)	75 yd (69 m)	$25,000
EF1	A large portion of roofing, including the rafters, from a commercial building was blown up to 300 yd (270 m) away. One pontoon boat was flipped over while a second was lofted approximately 200 yd (180 m). Two wooden power poles were snapped, and a tree and several tree limbs were downed.							
EF0	NE of Macedonia	Hamilton	IL	38.0737°N 88.6727°W	2230 – 2231	0.49 mi (0.79 km)	50 yd (46 m)	$12,000
EF0	Several tree limbs were snapped, corn stalks were flattened, and a play set was blown over.							
EF0	ENE of Sunfield	Perry	IL	38.0842°N 89.1512°W	2301	0.1 mi (0.16 km)	30 yd (27 m)	$0
EF0	A trained storm spotter reported a brief tornado touchdown.							
EF0	N of Hammond	Carter	MT	45.31°N 104.9°W	2345 – 0000	1 mi (1.6 km)	50 yd (46 m)	$0
EF0	A trained storm spotter observed a tornado over open country.							
EF2	WNW of Hereford to WSW of Elm Springs	Meade	SD	44.417°N 103.007°W	0257 – 0327	19.69 mi (31.69 km)	100 yd (91 m)	$100,000
EF2	A large, long-tracked tornado caused substantial damage to farmsteads, power poles, trees, and outbuildings along its path. A stock trailer was lofted, a grain trailer was tossed 150 yd (140 m) from where it originated, and a grain truck was overturned. A mobile home was rolled into a grove of trees and severely damaged as well.							

=== June 20 event ===
Event in Ohio was associated with Tropical Storm Bill.

List of confirmed tornadoes – Saturday, June 20, 2015
EF#	Location	County / Parish	State	Start Coord.	Time (UTC)	Path length	Max width	Damage (2015 USD)
EF0	SSW of Bartlett	Washington	OH	39.4075°N 81.8288°W	1812 – 1813	0.12 mi (0.19 km)	77 yd (70 m)	$15,000
EF0	A tornado spawned by the remnants of Tropical Storm Bill uprooted several trees and snapped several large branches, inflicted damage to the siding and roofs of an outbuilding and a residence, and tossed an aluminum boat 140 yd (130 m), wrapping it around a tree.							
EF0	ENE of Cando	Towner	ND	48.49°N 99.05°W	2100 – 2110	0.1 mi (0.16 km)	50 yd (46 m)	$0
EF0	A trained storm spotter reported a tornado touchdown.							
EF1	S of Eddyville	Monroe, Wapello	IA	41.1184°N 92.6485°W	2309 – 2314	3.57 mi (5.75 km)	175 yd (160 m)	$91,000
EF1	Silos and outbuildings were destroyed on multiple farmsteads, power lines were bent, trees were snapped, and a house lost its roof and east wall.							
EF0	NW of Bristow	Prince William	VA	38.7318°N 77.5454°W	2327 – 2332	2.08 mi (3.35 km)	100 yd (91 m)	$50,000
EF0	A half-dozen trees were snapped above the ground. At a baseball field, a scoreboard was snapped and several dugout roofs were lifted and blown away.							
EF0	Tuscarora	Frederick	MD	39.2604°N 77.465°W	2339 – 2345	1.47 mi (2.37 km)	75 yd (69 m)	$5,000
EF0	Numerous trees were leant or downed; large tree branches were snapped.							
EF1	N of Wayland	Washington	IA	41.1662°N 91.6874°W	0001 – 0008	1.38 mi (2.22 km)	75 yd (69 m)	$60,000
EF1	Damage was largely confined to farm outbuildings and trees.							
EF0	W of Cooperstown	Griggs	ND	47.5°N 98.44°W	0002 – 0005	1.5 mi (2.4 km)	50 yd (46 m)	$0
EF0	A tornado was observed over open field.							
EF0	E of Bowling Green	Caroline	VA	38.0429°N 77.3226°W	0012 – 0015	1.3 mi (2.1 km)	50 yd (46 m)	$25,000
EF0	Several trees and power lines were damaged or downed; a large limb fell on and caused damage to a mobile home. Several large tents sustained significant damage.							
EF1	SE of Mount Pleasant	Henry	IA	40.9177°N 91.48°W	0018 – 0024	3.45 mi (5.55 km)	75 yd (69 m)	$110,000
EF1	A mobile home was rolled, injuring two occupants. Farm outbuildings and trees were damaged.							
EF1	W of Burlington	Des Moines	IA	40.8123°N 91.2844°W	0032 – 0036	2.92 mi (4.70 km)	50 yd (46 m)	$300,000
EF1	Trees, roofs, outbuildings, power poles, and vehicles were damaged.							
EF1	Fort Madison area	Lee	IA	40.6694°N 91.3607°W	0034 – 0038	4.41 mi (7.10 km)	50 yd (46 m)	$0
EF1	Several tree trunks were snapped.							

=== June 21 event ===
List of confirmed tornadoes – Sunday, June 21, 2015
EF#	Location	County / Parish	State	Start Coord.	Time (UTC)	Path length	Max width	Damage (2015 USD)
EF0	NW of Willard	Fallon	MT	46.22°N 104.4°W	2237 – 2242	1 mi (1.6 km)	50 yd (46 m)	$0
EF0	A storm chaser observed a tornado.							
EF0	SW of Lodgepole	Perkins	SD	45.758°N 102.92°W	0050 – 0058	5.11 mi (8.22 km)	50 yd (46 m)	$0
EF0	A tornado tracked across open country, causing no damage.							
EF0	S of Lodgepole	Perkins	SD	45.651°N 102.68°W	0110 – 0115	2.05 mi (3.30 km)	20 yd (18 m)	$0
EF0	A tornado tracked across open country, causing no damage.							
EF0	E of Bison	Perkins	SD	45.547°N 102.4°W	0140 – 0150	2.97 mi (4.78 km)	100 yd (91 m)	$0
EF0	A tornado tracked across open country, causing no damage.							
EF0	WSW of Meadow	Perkins	SD	45.503°N 102.3°W	0156	0.01 mi (0.016 km)	40 yd (37 m)	$0
EF0	A tornado tracked across open country, causing no damage.							
EF0	S of Meadow	Perkins	SD	45.469°N 102.23°W	0205 – 0210	2.58 mi (4.15 km)	20 yd (18 m)	$0
EF0	A tornado tracked across open country, causing no damage.							
EF0	SW of Glad Valley	Ziebach	SD	45.353°N 101.88°W	0250 – 0252	1.64 mi (2.64 km)	10 yd (9.1 m)	$0
EF0	A tornado tracked across open country, causing no damage.							

=== June 22 event ===
List of confirmed tornadoes – Monday, June 22, 2015
EF#	Location	County / Parish	State	Start Coord.	Time (UTC)	Path length	Max width	Damage (2015 USD)
EF1	Southern Mahnomen	Mahnomen	MN	47.3°N 95.97°W	0726 – 0727	0.23 mi (0.37 km)	30 yd (27 m)	Unknown
EF1	The roof was ripped off a maintenance shed, a parked semi-trailer was lifted and tipped, parked vehicles were slid, and a small wooden shed was destroyed. Flying debris impacted additional vehicles and structures.							
EF0	NE of Oshawa	Nicollet	MN	44.3125°N 94.0821°W	1150 – 1154	2.77 mi (4.46 km)	50 yd (46 m)	$0
EF0	A weak tornado blew alfalfa, caused minor damage at a few farmsteads, and knocked down several dozen trees.							
EF1	ESE of Maynard	Fayette	IA	42.7452°N 91.8142°W	1321 – 1323	1.52 mi (2.45 km)	50 yd (46 m)	$200,000
EF1	A farmhouse was destroyed, while crops, trees, and additional farm buildings were damaged.							
EF0	SSW of Steuben	Crawford	WI	43.1375°N 90.8889°W	1350 – 1352	1.32 mi (2.12 km)	35 yd (32 m)	$10,000
EF0	Trees were damaged.							
EF0	E of Plugtown	Crawford, Richland	WI	43.213°N 90.6927°W	1406 – 1408	7.39 mi (11.89 km)	60 yd (55 m)	$34,000
EF0	Numerous trees and a few homes were damaged.							
EF1	Portland	Ionia	MI	42.89°N 84.96°W	1830 – 1836	4.61 mi (7.42 km)	100 yd (91 m)	$3,200,000
EF1	More than 50 homes and businesses in the city were impacted by this high-end EF1 tornado, most of which sustained broken windows and roof damage, though some were heavily damaged. One home had its roof blown off, three churches sustained major damage, a camper was flipped, and a baseball field was severely damaged. Several vehicles were pushed and damaged, and many trees were snapped as well.							
EF3	ESE of Columbia to NW of Albia	Marion, Lucas, Monroe	IA	41.1657°N 93.1169°W	2205 – 2234	11.12 mi (17.90 km)	575 yd (526 m)	$173,000
EF3	Extreme tree and crop damage was observed along the tornado path, with some trees partially debarked. An unanchored house was completely swept from its foundation near Lovilia, and vehicles were tossed. The tornado weakened to EF1 strength and struck Albia before dissipating, damaging several homes and businesses in town.							
EF2	SSW of Albia	Monroe	IA	41.0234°N 92.8428°W	2250 – 2254	1.71 mi (2.75 km)	290 yd (270 m)	$130,000
EF2	Separate tornado from the main EF3 tornado near Albia. Several homes and businesses were heavily damaged west of town.							
EF0	E of Punta Gorda	Charlotte	FL	26.9177°N 81.9729°W	2314 – 2315	0.57 mi (0.92 km)	15 yd (14 m)	$0
EF0	Emergency managers and local broadcast media relayed pictures of a funnel cloud that appeared to reach the ground.							
EF0	ESE of Cimarron	Gray	KS	37.784°N 100.2595°W	0008 – 0020	0.55 mi (0.89 km)	50 yd (46 m)	$0
EF0	A trained storm spotter observed a landspout tornado.							
EF1	Eastern Rock Falls	Whiteside	IL	41.7909°N 89.6702°W	0014 – 0018	2.18 mi (3.51 km)	75 yd (69 m)	$0
EF1	Trees and tree trunks were snapped.							
EF2	Southern Edgington	Rock Island	IL	41.3839°N 90.7945°W	0015 – 0023	4.22 mi (6.79 km)	440 yd (400 m)	$0
EF2	Several homes in town were heavily damaged, with their roofs ripped off, and several detached garages were destroyed. Large trees were uprooted, and large tree trunks were snapped as well.							
EF1	SE of Rock Falls	Whiteside, Lee	IL	41.736°N 89.6509°W	0016 – 0021	2.51 mi (4.04 km)	50 yd (46 m)	$0
EF1	Trees trunks were snapped.							
EF1	NW of Harmon	Lee	IL	41.7436°N 89.5917°W	0028 - 0040	7.44 mi (11.97 km)	50 yd (46 m)	$0
EF1	Trees were snapped.							
EF2	W of Sublette	Lee	IL	41.6565°N 89.3213°W	0053 – 0111	7.8 mi (12.6 km)	880 yd (800 m)	$1,000,000
EF2	A high-end EF2 wedge tornado devastated the Woodhaven Lakes Campground, where a large swath of trees was flattened and many mobile homes and recreational vehicles were tossed or completely destroyed. Outbuildings were destroyed as well. Approximately 100 homes and numerous vehicles were damaged. 7 people were injured.							
EF1	Mendota	LaSalle	IL	41.5536°N 89.1334°W	0119 – 0124	1.48 mi (2.38 km)	150 yd (140 m)	$100,000
EF1	Large trees were snapped and uprooted, some of which landed on structures and inflicted damage.							
EF1	N of Ottawa	LaSalle	IL	41.4701°N 88.8719°W	0150 – 0202	6.04 mi (9.72 km)	150 yd (140 m)	$100,000
EF1	Several large trees were snapped or uprooted, one of which was downed on a house.							
EF2	E of Birch Run to S of Millington	Saginaw, Tuscola	MI	43.2542°N 83.7432°W	0203 – 0217	11.27 mi (18.14 km)	250 yd (230 m)	$600,000
EF2	One house sustained major structural damage while another sustained some damage to its roof and wall. Additional houses lost shingles, and trees were blown down.							
EF1	ESE of Deford to E of Deckerville	Tuscola, Sanilac	MI	43.5031°N 83.1308°W	0207 – 0244	22.94 mi (36.92 km)	250 yd (230 m)	$501,000
EF1	Major damage occurred to a farm, and trees and power lines were downed.							
EF1	N of Seneca to W of Morris	LaSalle, Grundy	IL	41.3996°N 88.6139°W	0217 – 0219	7.05 mi (11.35 km)	150 yd (140 m)	$50,000
EF1	Outbuildings and power lines were damaged, and large trees were snapped as well.							
EF1	NE of Mazon	Grundy	IL	41.2802°N 88.3818°W	0243 – 0246	0.8 mi (1.3 km)	100 yd (91 m)	$50,000
EF1	A portion of a house roof was ripped off, and a large tree was snapped.							
EF3	SE of Morris to SE of Braidwood	Grundy, Will	IL	41.3082°N 88.3823°W	0245 – 0312	16.26 mi (26.17 km)	1,320 yd (1,210 m)	$25,250,000
EF3	Numerous anchor-bolted frame homes were damaged or destroyed, including a few that were leveled or swept away. Two metal high-tension truss towers were collapsed as well. In Braidwood, the tornado caused significant damage to trees, power poles, and a motel.							
EF1	Bourbonnais	Kankakee	IL	41.1785°N 87.8896°W	0308 – 0312	2.24 mi (3.60 km)	300 yd (270 m)	$0
EF1	Damage was largely confined to snapped trees and tree tops, although a few were uprooted.							
EF0	SW of Emmett	St. Clair	MI	42.9567°N 82.8224°W	0355 – 0356	0.63 mi (1.01 km)	50 yd (46 m)	$10,000
EF0	Trees were downed, the roof to a shed was damaged, and a deck was blown over.							
EF0	S of Herscher	Kankakee	IL	41.0155°N 88.0138°W	0446 – 0448	1.02 mi (1.64 km)	50 yd (46 m)	$0
EF0	A trained storm spotter and law enforcement officer reported a brief tornado.							

=== June 23 event ===
List of confirmed tornadoes – Tuesday, June 23, 2015
EF#	Location	County / Parish	State	Start Coord.	Time (UTC)	Path length	Max width	Damage (2015 USD)
EF1	N of Manchester	Washtenaw	MI	42.1883°N 84.0323°W	0631 – 0638	4.33 mi (6.97 km)	100 yd (91 m)	$300,000
EF1	A house's garage was swept off its foundation, trees were damaged, and homes sustained roof and siding damage.							
EF0	SW of Lancaster	Fairfield	OH	39.6984°N 82.6127°W	1739 – 1740	0.47 mi (0.76 km)	25 yd (23 m)	$8,000
EF0	Some wheat was flattened in a field and minor tree damage occurred.							
EF0	Wrentham	Norfolk	MA	42.065°N 71.3335°W	2135 – 2137	0.48 mi (0.77 km)	200 yd (180 m)	$20,000
EF0	A large tree was uprooted, and several tree tops and limbs were downed.							
EF0	SW of Hubbardston	Worcester	MA	39.6984°N 82.6127°W	1739 – 1740	0.47 mi (0.76 km)	25 yd (23 m)	$8,000
EF0	Minor tree damage occurred.							
EF0	Westminster	Worcester	MA	42.5119°N 71.9041°W	2324 – 2326	0.52 mi (0.84 km)	75 yd (69 m)	$25,000
EF0	Approximately a dozen trees were damaged and several tree tops were sheared off.							

=== June 24 event ===
List of confirmed tornadoes – Wednesday, June 24, 2015
EF#	Location	County / Parish	State	Start Coord.	Time (UTC)	Path length	Max width	Damage (2015 USD)
EF1	E of Denver	Denver	CO	39.7254°N 104.9039°W	2248 – 2310	2.8 mi (4.5 km)	50 yd (46 m)	Unknown
EF1	Although a majority of the damage was confined to trees, some homes and a former apartment building sustained roof damage.							
EF0	SE of Emerson	Dunn	ND	47.11°N 102.56°W	0037 – 0038	0.08 mi (0.13 km)	15 yd (14 m)	$0
EF0	Law enforcement reported a brief tornado that caused no damage.							

=== June 25 event ===
List of confirmed tornadoes – Thursday, June 25, 2015
EF#	Location	County / Parish	State	Start Coord.	Time (UTC)	Path length	Max width	Damage (2015 USD)
EF0	WSW of Hawk Springs	Goshen	WY	41.7069°N 104.5288°W	2245 – 2248	1.9 mi (3.1 km)	50 yd (46 m)	$0
EF0	A landspout tornado tracked across open country, causing no damage.							
EF0	W of Jetmore	Hodgeman	KS	38.0671°N 100.0545°W	2256 – 2304	1.03 mi (1.66 km)	50 yd (46 m)	$0
EF0	Numerous members of the public observed a waterspout that moved ashore; no damage was reported.							
EF0	N of Bayard	Morrill	NE	41.789°N 103.32°W	2323 – 2330	1.86 mi (2.99 km)	50 yd (46 m)	$0
EF0	A trained storm spotter observed a landspout tornado that caused no damage.							

=== June 26 event ===
List of confirmed tornadoes – Friday, June 26, 2015
EF#	Location	County / Parish	State	Start Coord.	Time (UTC)	Path length	Max width	Damage (2015 USD)
EF0	E of Ripley	Jackson	WV	38.8316°N 81.6773°W	2328 – 2331	1.35 mi (2.17 km)	200 yd (180 m)	$25,000
EF0	The roof to a small cattle shelter was lifted and tossed approximately 125 yd (114 m) northwest. The cross atop the steeple of a church was bent; some fascia was removed from the building as well. Trees and tree limbs were downed.							

=== June 27 event ===
List of confirmed tornadoes – Saturday, June 27, 2015
EF#	Location	County / Parish	State	Start Coord.	Time (UTC)	Path length	Max width	Damage (2015 USD)
EF0	WNW of Atlee	Hanover	VA	37.6594°N 77.4379°W	1935 – 1943	3.59 mi (5.78 km)	25 yd (23 m)	$2,000
EF0	The tops of trees sustained minor damage.							
EF1	Morgantown	Charles	MD	38.353°N 76.935°W	2028 – 2036	2.02 mi (3.25 km)	100 yd (91 m)	$500,000
EF1	Dozens of large trees were snapped and uprooted along the path, some of which fell on homes. Many homes had siding damage and removed shingles, and at least one home had roofing material removed along the edge of the roof. Outbuildings and carports were also destroyed.							
EF1	Swan Point to Oakville	Charles, St. Mary's	MD	38.294°N 76.907°W	2032 – 2107	16.11 mi (25.93 km)	800 yd (730 m)	$13,000
EF1	Substantial tree damage occurred along the path, and some homes were damaged by falling trees. Several barns and outbuildings were flattened and minor siding and shingle damage occurred to some homes. A gazebo was blown into the Wicomico River, and bleachers and sports fields were damaged at a high school.							
EF0	E of Osnabrock	Cavalier	ND	48.67°N 98.11°W	2055 – 2056	0.25 mi (0.40 km)	20 yd (18 m)	$0
EF0	A trained storm spotter observed a tornado over open fields.							
EF1	Milton	Cavalier	ND	48.63°N 98.07°W	2102 – 2104	0.91 mi (1.46 km)	120 yd (110 m)	Unknown
EF1	Eight empty grain cars were blown over to the southwest.							
EF0	Fernway	Butler	PA	40.698°N 80.08°W	2106 – 2108	1.81 mi (2.91 km)	50 yd (46 m)	$5,000
EF0	A few trees were snapped or uprooted.							
EF1	SE of Milton	Cavalier	ND	48.58°N 97.97°W	2109 – 2116	3 mi (4.8 km)	150 yd (140 m)	Unknown
EF1	Numerous trees and a power pole were snapped. A road sign was twisted.							
EF0	SSW of Edinburg	Walsh	ND	48.43°N 97.90°W	2117 - 2128	3 mi (4.8 km)	75 yd (69 m)	$0
EF0	Trained storm spotters observed a tornado over open fields.							
EF0	ESE of Adams	Walsh	ND	48.4°N 97.99°W	2124 – 2125	0.83 mi (1.34 km)	50 yd (46 m)	$0
EF0	A few large tree branches were downed.							
EF0	NE of Fordville	Walsh	ND	48.24°N 97.76°W	2128 – 2130	0.83 mi (1.34 km)	50 yd (46 m)	$0
EF0	Law enforcement observed a tornado over open fields.							
EF0	SE of Sandy Creek	Brunswick	NC	34.2759°N 78.1189°W	2130 – 2131	0.03 mi (0.048 km)	25 yd (23 m)	$2,500
EF0	A brief tornado inflicted roof damage, moved a farm tractor a few feet, and caused a large tree to fall and break a fence.							
EF1	NE of McVille to NNE of Aneta	Nelson	ND	47.84°N 98.07°W	2136 – 2150	4.8 mi (7.7 km)	75 yd (69 m)	Unknown
EF1	A tornado downed an old barn and blew out two steel grain bins at one farmstead and snapped several trees at two others.							
EF1	Cumnock	Lee	NC	35.5541°N 79.2455°W	2146 – 2149	0.49 mi (0.79 km)	100 yd (91 m)	$25,000
EF1	Numerous trees were snapped or downed. A home sustained damage to its roof, shingles, siding, and garden; a van had its windows blown out and a trampoline was mangled and tossed 130 yd (120 m).							
EF1	W of Inkster	Grand Forks	ND	48.18°N 97.69°W	2155 – 2210	5.29 mi (8.51 km)	150 yd (140 m)	$0
EF1	A few trees were snapped other large tree branches were broken in shelterbelts along the path.							
EF0	W of Northwood	Grand Forks	ND	47.72°N 97.82°W	2213 – 2215	1 mi (1.6 km)	50 yd (46 m)	$0
EF0	A trained storm spotter observed a tornado over open country.							
EF0	E of Sharon	Steele	ND	47.6°N 97.73°W	2218	0.1 mi (0.16 km)	25 yd (23 m)	$0
EF0	Members of the public observed a brief tornado in an open field.							
EF0	NNW of Fingal	Barnes	ND	46.79°N 97.81°W	2224	0.1 mi (0.16 km)	25 yd (23 m)	$0
EF0	Law enforcement observed a brief tornado in an open field.							
EF0	W of Arvilla	Grand Forks	ND	47.92°N 97.54°W	2238 – 2242	2 mi (3.2 km)	50 yd (46 m)	$0
EF0	Large tree branches were broken in a shelterbelts.							
EF1	NE of Hope	Steele	ND	47.4°N 97.61°W	2248 – 2258	3.23 mi (5.20 km)	800 yd (730 m)	Unknown
EF1	Numerous trees were damaged in shelterbelts, and a few power poles were snapped.							
EF2	E of Northwood	Grand Forks	ND	47.72°N 97.38°W	2302 – 2315	3 mi (4.8 km)	400 yd (370 m)	$0
EF2	Numerous trees were snapped, with some partially debarked.							
EF1	WNW of Galesburg	Steele	ND	47.3°N 97.51°W	2313 – 2321	3.45 mi (5.55 km)	300 yd (270 m)	Unknown
EF1	Numerous trees in shelterbelts and two power poles were snapped, and bean fields were scoured.							
EF1	NE of Raynham	Robeson	NC	34.5834°N 79.1635°W	0023 – 0024	0.67 mi (1.08 km)	175 yd (160 m)	$40,000
EF1	Numerous trees were snapped. The metal roofs were torn off several barns, an empty fertilizer silo was overturned, and a piece of farm equipment was destroyed.							
EF1	SE of Lumberton	Robeson	NC	34.5908°N 78.9222°W	0045 – 0046	0.05 mi (0.080 km)	100 yd (91 m)	$20,000
EF1	A 100-year-old tree was uprooted, falling and puncturing the roof of a nearby home. Four other trees were uprooted.							
EF0	E of Downer	Clay	MN	46.75°N 96.36°W	0105	0.1 mi (0.16 km)	25 yd (23 m)	$0
EF0	A trained storm spotter observed a brief tornado.							
EF0	NW of Huron	Beadle	SD	44.41°N 98.47°W	0114 – 0115	0.33 mi (0.53 km)	50 yd (46 m)	$0
EF0	An emergency manager reported a brief tornado.							
EF1	ENE of Barney	Richland	ND	46.27°N 96.98°W	0122 - 0126	2.03 mi (3.27 km)	75 yd (69 m)	Unknown
EF1	Large trees and tree branches were broken, a wooden play area was flipped and tossed a few yards, and septic tank pipes were jumbled.							
EF1	SE of Great Bend	Richland	ND	46.13°N 96.77°W	0144 - 0145	0.84 mi (1.35 km)	100 yd (91 m)	Unknown
EF1	Numerous trees were snapped or downed. A steel grain bin was blown off its foundation on one farmstead.							
EF0	W of Fairmount	Richland	ND	46.05°N 96.75°W	0159 – 0203	2.36 mi (3.80 km)	300 yd (270 m)	$0
EF0	Large tree branches were downed in shelterbelts.							

=== June 28 event ===
List of confirmed tornadoes – Sunday, June 28, 2015
EF#	Location	County / Parish	State	Start Coord.	Time (UTC)	Path length	Max width	Damage (2015 USD)
EF0	SE of Milton	Van Buren	IA	40.6649°N 92.161°W	2149 – 2150	0.1 mi (0.16 km)	25 yd (23 m)	$0
EF0	Law enforcement reported a brief tornado.							
EF0	SW of Fulton	Callaway	MO	38.7531°N 92.059°W	2246 – 2247	0.11 mi (0.18 km)	10 yd (9.1 m)	$0
EF0	A trained storm spotter observed a tornado over a field.							
EF1	WNW of Eolia	Pike	MO	39.2543°N 91.0863°W	2323 – 2329	2.48 mi (3.99 km)	50 yd (46 m)	$0
EF1	Numerous trees and tree limbs were snapped.							
EF0	W of Eolia	Pike	MO	39.2332°N 91.0318°W	2334 – 2335	0.65 mi (1.05 km)	40 yd (37 m)	$0
EF0	Tree branches were snapped.							
EF2	NW of St. Peters	St. Charles	MO	38.8389°N 90.6419°W	0104 – 0109	2.26 mi (3.64 km)	400 yd (370 m)	$0
EF2	Numerous trees and power poles were snapped, a shed and an outbuilding were destroyed, and a convergent pattern was noted in a corn field. One frame home had most of its roof torn off, while two other frame homes and a manufactured home sustained minor damage.							

=== June 29 event ===
List of confirmed tornadoes – Monday, June 29, 2015
EF#	Location	County / Parish	State	Start Coord.	Time (UTC)	Path length	Max width	Damage (2015 USD)
EF0	N of Ingalls	Gray	KS	37.9024°N 100.45°W	2300 – 2305	0.16 mi (0.26 km)	50 yd (46 m)	$0
EF0	An emergency manager reported a brief landspout tornado.							

=== June 30 event ===
List of confirmed tornadoes – Tuesday, June 30, 2015
EF#	Location	County / Parish	State	Start Coord.	Time (UTC)	Path length	Max width	Damage (2015 USD)
EF1	S of Morgantown	Chester	PA	40.1163°N 75.8866°W	1811 – 1813	0.68 mi (1.09 km)	100 yd (91 m)	$250,000
EF1	Roof panels were torn from one house. A mobile home was unseated from its moorings. A barn had its roof torn off and wall damaged, while a few farmsteads sustained damage. Numerous trees and power lines were snapped or downed.							
EF1	SE of Crane to SW of Trotters	Richland (MT), McKenzie (ND), Golden Valley (ND)	MT, ND	47.4764°N 104.1129°W	2259 – 2343	17.47 mi (28.12 km)	50 yd (46 m)	$50,000
EF1	Two mobile homes were tossed from their foundations and overturned, with one having its entire frame bent. Power lines were snapped, and trees were downed.							
EF1	S of Riverside	Northumberland	PA	40.9242°N 76.6444°W	0003 – 0004	1.1 mi (1.8 km)	100 yd (91 m)	$50,000
EF1	A shed was destroyed, a home, a small barn, and a car were damaged, and multiple trees were downed.							
EF1	S of Bowman to N of Ludlow	Bowman, Harding	ND, SD	45.98°N 103.42°W	0124 – 0134	3.85 mi (6.20 km)	80 yd (73 m)	$240,000
EF1	A farmhouse had shingles torn from its roof, fencing and outbuildings were damaged, trees were uprooted, and 21 wooden power poles were damaged.							

== July ==
Confirmed tornadoes by Enhanced Fujita rating
EFU	EF0	EF1	EF2	EF3	EF4	EF5	Total
0	71	39	4	1	0	0	115

=== July 1 event ===
List of confirmed tornadoes – Wednesday, July 1, 2015
EF#	Location	County / Parish	State	Start Coord.	Time (UTC)	Path length	Max width	Damage (2015 USD)
EF0	WSW of Nancy	Pulaski	KY	37.064°N 84.8021°W	2000 – 2001	0.3 mi (0.48 km)	100 yd (91 m)	Unknown
EF0	An old barn collapsed, shingles were blown off a house's roof, and a few tombstones were overturned in a cemetery.							
EF1	N of Lee's Summit	Jackson	MO	38.941°N 94.385°W	2351 – 2355	0.93 mi (1.50 km)	100 yd (91 m)	$0
EF1	Roofing tiles were blown off a strip mall while nearby shop and car windows were broken. A fireworks tent was blown down.							
EF0	SE of Lee's Summit	Jackson	MO	38.897°N 94.341°W	0004 – 0005	0.18 mi (0.29 km)	50 yd (46 m)	$0
EF0	Minor tree damage was observed.							
EF0	SW of Pleasant Hill	Cass	MO	38.776°N 94.307°W	0101 – 0107	1.41 mi (2.27 km)	100 yd (91 m)	$0
EF0	A tornado produced minor tree damage.							
EF1	NW of Warsaw	Benton	MO	38.2844°N 93.4278°W	0256 – 0303	3.25 mi (5.23 km)	600 yd (550 m)	$500,000
EF1	A large tornado uprooted numerous trees, damaged a metal building, flipped a boat dock and heavily damaged seven boats, and downed a fireworks tent. A few trees fell on recreational vehicles.							
EF0	NE of Dixon	Maries	MO	38.0666°N 92.0011°W	0355 – 0357	0.2 mi (0.32 km)	50 yd (46 m)	$0
EF0	One tree was uprooted and several limbs were downed.							

=== July 2 event ===
List of confirmed tornadoes – Thursday, July 2, 2015
EF#	Location	County / Parish	State	Start Coord.	Time (UTC)	Path length	Max width	Damage (2015 USD)
EF0	SE of Old Hickory	Davidson	TN	36.2348°N 86.6175°W	2215 – 2218	0.87 mi (1.40 km)	50 yd (46 m)	$20,000
EF0	Several trees were downed, and a few homes sustained roof damage just north of The Hermitage.							
EF0	Southern Green Hill	Wilson	TN	36.2263°N 86.5796°W	2222 – 2223	0.32 mi (0.51 km)	50 yd (46 m)	$25,000
EF0	A few homes sustained minor roof and exterior damage, and a few trees were downed.							
EF0	WNW of Lebanon	Wilson	TN	36.223°N 86.461°W	2344 – 2353	2.65 mi (4.26 km)	50 yd (46 m)	$10,000
EF0	A home and a warehouse building sustained minor damage, and several trees were downed.							
EF0	SSW of Lebanon	Wilson	TN	36.1673°N 86.3412°W	0020 – 0031	2.53 mi (4.07 km)	100 yd (91 m)	$10,000
EF0	Several trees and tree limbs were downed. A fence and trash cans were blown from a gas station into a road.							
EF0	Southeastern Lebanon	Wilson	TN	36.1925°N 86.2734°W	0036 – 0042	1.08 mi (1.74 km)	100 yd (91 m)	$20,000
EF0	One outdoor shed was destroyed while a few others were damaged. An information booth was destroyed, a power pole was snapped, and power lines were downed. Several trees were downed, one of which crushed a pickup truck.							

=== July 5 event ===
List of confirmed tornadoes – Sunday, July 5, 2015
EF#	Location	County / Parish	State	Start Coord.	Time (UTC)	Path length	Max width	Damage (2015 USD)
EF0	SSE of Sebree	Webster	KY	37.5465°N 87.5021°W	2026 – 2029	1 mi (1.6 km)	30 yd (27 m)	$0
EF0	A trained storm spotter observed a brief landspout tornado.							

=== July 6 event ===
List of confirmed tornadoes – Monday, July 6, 2015
EF#	Location	County / Parish	State	Start Coord.	Time (UTC)	Path length	Max width	Damage (2015 USD)
EF0	S of Dolton	Turner	SD	43.4498°N 97.3956°W	0519 – 0524	0.45 mi (0.72 km)	40 yd (37 m)	$0
EF0	An unknown amount of crop damage occurred.							
EF1	W of Marion	Waupaca	WI	44.6627°N 88.9492°W	2138 – 2140	0.75 mi (1.21 km)	75 yd (69 m)	$100,000
EF1	A barn and adjacent garage were heavily damaged. One house had its roof damaged while another had its windows broken. At least two dozen trees were snapped or uprooted.							
EF0	E of Pella	Shawano	WI	44.7278°N 88.7579°W	2203 – 2204	0.08 mi (0.13 km)	25 yd (23 m)	$10,000
EF0	A portion of the roof was ripped off a barn, and wooden pallets were tossed into a nearby field.							
EF0	S of Liberty	Clay	MO	39.2358°N 94.4362°W	2204 – 2207	1.23 mi (1.98 km)	40 yd (37 m)	$0
EF0	Numerous trees were damaged.							
EF1	W of Eudora to SW of De Soto	Douglas, Johnson	KS	38.9361°N 95.122°W	2212 – 2223	8.3 mi (13.4 km)	250 yd (230 m)	$0
EF1	EF1 tree damage was observed.							
EF0	NW of Olathe	Johnson	KS	38.9241°N 94.8649°W	2230 – 2231	0.23 mi (0.37 km)	30 yd (27 m)	$0
EF0	A weak tornado caused tree damage.							
EF0	ENE of Gillett	Oconto	WI	44.8949°N 88.2802°W	2256 – 2303	2.25 mi (3.62 km)	50 yd (46 m)	$5,000
EF0	A house sustained minor damage, and at least 20 trees were snapped or uprooted.							

=== July 7 event ===
List of confirmed tornadoes – Tuesday, July 7, 2015
EF#	Location	County / Parish	State	Start Coord.	Time (UTC)	Path length	Max width	Damage (2015 USD)
EF0	NNW of Flemingsburg	Fleming	KY	38.4619°N 83.7588°W	2129 – 2130	0.25 mi (0.40 km)	50 yd (46 m)	Unknown
EF0	A small farm building was destroyed while another had its windows blown out. A few trees were damaged or uprooted as well.							
EF0	WNW of Red Desert	Sweetwater	WY	41.6651°N 108.1564°W	2130	0.05 mi (0.080 km)	10 yd (9.1 m)	$0
EF0	Members of the public witnessed a tornado over open country.							
EF1	SE of McCurtain	Le Flore	OK	35.1086°N 94.9121°W	2242 – 2243	0.3 mi (0.48 km)	75 yd (69 m)	$15,000
EF1	A barn was damaged, large tree limbs were snapped, and trees were uprooted.							
EF0	ENE of Edgewood	Santa Fe	NM	35.0736°N 106.1783°W	2315 – 2318	0.25 mi (0.40 km)	25 yd (23 m)	$100,000
EF0	A large metal hay barn was tossed 0.25 mi (0.40 km) into a nearby home.							

=== July 8 event ===
List of confirmed tornadoes – Wednesday, July 8, 2015
EF#	Location	County / Parish	State	Start Coord.	Time (UTC)	Path length	Max width	Damage (2015 USD)
EF0	ENE of Caledonia	Washington	MO	37.7826°N 90.7522°W	2343 – 2345	0.18 mi (0.29 km)	100 yd (91 m)	$0
EF0	Trained storm spotters documented a brief tornado that lofted tree debris.							
EF0	SE of Festus	Jefferson	MO	38.1539°N 90.3114°W	0006 – 0007	0.15 mi (0.24 km)	50 yd (46 m)	$0
EF0	Only tree damage was observed.							
EF1	NNW of Commerce	Scott, Alexander	MO, IL	37.1717°N 89.5248°W	0135 – 0147	6.26 mi (10.07 km)	125 yd (114 m)	$76,000
EF1	Several outbuildings, including a large shed, were destroyed. Three camper trailers were overturned, one of which sustained major damage. A few homes sustained shingle and siding damage. Numerous trees were snapped or uprooted.							
EF0	Lake Tahoe	El Dorado	CA	38.9728°N 120.071°W	0405 – 0420	2.68 mi (4.31 km)	10 yd (9.1 m)	$0
EF0	Members of the public witnessed a waterspout.							

=== July 9 event ===
List of confirmed tornadoes – Thursday, July 9, 2015
EF#	Location	County / Parish	State	Start Coord.	Time (UTC)	Path length	Max width	Damage (2015 USD)
EF0	N of Ava	Douglas	MO	36.9989°N 92.6717°W	2000 – 2003	1.38 mi (2.22 km)	100 yd (91 m)	$0
EF0	Numerous trees were uprooted.							
EF0	NE of Ava	Douglas	MO	37.0133°N 92.6288°W	2005 – 2008	2.36 mi (3.80 km)	100 yd (91 m)	$0
EF0	Numerous trees were downed or uprooted. Power lines were downed.							
EF1	SSE of Mesa	Mesa	CO	39.0751°N 108.1062°W	2132 – 2137	0.11 mi (0.18 km)	50 yd (46 m)	$0
EF1	Many aspen trees were snapped or uprooted.							
EF1	NE of Montoursville	Lycoming	PA	41.2757°N 76.8756°W	2040 – 2042	0.94 mi (1.51 km)	225 yd (206 m)	$100,000
EF1	Several outbuildings were damaged, and numerous trees were snapped or uprooted.							
EF0	Selinsgrove	Snyder	PA	40.7887°N 76.8679°W	2055 – 2057	0.96 mi (1.54 km)	150 yd (140 m)	$20,000
EF0	Several trees were snapped or uprooted. Crop damage was observed.							
EF1	NE of Tahlequah	Cherokee	OK	35.9860°N 94.8854°W	2208 – 2216	5.5 mi (8.9 km)	220 yd (200 m)	$0
EF1	Numerous trees were uprooted.							
EF1	NNE of Proctor	Adair	OK	36.0233°N 94.765°W	2218 – 2223	3.7 mi (6.0 km)	500 yd (460 m)	$0
EF1	Numerous trees were snapped or uprooted.							
EF1	Tilden Township	Berks	PA	40.5488°N 76.0434°W	2240 – 2241	0.74 mi (1.19 km)	75 yd (69 m)	$750,000
EF1	The entire roof was ripped off a high school, rendering the structure a total loss. Hardwood trees were snapped.							
EF1	N of Gentry	Benton	AR	36.2711°N 94.5066°W	2255 – 2301	3.6 mi (5.8 km)	300 yd (270 m)	$150,000
EF1	A double-wide modular home and metal-framed outbuilding were destroyed, seven permanent homes were damaged, numerous trees were snapped or uprooted, and power poles were downed.							
EF0	Minquadale	New Castle	DE	39.709°N 75.5497°W	2350 – 2351	0.52 mi (0.84 km)	75 yd (69 m)	$200,000
EF0	Eight units of a mobile home village were damaged. A downed transformer fell through a bedroom. Shingles and gutters were ripped from other homes. A telephone pole was sheered off, and several tree were downed.							

=== July 10 event ===
List of confirmed tornadoes – Friday, July 10, 2015
EF#	Location	County / Parish	State	Start Coord.	Time (UTC)	Path length	Max width	Damage (2015 USD)
EF0	NNE of Flaherty	Meade, Hardin	KY	37.8784°N 86.0352°W	1435 – 1441	5.75 mi (9.25 km)	100 yd (91 m)	$25,000
EF0	Significant tree damage was observed, including large trees that were snapped or uprooted. A few buildings sustained shingle damage.							
EF0	Belmont	Bullitt	KY	37.8942°N 85.7279°W	1453 – 1454	0.9 mi (1.4 km)	150 yd (140 m)	$75,000
EF0	At least three homes were damaged; two sustained damage from fallen trees while the other sustained minor roof damage. Trees also fell on two outbuildings.							

=== July 11 event ===
List of confirmed tornadoes – Saturday, July 11, 2015
EF#	Location	County / Parish	State	Start Coord.	Time (UTC)	Path length	Max width	Damage (2015 USD)
EF0	NE of Terreton to SSW of Hamer	Jefferson	ID	43.8607°N 112.3874°W	2040 – 2125	7.44 mi (11.97 km)	10 yd (9.1 m)	$0
EF0	A video and photographs of a tornado between Mud Lake and Sage Junction were received on social media.							
EF0	Forsyth	Macon	IL	39.9285°N 88.9514°W	0225 – 0226	0.09 mi (0.14 km)	50 yd (46 m)	$15,000
EF0	A brief tornado touched down just south of Forsyth. The tornado snapped off several tree tops, damaged a shed, destroyed a dog kernel, blew in a garage door, and did minor roof damage to two homes before dissipating.							
EF0	SE of Baker	Benson	ND	39.9285°N 88.9514°W	0324	0.06 mi (0.097 km)	25 yd (23 m)	$0
EF0	A tornado briefly touched down and a dust swirl was observed.							

=== July 12 event ===
List of confirmed tornadoes – Sunday, July 12, 2015
EF#	Location	County / Parish	State	Start Coord.	Time (UTC)	Path length	Max width	Damage (2015 USD)
EF0	SW of Trafalgar	Johnson	IN	39.3959°N 86.2065°W	0738 – 0745	6.44 mi (10.36 km)	125 yd (114 m)	$80,000
EF0	A few trees and corn stalks were downed; several homes sustained damage due to fallen trees.							
EF0	NE of Portland	Traill	ND	47.63°N 97.27°W	2107	0.05 mi (0.080 km)	25 yd (23 m)	$0
EF0	Law enforcement observed a brief tornado over an open field.							
EF0	NE of Grand Forks	Grand Forks	ND	47.98°N 97.16°W	2135	0.05 mi (0.080 km)	10 yd (9.1 m)	$0
EF0	A brief tornado touchdown was observed over an open field.							
EF0	N of Elizabeth	Otter Tail	MN	46.4°N 96.16°W	2159 – 2212	2.98 mi (4.80 km)	100 yd (91 m)	$0
EF0	Numerous tree branches were snapped.							
EF0	W of Doran	Wilkin	MN	46.18°N 96.5°W	2207 – 2208	0.1 mi (0.16 km)	25 yd (23 m)	$0
EF0	Trained storm spotters observed a brief tornado in a bean field.							
EF0	NE of Campbell	Wilkin	MN	46.12°N 96.38°W	2214	0.05 mi (0.080 km)	10 yd (9.1 m)	$0
EF0	Trained storm spotters observed a brief tornado in an open field.							
EF0	NNW of Wendell	Grant	MN	46.1°N 96.14°W	2231 – 2234	1.92 mi (3.09 km)	100 yd (91 m)	$0
EF0	A tornado tracking along an intermittent path was spotted multiple times.							
EF0	WNW of Dalton	Otter Tail	MN	46.2°N 96.01°W	2244 – 2246	0.5 mi (0.80 km)	150 yd (140 m)	$0
EF0	Law enforcement observed a brief tornado.							
EF1	WNW of Henning	Otter Tail	MN	46.34°N 95.53°W	2248 – 2255	2.01 mi (3.23 km)	150 yd (140 m)	$0
EF1	Numerous trees and limbs were snapped.							
EF1	SW of Vining	Otter Tail	MN	46.23°N 95.58°W	2300	0.05 mi (0.080 km)	30 yd (27 m)	$0
EF1	A few trees in a shelterbelt were snapped.							
EF1	SSW of Elbow Lake	Grant	MN	45.98°N 96.02°W	2321 – 2325	1.96 mi (3.15 km)	100 yd (91 m)	$0
EF1	Several trees in a shelterbelt were snapped or uprooted.							
EF2	S of Wadena to W of Staples	Wadena, Todd	MN	46.38°N 95.07°W	2338 – 2358	12.09 mi (19.46 km)	400 yd (370 m)	Unknown
EF2	A strong tornado demolished a silo, destroyed a storage barn and additional outbuildings, downed four sets of high voltage power poles, and ripped through sections of center pivot irrigation systems. Another barn was collapsed, with roofing material tossed 0.5 mi (0.80 km) downstream. Dozens of trees were snapped or uprooted.							

=== July 13 event ===
List of confirmed tornadoes – Monday, July 13, 2015
EF#	Location	County / Parish	State	Start Coord.	Time (UTC)	Path length	Max width	Damage (2015 USD)
EF1	SE of Greensburg	Green	KY	37.2091°N 85.4418°W	2200 – 2222	1.1 mi (1.8 km)	50 yd (46 m)	$200,000
EF1	Two barns and a mobile home were destroyed; six other outbuildings sustained considerable roof damage.							
EF0	Breeding	Adair	KY	36.963°N 85.42°W	2258 – 2300	1.5 mi (2.4 km)	35 yd (32 m)	$1,000
EF0	A narrow tornado destroyed an outbuilding and uprooted several trees.							
EF0	Lone Rock	Richland	WI	43.1812°N 90.1957°W	2333 – 2335	0.05 mi (0.080 km)	50 yd (46 m)	$10,000
EF0	One home sustained roof damage while another had two trees collapsed onto it. Other trees were snapped.							
EF3	E of Nickerson	Rice, Reno	KS	38.19°N 97.99°W	2334 – 2356	5.32 mi (8.56 km)	350 yd (320 m)	$270,000
EF3	An unanchored home was swept clean from its foundation by this slow-moving high-end EF3 stovepipe tornado. Two other homes sustained minor damage. Many large hardwood trees were uprooted while others were reduced to completely debarked trunks.							
EF0	SW of Peytonsburg	Cumberland, Clay	KY, TN	36.6276°N 85.4374°W	0013 – 0021	1.45 mi (2.33 km)	100 yd (91 m)	$70,000
EF0	Several outbuildings were damaged or destroyed. A few homes sustained roof damage. Numerous trees and power lines were downed.							
EF0	SE of Boswell	Benton	IN	40.5°N 87.36°W	0059 – 0100	0.1 mi (0.16 km)	50 yd (46 m)	$0
EF0	Trained storm spotters observed a brief tornado over an open field.							
EF0	SE of Pine Village	Warren	IN	40.4344°N 87.2118°W	0115	0.01 mi (0.016 km)	50 yd (46 m)	$750
EF0	A brief tornado caused minor crop damage in a corn field.							
EF1	NE of Greencastle	Putnam	IN	39.7438°N 86.7034°W	0125 – 0128	0.6 mi (0.97 km)	50 yd (46 m)	$50,000
EF1	An NWS survey found tornado damage embedded within a larger area of downburst damage.							
EF1	NNE of Greencastle	Putnam	IN	39.7472°N 86.7403°W	0127 – 0128	0.07 mi (0.11 km)	25 yd (23 m)	$5,000
EF1	Numerous trees were snapped.							

=== July 14 event ===
List of confirmed tornadoes – Tuesday, July 14, 2015
EF#	Location	County / Parish	State	Start Coord.	Time (UTC)	Path length	Max width	Damage (2015 USD)
EF0	SSW of Alto	Kent	MI	42.81°N 85.41°W	0515 – 0517	0.8 mi (1.3 km)	50 yd (46 m)	$50,000
EF0	Numerous trees were snapped or uprooted and one home sustained roof damage.							
EF1	S of Byrdstown to WSW of Jamestown	Pickett, Fentress	TN	36.4924°N 85.127°W	1846 – 1905	10.53 mi (16.95 km)	300 yd (270 m)	$60,000
EF1	Numerous trees and power lines were snapped or uprooted. A home sustained moderate roof and siding damage while a mobile home sustained minor roof damage.							
EF1	W of Cookeville	Putnam	TN	36.1713°N 85.5982°W	1949 – 1955	2.76 mi (4.44 km)	150 yd (140 m)	$100,000
EF1	One business sustained extensive damage while 30 homes, barns, and outbuildings sustained minor to moderate damage. Numerous trees and power lines were downed.							
EF1	S of Madisonville	Monroe	TN	35.4641°N 84.3824°W	2055 – 2107	7.85 mi (12.63 km)	200 yd (180 m)	$0
EF1	Large trees were snapped and uprooted.							
EF1	NE of Flemingsburg	Fleming	KY	38.458°N 83.6965°W	2138 – 2139	0.5 mi (0.80 km)	200 yd (180 m)	$50,000
EF1	A mobile home was pushed several feet of its foundation and had its roof ripped off. Barns were damaged or destroyed.							
EF1	SE of Greensburg	Green	KY	37.20°N 85.44°W	~2200	1.1 mi (1.8 km)	50 yd (46 m)	Unknown
EF1	A mobile home, two barns, and six outbuildings were destroyed.							
EF1	Sheffield	Colbert	AL	34.7687°N 87.7084°W	2300 – 2313	9.12 mi (14.68 km)	250 yd (230 m)	Unknown
EF1	Several homes sustained minor roof and structural damage. Numerous trees were snapped or uprooted, causing damage to many homes upon falling. Power poles were leaned or snapped, transmission lines were bent over, and a large light tower was completely destroyed. An unanchored building was rolled, and a car dealership sustained minor damage.							
EF1	W of Town Creek to SE of Courtland	Lawrence	AL	34.6875°N 87.4294°W	2314 – 2325	11.43 mi (18.39 km)	250 yd (230 m)	Unknown
EF1	A high school had its metal roof bent and several shingles removed. A residence had its porch damaged. Numerous trees were snapped or uprooted, causing damage to a few homes upon falling. Power lines were downed.							
EF0	E of Littleville	Colbert, Lawrence	AL	34.6032°N 87.5256°W	2318 – 2323	2.67 mi (4.30 km)	50 yd (46 m)	$0
EF0	Numerous trees were snapped or uprooted.							
EF0	SE of Huntsville International Airport	Madison	AL	34.6115°N 86.7527°W	2335 – 2337	0.91 mi (1.46 km)	75 yd (69 m)	Unknown
EF0	A metal billboard sign was twisted. Several homes sustained damage, primarily to their fences and roofs. Small plastic sheds were damaged.							
EF0	S of Priceville	Morgan	AL	34.4992°N 86.8958°W	2348 – 2350	0.77 mi (1.24 km)	100 yd (91 m)	Unknown
EF0	Two trees were uprooted while others had their limbs snapped. A home sustained damage to its roof, siding, and gutters after a large portion of a tree was toppled.							
EF1	WNW of Eva	Morgan, Cullman	AL	34.3547°N 86.8371°W	2359 – 0005	4.92 mi (7.92 km)	300 yd (270 m)	Unknown
EF1	A few large trees were uprooted while others had their limbs snapped. A home lost considerable amounts of siding.							

=== July 16 event ===
List of confirmed tornadoes – Thursday, July 16, 2015
EF#	Location	County / Parish	State	Start Coord.	Time (UTC)	Path length	Max width	Damage (2015 USD)
EF0	S of Swedesburg	Henry	IA	41.0828°N 91.5789°W	2214 – 2215	1.51 mi (2.43 km)	10 yd (9.1 m)	$0
EF0	A brief tornado caused no damage.							
EF1	SW of Gladstone	Henderson	IL	40.8328°N 90.9995°W	2309 – 2312	0.84 mi (1.35 km)	100 yd (91 m)	$25,000
EF1	Trees and outbuildings were destroyed.							
EF1	N of Smithshire to S of Kirkwood	Warren	IL	40.8338°N 90.772°W	2349 – 2351	1.41 mi (2.27 km)	50 yd (46 m)	$2,000
EF1	Trees and outbuildings were damaged. A semi-trailer truck was blown over.							
EF1	NE of Port Byron	Rock Island	IL	41.615°N 90.3226°W	0000 – 0003	1.11 mi (1.79 km)	200 yd (180 m)	$0
EF1	Large trees were snapped or uprooted, and several homes had siding and portions of their roofs torn off.							
EF2	E of Kirkwood	Warren	IL	40.8741°N 90.7009°W	0009 – 0013	1.72 mi (2.77 km)	300 yd (270 m)	$150,000
EF2	A cattle barn and a grain bin were destroyed. Several power poles were snapped.							
EF2	SE of Monmouth to E of Cameron	Warren	IL	40.8892°N 90.5936°W	0013 – 0034	5.95 mi (9.58 km)	700 yd (640 m)	$1,500,000
EF2	A large multiple-vortex tornado caused considerable damage in the town of Cameron, where homes had their roofs torn off, trees were snapped, and large grain bins were destroyed. Garages and outbuildings were destroyed as well.							
EF0	SW of Osage	Mitchell	IA	43.2575°N 92.9408°W	0134 – 0136	2.07 mi (3.33 km)	40 yd (37 m)	$50,000
EF0	A garage was flipped and damaged, a barn was destroyed, and a house sustained siding damage. Multiple trees were snapped or uprooted, and powerlines were downed.							
EF0	SSW of Sterling	Whiteside	IL	41.72°N 89.7°W	0148 – 0149	0.55 mi (0.89 km)	10 yd (9.1 m)	$0
EF0	A trained storm spotter observed a brief tornado in open country.							
EF2	Southern Delavan	Tazewell	IL	40.3618°N 89.5496°W	0439 – 0446	2.39 mi (3.85 km)	250 yd (230 m)	$1,210,000
EF2	Tornado touched down to the southwest of Delavan and struck the south edge of town, where numerous homes were damaged. Some of the homes had their roofs torn off, and one lost its second story. Numerous trees were snapped and uprooted, one of which was ripped out of the ground and tossed some distance. Barns, garages and outbuildings were completely destroyed as well. Trees and gravestones were damaged at a cemetery before the tornado dissipated. A total of 51 homes in Delavan were damaged, 15 of which were damaged severely. The tornado developed and dissipated so quickly that a tornado warning was never issued.							

=== July 17 event ===
List of confirmed tornadoes – Friday, July 17, 2015
EF#	Location	County / Parish	State	Start Coord.	Time (UTC)	Path length	Max width	Damage (2015 USD)
EF1	SE of Lafayette	Tippecanoe	IN	40.3105°N 86.7519°W	2033 – 2034	0.21 mi (0.34 km)	75 yd (69 m)	$35,000
EF1	Numerous trees were sheared off or downed. A garage at a residence was destroyed.							
EF1	Monroe	Tippecanoe	IN	40.2811°N 86.7357°W	2038 – 2039	0.38 mi (0.61 km)	100 yd (91 m)	$30,000
EF1	A garage was collapsed, a home had its vinyl siding removed, and trees were downed.							
EF0	ENE of Langford	Marshall	SD	45.6146°N 97.7527°W	0010 – 0015	0.42 mi (0.68 km)	50 yd (46 m)	Unknown
EF0	A cornfield was damaged and many hay bales were moved.							
EF0	ESE of Grenville	Day	SD	45.457°N 97.349°W	0047 – 0052	1.68 mi (2.70 km)	100 yd (91 m)	Unknown
EF0	A barn suffered significant roof damage, a horse trailer was rolled, and several trees in shelterbelts were damaged.							
EF1	Hollywood	Carver	MN	44.945°N 93.9889°W	0456 – 0502	5.14 mi (8.27 km)	100 yd (91 m)	$350,000
EF1	Numerous trees were snapped and an apple orchard was damaged. A private weather station measured a wind gust of 99 mph (159 km/h) before being ripped off a roof.							

=== July 18 event ===
List of confirmed tornadoes – Saturday, July 18, 2015
EF#	Location	County / Parish	State	Start Coord.	Time (UTC)	Path length	Max width	Damage (2015 USD)
EF0	N of North Oaks	Ramsey	MN	45.0988°N 93.1152°W	0600 – 0603	1.87 mi (3.01 km)	75 yd (69 m)	$500,000
EF0	Trees were toppled and snapped, some of which damaged houses, vehicles, and other structures upon falling.							
EF1	N of Eau Galle	Dunn	WI	44.7077°N 92.0214°W	0652 – 0659	5.25 mi (8.45 km)	50 yd (46 m)	$10,000
EF1	Trees were snapped or uprooted and power lines were downed. A home weather station recorded a wind gust of 88 mph (142 km/h).							
EF0	S of Conception	Wabasha	MN	44.2418°N 92.0943°W	0702 – 0703	0.01 mi (0.016 km)	25 yd (23 m)	$17,000
EF0	The tops were ripped off two silos, some corn was damaged, garage doors were blown in, and tires were moved off a silage pile.							
EF0	NE of Lawrence	McHenry	IL	42.45°N 88.6°W	1919 – 1920	0.1 mi (0.16 km)	50 yd (46 m)	$0
EF0	Minor tree damage was observed.							
EF0	ESE of Alden	McHenry	IL	42.46°N 88.48°W	1938 – 1939	0.1 mi (0.16 km)	50 yd (46 m)	$0
EF0	Trained storm spotters reported a brief tornado.							
EF1	SW of Richmond	Rock, Walworth	WI	42.709°N 88.8132°W	1940 – 1950	4.94 mi (7.95 km)	50 yd (46 m)	$182,000
EF1	A machine shed was completely destroyed. Three old barns were mostly destroyed. The roof to a modern pole barn was ripped off, a 2 by 4 was lodged into a vehicle that had its windows blown out, fields of corn were partially blown over, and trees were snapped.							

=== July 19 event ===
List of confirmed tornadoes – Sunday, July 19, 2015
EF#	Location	County / Parish	State	Start Coord.	Time (UTC)	Path length	Max width	Damage (2015 USD)
EF0	N of Landers	San Bernardino	CA	34.2997°N 116.4015°W	0000 – 0001	0.24 mi (0.39 km)	50 yd (46 m)	$0
EF0	Two brief landspout tornadoes were observed.							

=== July 20 event ===
List of confirmed tornadoes – Monday, July 20, 2015
EF#	Location	County / Parish	State	Start Coord.	Time (UTC)	Path length	Max width	Damage (2015 USD)
EF0	SE of Constantia	Lassen	CA	39.9445°N 120.0153°W	0145 – 0205	3.15 mi (5.07 km)	20 yd (18 m)	$0
EF0	Posts on social media revealed evidence of a landspout tornado.							

=== July 21 event ===
List of confirmed tornadoes – Tuesday, July 21, 2015
EF#	Location	County / Parish	State	Start Coord.	Time (UTC)	Path length	Max width	Damage (2015 USD)
EF1	E of Deckers	Douglas	CO	39.2681°N 105.1055°W	2005 – 2008	0.29 mi (0.47 km)	100 yd (91 m)	$0
EF1	Six acres of trees in the Pike National Forest were downed.							

=== July 23 event ===
List of confirmed tornadoes – Thursday, July 23, 2015
EF#	Location	County / Parish	State	Start Coord.	Time (UTC)	Path length	Max width	Damage (2015 USD)
EF0	SSW of Thedford	Thomas	NE	41.91°N 100.61°W	2147	0.1 mi (0.16 km)	10 yd (9.1 m)	$0
EF0	An off-duty NWS employee reported a brief tornado in open range land.							
EF1	S of Huron	Beadle	SD	44.2042°N 98.2169°W	0130 – 0205	2.8 mi (4.5 km)	440 yd (400 m)	$50,000
EF1	A partially anchored storage shed was destroyed. Homes sustained roof and siding damage. A garage was damaged, power poles were downed, a fifth wheel camper was tossed 75 yd (69 m), and crops were damaged.							
EF0	WNW of Fedora	Miner	SD	44.046°N 97.8383°W	0307 – 0316	0.66 mi (1.06 km)	150 yd (140 m)	Unknown
EF0	A tornado damaged crops.							
EF0	N of Roswell	Miner	SD	44.0447°N 97.7017°W	0325 – 0330	0.81 mi (1.30 km)	250 yd (230 m)	Unknown
EF0	A tornado damaged crops.							
EF1	Tolna	Nelson	ND	47.83°N 98.44°W	0336 – 0340	0.5 mi (0.80 km)	350 yd (320 m)	Unknown
EF1	Several trees were uprooted, a tower was bent, and a quonset storage building was blown off its foundation.							
EF0	NW of Howard	Miner	SD	44.0429°N 97.6252°W	0349 – 0400	1.61 mi (2.59 km)	250 yd (230 m)	Unknown
EF0	Crops, including grassland, were damaged.							
EF1	WNW of Buxton	Traill	ND	47.62°N 97.28°W	0451 – 0453	0.4 mi (0.64 km)	25 yd (23 m)	$0
EF1	A mature tree was snapped and numerous large branches were downed.							

=== July 24 event ===
List of confirmed tornadoes – Friday, July 24, 2015
EF#	Location	County / Parish	State	Start Coord.	Time (UTC)	Path length	Max width	Damage (2015 USD)
EF1	WNW of Buxton	Norman	MN	47.47°N 96.23°W	0546 – 0551	5.4 mi (8.7 km)	500 yd (460 m)	Unknown
EF1	Numerous trees were snapped, a house and a storage building sustained minor damage, and a power pole was cracked.							
EF0	N of Ormsby	Watonwan	MN	43.8908°N 94.6902°W	2340 – 2341	0.34 mi (0.55 km)	25 yd (23 m)	$100,000
EF0	A storage building and piles of tiling were damaged.							

=== July 25 event ===
List of confirmed tornadoes – Saturday, July 25, 2015
EF#	Location	County / Parish	State	Start Coord.	Time (UTC)	Path length	Max width	Damage (2015 USD)
EF0	NW of Leola	McPherson	SD	45.77°N 99.01°W	2144 – 2146	0.09 mi (0.14 km)	10 yd (9.1 m)	$0
EF0	A storm chaser observed a brief tornado in an open field.							
EF0	WNW of Leola	McPherson	SD	45.74°N 99°W	2205 – 2207	0.18 mi (0.29 km)	20 yd (18 m)	$0
EF0	A storm chaser observed a brief tornado in an open field.							

=== July 26 event ===
List of confirmed tornadoes – Sunday, July 26, 2015
EF#	Location	County / Parish	State	Start Coord.	Time (UTC)	Path length	Max width	Damage (2015 USD)
EF0	S of Tioga	Williams	ND	48.21°N 102.97°W	2025 – 2031	3.09 mi (4.97 km)	50 yd (46 m)	$0
EF0	A trained storm spotter reported a tornado over open country.							
EF0	N of Mescalero	Otero	NM	33.3598°N 105.7681°W	2040 – 2046	0.21 mi (0.34 km)	20 yd (18 m)	$0
EF0	Videos of a landspout tornado were published to social media.							
EF0	ENE of Valentine	Cherry	NE	42.92°N 100.39°W	2337	0.1 mi (0.16 km)	10 yd (9.1 m)	$0
EF0	Law enforcement reported a brief tornado in an open field.							
EF0	SSW of Long Pine	Brown	NE	42.47°N 99.74°W	0005	0.1 mi (0.16 km)	10 yd (9.1 m)	$0
EF0	Members of a fire department reported a brief tornado in an open field.							

=== July 30 event ===
List of confirmed tornadoes – Thursday, July 30, 2015
EF#	Location	County / Parish	State	Start Coord.	Time (UTC)	Path length	Max width	Damage (2015 USD)
EF0	Warner	Merrimack	NH	43.2866°N 71.8285°W	2153 – 2200	0.42 mi (0.68 km)	100 yd (91 m)	Unknown
EF0	Approximately 25 trees were snapped or uprooted, and a large storage building had a portion of its roof ripped off.							

=== July 31 event ===
List of confirmed tornadoes – Friday, July 31, 2015
EF#	Location	County / Parish	State	Start Coord.	Time (UTC)	Path length	Max width	Damage (2015 USD)
EF0	NNE of Safford	Graham	AZ	32.8641°N 109.7089°W	2330 – 2340	0.58 mi (0.93 km)	15 yd (14 m)	$0
EF0	A small landspout tornado was reported.							

== August ==
Confirmed tornadoes by Enhanced Fujita rating
EFU	EF0	EF1	EF2	EF3	EF4	EF5	Total
0	34	13	0	0	0	0	47

=== August 2 event ===
List of confirmed tornadoes – Sunday, August 2, 2015
EF#	Location	County / Parish	State	Start Coord.	Time (UTC)	Path length	Max width	Damage (2015 USD)
EF0	S of North Platte	Lincoln	NE	Unknown	2025 – 2027	0.1 mi (0.16 km)	10 yd (9.1 m)	$0
EF0	Law enforcement observed a brief landspout tornado.							
EF0	S of North Platte	Lincoln	NE	Unknown	2035 – 2038	0.1 mi (0.16 km)	10 yd (9.1 m)	$0
EF0	A member of the public reported a brief landspout tornado.							
EF1	Owendale	Huron	MI	43.7278°N 83.3179°W	2239 – 2244	6.95 mi (11.18 km)	100 yd (91 m)	$50,000
EF1	The roof and walls of a barn were destroyed, outbuildings were destroyed, and siding was peeled off a garage. A small warehouse had its garage doors blown in, cinder block wall blown out, and roof uplifted. Numerous trees were snapped or uprooted.							
EF1	WSW of Fisk to S of Nevinville	Adair, Adams	IA	41.1807°N 94.5778°W	2321 – 2357	4.97 mi (8.00 km)	300 yd (270 m)	$235,000
EF1	Multiple buildings were damaged near the hamlet of Williamson.							
EF1	Round Lake to ESE of Gages Lake	Lake	IL	42.3503°N 88.0972°W	0138 – 0153	7.51 mi (12.09 km)	300 yd (270 m)	$1,000,000
EF1	Hundreds of trees were damaged, including dozens that were snapped at their bases or uprooted. A roof was blown off a restaurant, with a sign carried 2 mi (3.2 km) downstream. Several homes and businesses sustained roof damage from fallen trees or loss of shingles. A large portion of a roof was ripped off a high school, and a skate park was heavily damaged.							

=== August 3 event ===
List of confirmed tornadoes – Monday, August 3, 2015
EF#	Location	County / Parish	State	Start Coord.	Time (UTC)	Path length	Max width	Damage (2015 USD)
EF0	N of Palm Beach Gardens	Palm Beach	FL	26.6475°N 80.1788°W	1956 – 2005	0.1 mi (0.16 km)	10 yd (9.1 m)	Unknown
EF0	Soccer goals and a judge's stand were damaged, a power transformer was blown, the roof was ripped off a structure in a park, and trees and large branches were downed.							
EF0	WSW of Palm Beach Gardens	Palm Beach	FL	26.7838°N 80.146°W	2005 – 2007	0.04 mi (0.064 km)	1 yd (0.91 m)	$0
EF0	A brief tornado was observed by eyewitnesses and documented on video.							

=== August 4 event ===
List of confirmed tornadoes – Tuesday, August 4, 2015
EF#	Location	County / Parish	State	Start Coord.	Time (UTC)	Path length	Max width	Damage (2015 USD)
EF0	Saxis	Accomack	VA	37.93°N 75.72°W	0020 – 0025	1.76 mi (2.83 km)	25 yd (23 m)	$2,000
EF0	Large tree limbs were downed, and debris was blown around.							

=== August 6 event ===
List of confirmed tornadoes – Thursday, August 6, 2015
EF#	Location	County / Parish	State	Start Coord.	Time (UTC)	Path length	Max width	Damage (2015 USD)
EF0	ESE of Swift Falls	Swift	MN	45.3682°N 95.3303°W	2105 – 2106	0.1 mi (0.16 km)	15 yd (14 m)	$0
EF0	Multiple storm chasers and fire department personnel observed a tornado over a corn field.							
EF0	ESE of Swift Falls	Swift	MN	45.3612°N 95.2815°W	2109 – 2110	0.15 mi (0.24 km)	15 yd (14 m)	$0
EF0	Multiple storm chasers observed a tornado over a corn field.							
EF0	WNW of New London	Kandiyohi	MN	45.344°N 95.1285°W	2159 – 2200	0.09 mi (0.14 km)	25 yd (23 m)	$0
EF0	Multiple storm chasers and fire department personnel observed a tornado over a corn field.							
EF0	WNW of New London	Kandiyohi	MN	45.3434°N 95.1084°W	2203 – 2204	0.09 mi (0.14 km)	25 yd (23 m)	$0
EF0	Multiple storm chasers observed a tornado over an open field.							
EF1	S of Canby	Yellow Medicine	MN	44.6474°N 96.3082°W	2221 – 2224	1.95 mi (3.14 km)	440 yd (400 m)	$500,000
EF1	Several outbuildings were destroyed, hundreds of trees were snapped or uprooted, seven large hay bales were blown apart, and crops were damaged.							
EF0	ESE of Hawick	Kandiyohi	MN	45.3441°N 94.833°W	2307 – 2310	0.58 mi (0.93 km)	25 yd (23 m)	$0
EF0	A few trees were damaged and portions of metal roofing were removed from several storage sheds or outbuildings.							
EF0	NNW of Volga	Brookings	SD	44.37°N 96.95°W	2333 – 2335	0.6 mi (0.97 km)	50 yd (46 m)	Unknown
EF0	Corn crops were damaged.							
EF0	Brookings	Brookings	SD	44.2856°N 96.8155°W	0000 – 0007	0.84 mi (1.35 km)	50 yd (46 m)	$80,000
EF0	Three homes sustained damage to their roofs, siding, and gutters. Another home sustained damage to its roof, patio deck, chimney, and garage. A fence was damaged.							
EF1	W of Mecca	Riverside	CA	33.5357°N 116.1234°W	0030 – 0115	3.98 mi (6.41 km)	900 yd (820 m)	$18,000,000
EF1	Numerous power poles were downed.							
EF0	SW of Columbus	Russell	AL	32.3139°N 85.0847°W	0140 – 0144	1.92 mi (3.09 km)	250 yd (230 m)	$0
EF0	Sporadic tree damage was observed, including one tree that was downed. Unsecured objects and outbuildings were damaged.							
EF1	SE of Troy	Pike	AL	31.7817°N 85.9403°W	0335 – 0336	0.39 mi (0.63 km)	50 yd (46 m)	$0
EF1	A local Walmart had a portion of its roof collapsed and entrance damaged. An empty tractor trailer was pushed 100 yd (91 m) into a second tractor trailer, damaging both. A third tractor trailer sustained major damage after being overturned. A strip mall had its front glass walls and a portion of a masonry wall collapsed. A gas station canopy and a convenience store sustained minor damage.							

=== August 8 event ===
List of confirmed tornadoes – Saturday, August 8, 2015
EF#	Location	County / Parish	State	Start Coord.	Time (UTC)	Path length	Max width	Damage (2015 USD)
EF0	WNW of Indian Pass	Gulf	FL	29.6922°N 85.2891°W	1918 – 1920	0.45 mi (0.72 km)	50 yd (46 m)	$0
EF0	Minor damage to trees was reported.							
EF1	SE of Beaver Crossing	Lawrence	SD	44.369°N 103.987°W	2050 – 2053	1.45 mi (2.33 km)	33 yd (30 m)	$5,000
EF1	Aspen, birch, and ponderosa pine trees were downed and snapped.							
EF0	W of Hanston	Hodgeman	KS	38.13°N 99.82°W	2215 – 2220	0.23 mi (0.37 km)	50 yd (46 m)	$0
EF0	A storm chaser observed a landspout tornado.							
EF1	SE of Elk Creek	Pawnee, Richardson	NE	40.2576°N 96.0134°W	0155 – 0212	2.16 mi (3.48 km)	238 yd (218 m)	$0
EF1	Tree and crop damage was observed.							

=== August 9 event ===
List of confirmed tornadoes – Sunday, August 9, 2015
EF#	Location	County / Parish	State	Start Coord.	Time (UTC)	Path length	Max width	Damage (2015 USD)
EF0	SW of Storla	Aurora	SD	43.81°N 98.44°W	2035 – 2036	0.32 mi (0.51 km)	50 yd (46 m)	$0
EF0	A storm chaser reported a brief landspout tornado.							

=== August 10 event ===
List of confirmed tornadoes – Monday, August 10, 2015
EF#	Location	County / Parish	State	Start Coord.	Time (UTC)	Path length	Max width	Damage (2015 USD)
EF0	NE of Germantown	Washington	WI	43.2454°N 88.0798°W	1912 – 1914	0.8 mi (1.3 km)	50 yd (46 m)	$0
EF0	Small branches and twigs were downed.							
EF0	NNW of Mequon	Ozaukee	WI	43.2459°N 88.0639°W	1914 – 1915	0.18 mi (0.29 km)	50 yd (46 m)	$1,000
EF0	A tree was uprooted and small branches and twigs were downed.							
EF0	NW of Chicora	Butler	PA	40.9977°N 79.9056°W	0145 – 0146	0.58 mi (0.93 km)	60 yd (55 m)	$25,000
EF0	The roof was ripped off a service station, the deck on a house was destroyed, and large trees were uprooted.							

=== August 13 event ===
List of confirmed tornadoes – Thursday, August 13, 2015
EF#	Location	County / Parish	State	Start Coord.	Time (UTC)	Path length	Max width	Damage (2015 USD)
EF0	SW of Pahokee	Palm Beach	FL	26.8025°N 80.6913°W	2140 – 2145	0.25 mi (0.40 km)	20 yd (18 m)	$0
EF0	A tornado was observed over an open field.							

=== August 16 event ===
List of confirmed tornadoes – Sunday, August 16, 2015
EF#	Location	County / Parish	State	Start Coord.	Time (UTC)	Path length	Max width	Damage (2015 USD)
EF0	SSE of Gill	Weld	CO	40.4°N 104.49°W	2159	0.01 mi (0.016 km)	50 yd (46 m)	$0
EF0	A brief tornado was observed.							

=== August 17 event ===
List of confirmed tornadoes – Monday, August 17, 2015
EF#	Location	County / Parish	State	Start Coord.	Time (UTC)	Path length	Max width	Damage (2015 USD)
EF0	N of Elbert	Elbert	CO	39.29°N 104.53°W	2112 – 2117	0.01 mi (0.016 km)	50 yd (46 m)	$0
EF0	A trained storm spotter observed a tornado.							
EF0	SW of Collins	Covington	MS	31.5904°N 89.5962°W	2114 – 2119	2.77 mi (4.46 km)	100 yd (91 m)	$15,000
EF0	The tops were snapped off several trees, and numerous large limbs were downed. Two power poles were downed, and a carport was flipped.							
EF0	SSE of Shamrock	Adams	CO	39.77°N 103.72°W	2234 – 2235	0.01 mi (0.016 km)	50 yd (46 m)	$0
EF0	A trained storm spotter observed a brief tornado.							
EF1	Genoa	Lincoln	CO	39.2732°N 103.5008°W	2355	0.01 mi (0.016 km)	100 yd (91 m)	$50,000
EF1	An outbuilding was destroyed, and a nearby home sustained minor damage.							
EF1	ESE of Genoa	Lincoln	CO	39.2716°N 103.482°W	0100	0.01 mi (0.016 km)	100 yd (91 m)	$200,000
EF1	Two grain silos were destroyed, and nearby power lines were downed.							

=== August 18 event ===
List of confirmed tornadoes – Tuesday, August 18, 2015
EF#	Location	County / Parish	State	Start Coord.	Time (UTC)	Path length	Max width	Damage (2015 USD)
EF0	NW of Stanwood	Cedar	IA	41.9241°N 91.1838°W	2013 – 2014	0.05 mi (0.080 km)	20 yd (18 m)	$0
EF0	A tornado touched down in a farm field.							
EF0	E of Cornell	Livingston	IL	40.98°N 88.72°W	2132 – 2133	0.03 mi (0.048 km)	25 yd (23 m)	$0
EF0	Law enforcement reported a brief tornado.							
EF0	S of Pontiac	Livingston	IL	40.8°N 88.64°W	2205 – 2206	0.04 mi (0.064 km)	25 yd (23 m)	$0
EF0	A trained storm spotter observed a brief tornado.							
EF0	E of Mackinaw	Tazewell	IL	40.5264°N 89.3225°W	2309 – 2311	2.01 mi (3.23 km)	75 yd (69 m)	$38,000
EF0	Several pine trees and crops were damaged, and limbs were downed onto three houses.							
EF0	Southeastern Naperville	Will, DuPage	IL	41.7166°N 88.1079°W	0055 – 0100	3.19 mi (5.13 km)	75 yd (69 m)	$0
EF0	A softwood tree was uprooted, and several hardwood trees were snapped or damaged.							
EF0	W of Downers Grove	Du Page	IL	41.7981°N 88.0144°W	0106 – 0107	0.24 mi (0.39 km)	75 yd (69 m)	$50,000
EF0	A few hardwood trees were snapped; one tree fell and downed a power pole which crushed a car and resulted in minor damage to a garage.							
EF1	W of Lyons	Walworth	WI	42.5881°N 88.4311°W	0156 – 0206	4.93 mi (7.93 km)	75 yd (69 m)	$100,000
EF1	Significant roof damage was inflicted to four buildings; one of the buildings had one of its walls collapsed. A mobile home and a barn sustained minor damage, a few large retail signs were destroyed, and many trees were snapped and uprooted.							
EF0	Caldwell	Racine	WI	42.832°N 88.2669°W	0225 – 0228	0.97 mi (1.56 km)	25 yd (23 m)	$1,000
EF0	Sporadic tree damage was observed.							
EF1	NE of Caldwell	Waukesha	WI	42.842°N 88.2533°W	0228 – 0232	1.5 mi (2.4 km)	50 yd (46 m)	$45,000
EF1	A metal building system had a portion of its roof ripped off, and two residential homes sustained minor roof damage. Five wooden power poles were snapped. A few whole trees were snapped while many branches were snapped.							
EF0	E of Bethesda	Waukesha	WI	42.9785°N 88.2559°W	0250 – 0253	0.64 mi (1.03 km)	25 yd (23 m)	$10,000
EF0	A few whole trees were snapped while many branches were snapped; one branch landed on a car. A large wooden toy set sustained some damage, and a wall was removed from a small shed.							

=== August 20 event ===
List of confirmed tornadoes – Thursday, August 20, 2015
EF#	Location	County / Parish	State	Start Coord.	Time (UTC)	Path length	Max width	Damage (2015 USD)
EF1	S of Mifflinburg	Union	PA	40.8899°N 77.0404°W	2205 – 2206	0.19 mi (0.31 km)	100 yd (91 m)	$40,000
EF1	A large shed was destroyed, and the roof was partially torn off a barn.							

=== August 28 event ===
List of confirmed tornadoes – Friday, August 28, 2015
EF#	Location	County / Parish	State	Start Coord.	Time (UTC)	Path length	Max width	Damage (2015 USD)
EF0	WSW of Annelly	Harvey	KS	37.96°N 97.24°W	2340 – 2344	0.15 mi (0.24 km)	40 yd (37 m)	$0
EF0	An off-duty National Weather Service employee observed a landspout tornado.							

=== August 29 event ===
List of confirmed tornadoes – Saturday, August 29, 2015
EF#	Location	County / Parish	State	Start Coord.	Time (UTC)	Path length	Max width	Damage (2015 USD)
EF0	WNW of Vail	Pima	AZ	32.0726°N 110.78°W	2138 – 2142	0.43 mi (0.69 km)	15 yd (14 m)	$0
EF0	A weak landspout tornado was observed.							

== See also ==
- Tornadoes of 2015
- List of United States tornadoes from April to May 2015
- List of United States tornadoes from September to October 2015
