= Tichigan, Wisconsin =

Census-designated place in Wisconsin, United States

- Census-designated place
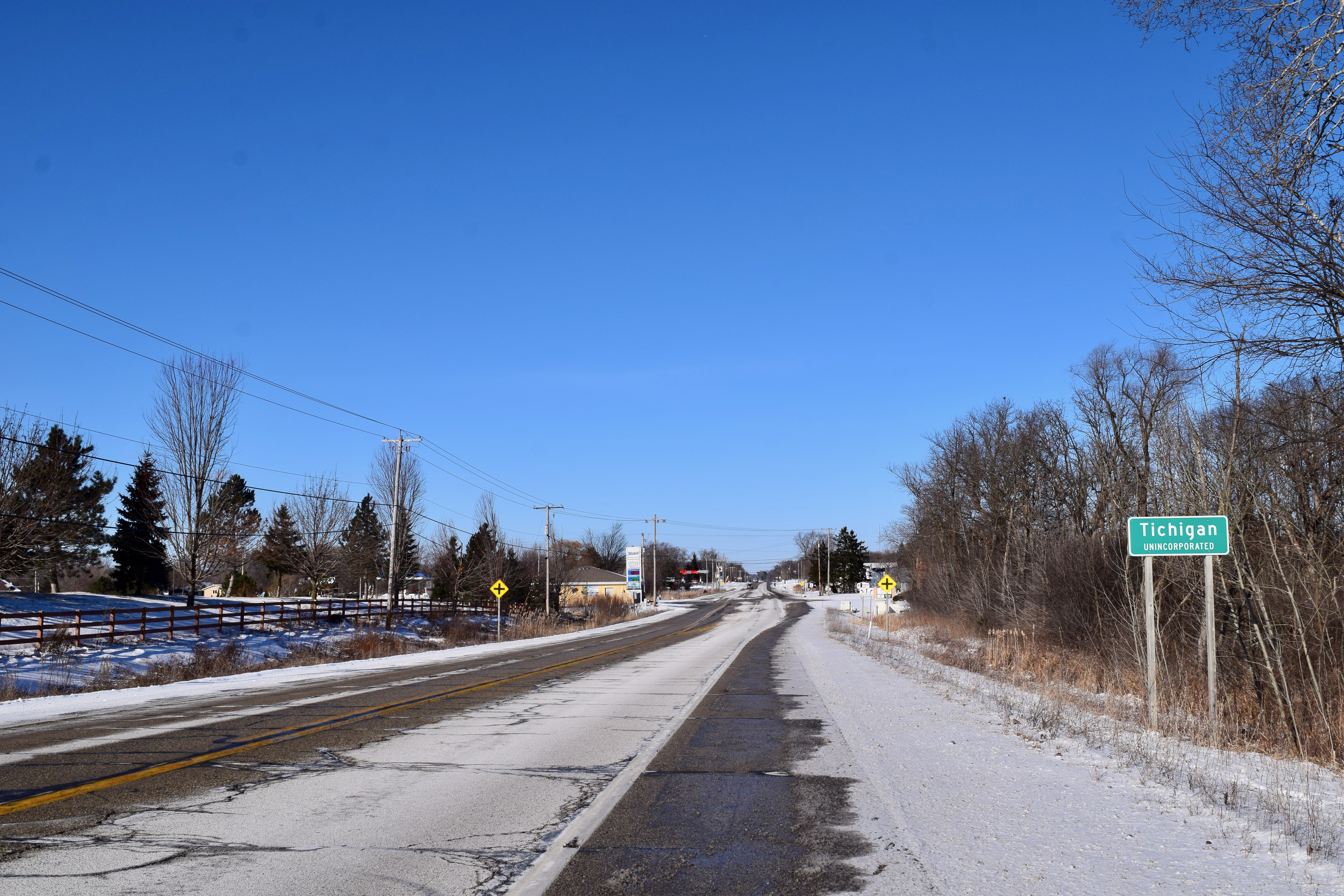
- Entering Tichigan from the south on Highway 164

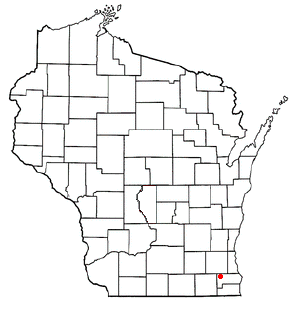
- Location of Tichigan, Wisconsin
- Coordinates: 42°49′44″N 88°11′51″W
- Country: United States
- State: Wisconsin
- County: Racine

Area
  - Total: 13.270 sq mi (34.37 km^{2})
  - Land: 11.225 sq mi (29.07 km^{2})
  - Water: 1.985 sq mi (5.14 km^{2})
- Elevation: 794 ft (242 m)

Population (2020)
  - Total: 5,277
  - Density: 470.1/sq mi (181.5/km^{2})
- Time zone: UTC-6 (Central (CST))
  - Summer (DST): UTC-5 (CDT)
- Area code: 262
- GNIS feature ID: 1575437

Tichigan (formerly known as Waterford North) is a census-designated place (CDP) in the Town of Waterford, Racine County, Wisconsin, United States. The population was 5,277 at the 2020 census.

== Geography ==
Tichigan is located at 42°48′20″N 88°13′00″W (42.805631, −88.216593).

According to the United States Census Bureau, the CDP has a total area of 13.270 square miles (34.37 km^{2}), of which 11.225 square miles (29.07 km^{2}) is land and 1.985 square miles (5.14 km^{2}) (14.96%) is water.

== Demographics ==
Historical population
Census	Pop.	Note	%±
1990	1,604		—
2000	4,761		196.8%
2010	5,133		7.8%
2020	5,277		2.8%

As of the census of 2000, there were 4,761 people, 1,688 households, and 1,358 families residing in the CDP. The population density was 161.1 people/km^{2} (417 people/mi^{2}). There were 1,851 housing units at an average density of 62.6 units/km^{2} (162 units/mi^{2}). The racial makeup of the CDP was 98.47% White, 0.36% African American, 0.13% Native American, 0.21% Asian, 0.02% Pacific Islander, 0.17% from other races, and 0.65% from two or more races. Hispanic or Latino of any race were 1.39% of the population.

There were 1,688 households, out of which 40.8% had children under the age of 18 living with them, 70.8% were married couples living together, 4.9% had a female householder with no husband present, and 19.5% were non-families. 14.0% of all households were made up of individuals, and 3.8% had someone living alone who was 65 years of age or older. The average household size was 2.82 and the average family size was 3.13.

In the CDP, the population was spread out, with 28.6% under the age of 18, 5.3% from 18 to 24, 34.6% from 25 to 44, 24.5% from 45 to 64, and 7.0% who were 65 years of age or older. The median age was 36 years. For every 100 females, there were 108.8 males. For every 100 females age 18 and over, there were 104.3 males.

The median income for a household in the CDP was $67,513, and the median income for a family was $68,642. Males had a median income of $47,090 versus $31,250 for females. The per capita income for the CDP was $24,402. About 0.8% of families and 1.9% of the population were below the poverty line, including 0.7% of those under age 18 and 6.6% of those age 65 or over.
