= Waterford (town), Wisconsin =

Town of Waterford
- Town
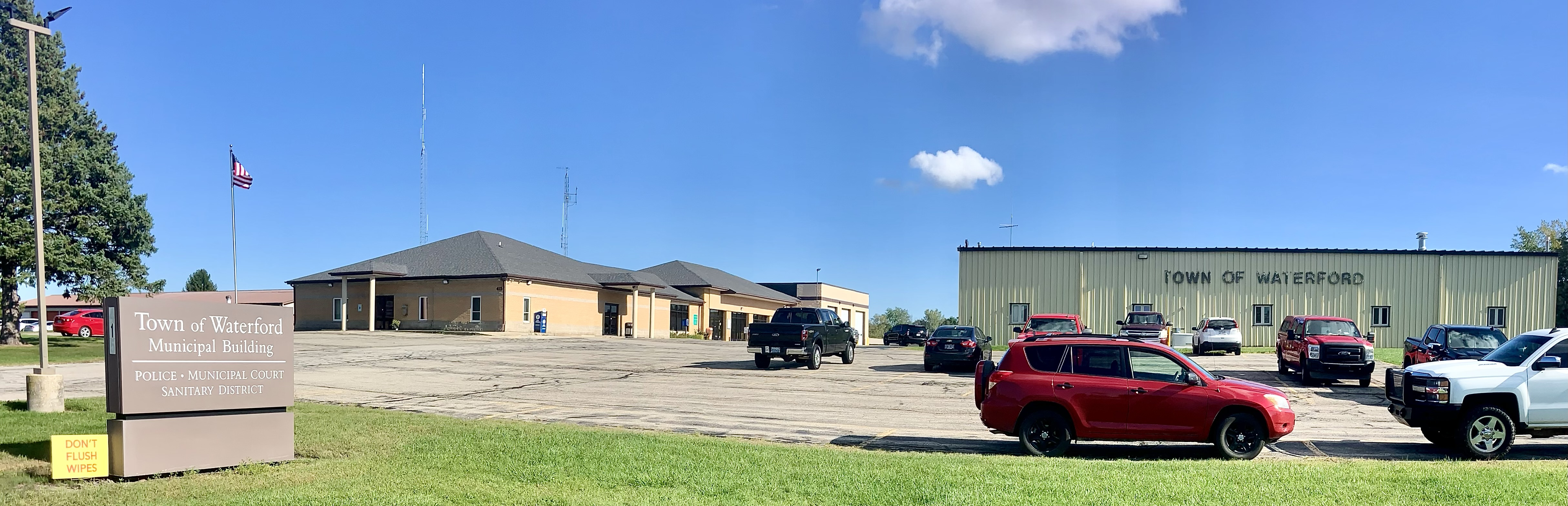
- Waterford Town Hall

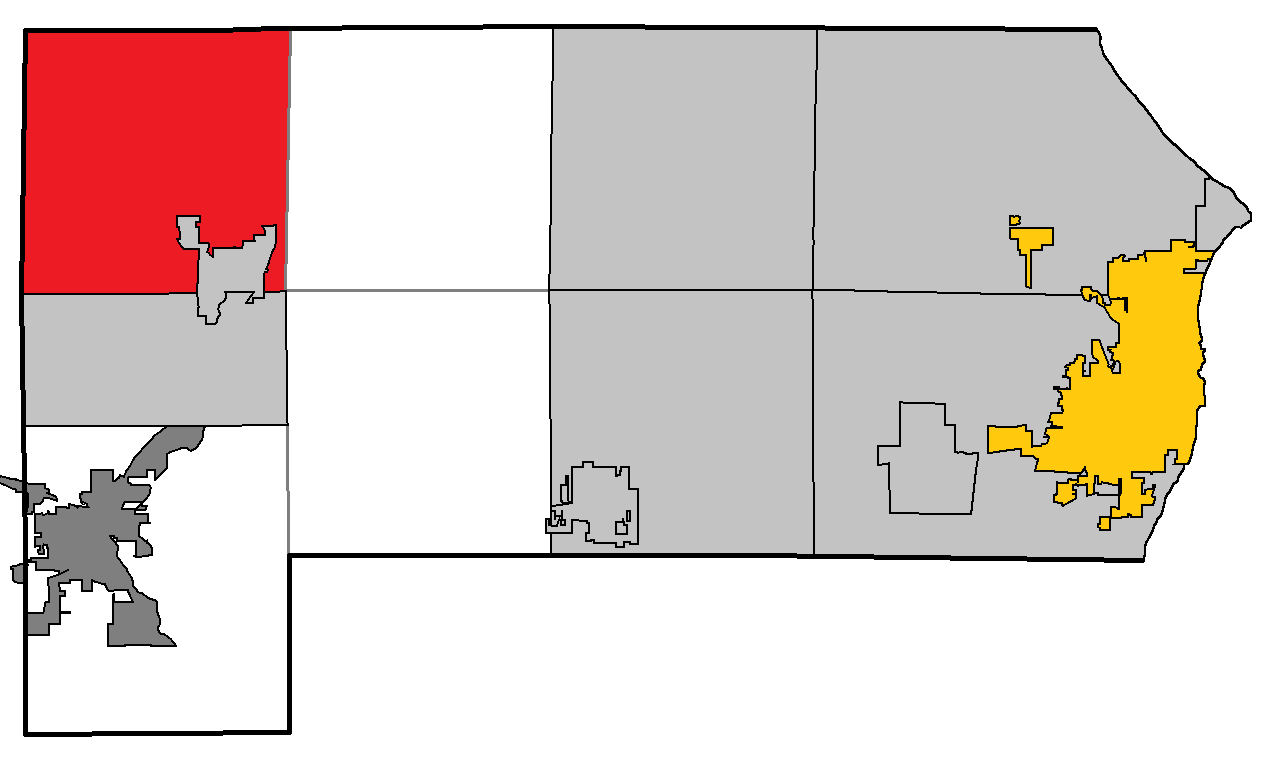
- Location of Waterford, within Racine County

- Location within Wisconsin Location within the United States
- Coordinates: 42°47′59″N 88°14′9″W
- Country: United States
- State: Wisconsin
- County: Racine
- Established: 1906

Area
  - Total: 33.57 sq mi (86.9 km^{2})
  - Land: 31.42 sq mi (81.4 km^{2})
  - Water: 2.15 sq mi (5.6 km^{2})
- Elevation: 827 ft (252 m)

Population (2020)
  - Total: 6,514
  - Density: 207.3/sq mi (80.05/km^{2})
- Time zone: UTC-6 (Central (CST))
  - Summer (DST): UTC-5 (CDT)
- ZIP Code: 53185
- Area code: 262
- FIPS code: 55-83850
- GNIS feature ID: 1584361
- Website: www.tn.waterford.wi.gov

The Town of Waterford is a town in Racine County, Wisconsin, United States. The population was 6,514 at the 2020 census. The Village of Waterford is partly within the town. The unincorporated communities of Buena Park, Caldwell, and Tichigan are in the town.

== Geography ==
According to the United States Census Bureau, the town has an area of 33.5 square miles (86.7 km^{2}), of which 31.5 square miles (81.7 km^{2}) is land and 2.0 square miles (5.1 km^{2} ,5.82%) is water.

== Demographics ==
As of the census of 2000, there were 5,938 people, 2,086 households, and 1,689 families residing in the town. The population density was 188.3 people per square mile (72.7/km^{2}). There were 2,263 housing units at an average density of 71.8 per square mile (27.7/km^{2}). The racial makeup of the town was 98.50% White, 0.40% Black or African American, 0.12% Native American, 0.22% Asian, 0.02% Pacific Islander, 0.17% from other races, and 0.57% from two or more races. 1.43% of the population were Hispanic or Latino of any race.

There were 2,086 households, out of which 40.6% had children under the age of 18 living with them, 71.3% were married couples living together, 4.8% had a female householder with no husband present, and 19.0% were non-families. 13.8% of all households were made up of individuals, and 4.1% had someone living alone who was 65 years of age or older. The average household size was 2.85 and the average family size was 3.15.

In the town, the population was spread out, with 28.5% under the age of 18, 5.9% from 18 to 24, 33.6% from 25 to 44, 24.4% from 45 to 64, and 7.6% who were 65 years of age or older. The median age was 37 years. For every 100 females, there were 108.4 males. For every 100 females age 18 and over, there were 104.3 males.

The median income for a household in the town was $66,599, and the median income for a family was $68,169. Males had a median income of $46,828 versus $30,890 for females. The per capita income for the town was $24,406. About 0.8% of families and 1.8% of the population were below the poverty line, including 0.6% of those under age 18 and 4.1% of those age 65 or over.
