= Meadow, South Dakota =

- unincorporated community
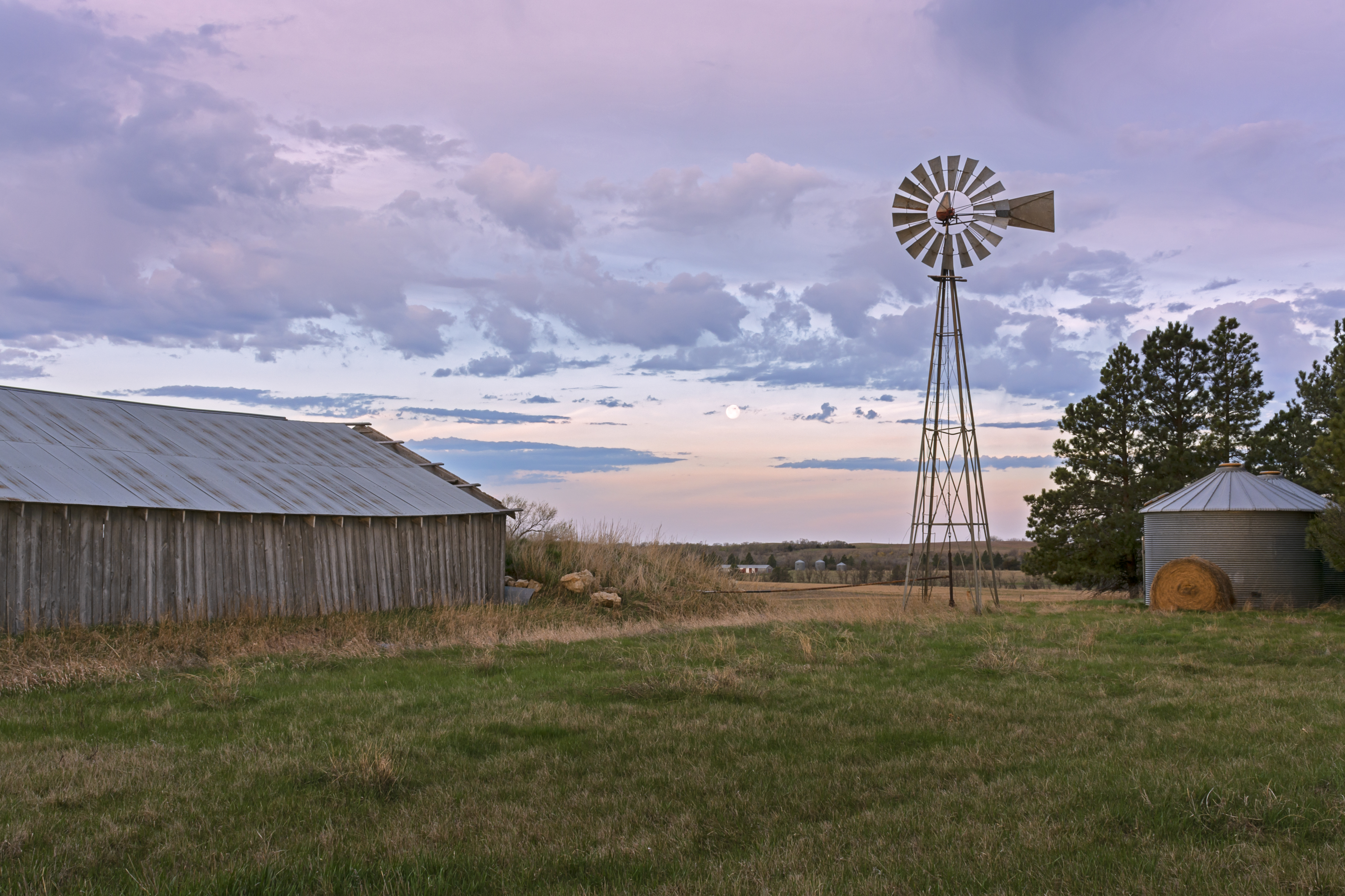
- Rural buildings and windmill in Meadow Township

- Location in South Dakota Location in the United States
- Coordinates: 45°31′45″N 102°12′59″W
- Country: United States
- State: South Dakota
- County: Perkins

Area
  - Total: 35.8 sq mi (92.8 km^{2})
  - Land: 35.6 sq mi (92.1 km^{2})
  - Water: 0.27 sq mi (0.7 km^{2})
- Elevation: 2,635 ft (803 m)

Population (2000)
  - Total: 35
  - Density: 1.0/sq mi (0.4/km^{2})
- Time zone: UTC-7 (Mountain (MST))
  - Summer (DST): UTC-6 (MDT)
- ZIP code: 57644
- Area code: 605
- FIPS code: 46-41660
- GNIS feature ID: 1256408

Meadow is an unincorporated community in Perkins County, South Dakota, United States. Meadow is twelve miles east of Bison and two miles from the junction of South Dakota Highways 20 and 73.

Meadow was laid out in 1907, and named for a vast meadow near the original town site.

Meadow is located approximately 15.5 miles to the west from what was the farthest point from any McDonald's restaurant in the contiguous United States in 2009, prior to that point moving 45.45955°N 101.91356°W. Along with Glad Valley, South Dakota, Meadow is one of the nearest communities to that point.
