= Simla, Colorado =

Town in Elbert County, Colorado, United States

- Town
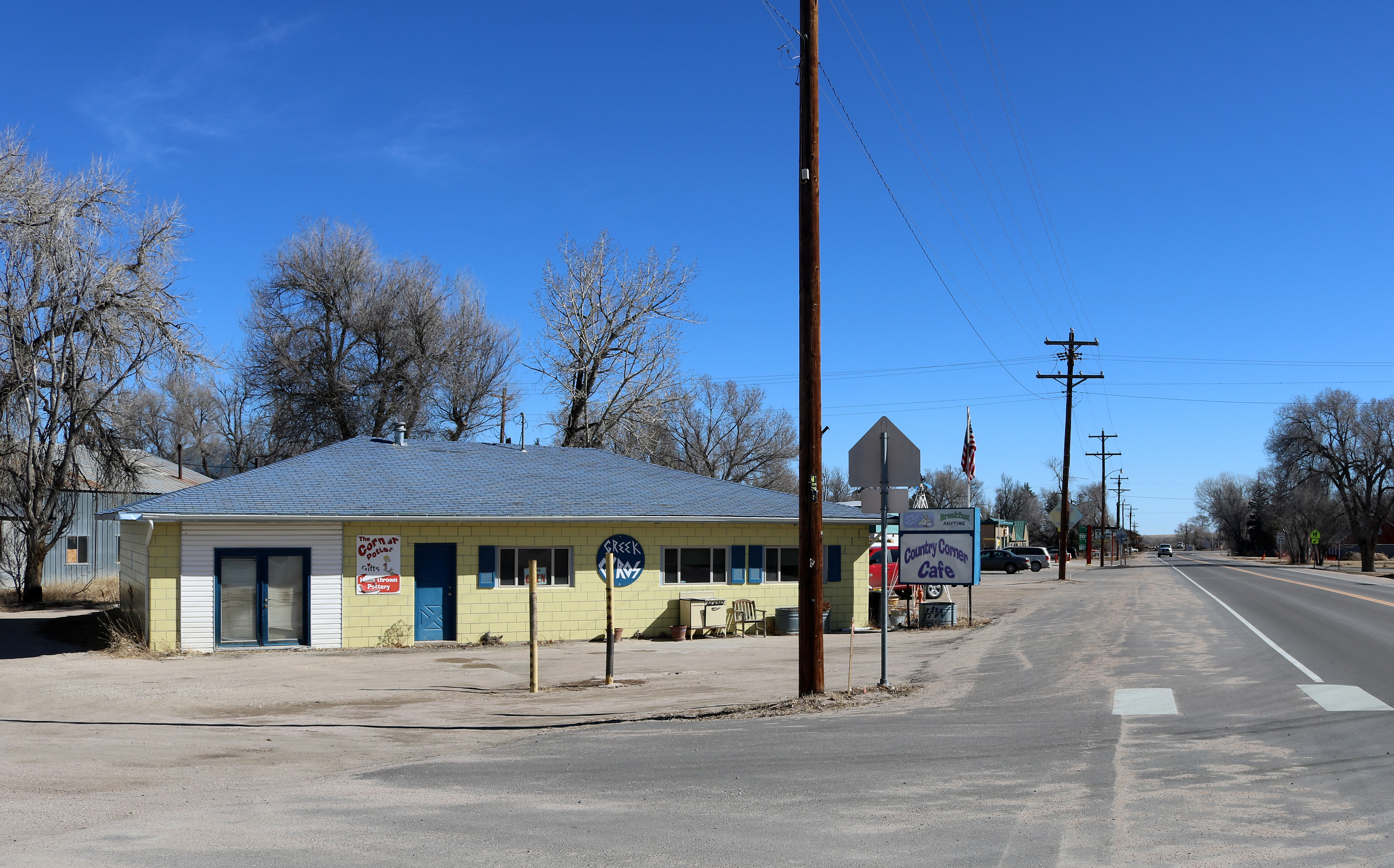
- Looking east along Highway 24 in Simla.

- Location of Simla in Elbert County, Colorado.
- Coordinates: 39°8′27″N 104°4′58″W
- Country: United States
- State: Colorado
- County: Elbert County
- Incorporated: January 15, 1912

Government
  - Type: Statutory Town

Area
  - Total: 0.62 sq mi (1.60 km^{2})
  - Land: 0.62 sq mi (1.60 km^{2})
  - Water: 0 sq mi (0.00 km^{2})
- Elevation: 5,978 ft (1,822 m)

Population (2020)
  - Total: 601
  - Density: 972.9/sq mi (375.63/km^{2})
- Time zone: UTC-7 (MST)
  - Summer (DST): UTC-6 (MDT)
- ZIP code: 80835
- Area code: 719
- GNIS feature ID: 2413290
- FIPS code: 08-70635
- Website: townofsimla.com

Simla is a statutory town in Elbert County, Colorado, United States. It is 48 miles (77 km) northeast of Colorado Springs. The population was 601 at the time of the 2020 United States census.

== History ==
Simla was founded in 1909 by a man with the name of Altman. Simla was named because the daughter of a railroad official was reading a book about India when she came across the name, Simla. Settled in the 1880s, Simla was incorporated in 1912. The first newspaper was started in 1911. It was a center for the shipping of the area's potato harvest each year.

Simla received national attention when it became the place where the first so-called "English Variant" of SARS-COV-2 (Covid-19 virus) was diagnosed in the United States.

== Geography ==
Simla is located in southern Elbert County to the south of Big Sandy Creek, an east-flowing tributary of the Arkansas River. U.S. Route 24 passes through the town, leading southwest to Colorado Springs and northeast 24 miles (39 km) to Limon.

According to the United States Census Bureau, Simla has a total area of 0.54 square miles (1.4 km^{2}), all of it land.

== Demographics ==
Historical population
Census	Pop.	Note	%±
1920	387		—
1930	351		−9.3%
1940	421		19.9%
1950	424		0.7%
1960	450		6.1%
1970	460		2.2%
1980	494		7.4%
1990	481		−2.6%
2000	663		37.8%
2010	618		−6.8%
2020	601		−2.8%
U.S. Decennial Census

As of the census of 2000, there were 663 people, 233 households, and 171 families residing in the town. The population density was 1,222.3 inhabitants per square mile (471.9/km^{2}). There were 261 housing units at an average density of 481.2 per square mile (185.8/km^{2}). The racial makeup of the town was 94.27% White, 0.45% African American, 1.96% Native American, 0.30% Asian, 1.21% from other races, and 1.81% from two or more races. Hispanic or Latino of any race were 3.62% of the population.

There were 233 households, out of which 40.3% had children under the age of 18 living with them, 56.7% were married couples living together, 13.3% had a female householder with no husband present, and 26.2% were non-families. 21.5% of all households were made up of individuals, and 10.7% had someone living alone who was 65 years of age or older. The average household size was 2.73 and the average family size was 3.24.

In the town, the population was spread out, with 32.4% under the age of 18, 7.7% from 18 to 24, 28.1% from 25 to 44, 16.4% from 45 to 64, and 15.4% who were 65 years of age or older. The median age was 34 years. For every 100 females, there were 93.3 males. For every 100 females age 18 and over, there were 87.4 males.

The median income for a household in the town was $31,382, and the median income for a family was $31,953. Males had a median income of $28,250 versus $21,458 for females. The per capita income for the town was $13,099. About 10.3% of families and 17.2% of the population were below the poverty line, including 26.0% of those under age 18 and 4.6% of those age 65 or over.

== Education ==
It is in the Big Sandy School District 100J.

Big Sandy High School in Simla has a tradition of athletic success. The Simla Cubs have won 11 team state championships: 5 football, 2 boys basketball, two girls basketball, two girls volleyball, and one boys track and field, as well as several individual state champions.

== Notable residents ==
Notable athletes from Simla include Glenn Morris, gold medal winner of the 1936 Olympic decathlon, as well as Barry Helton, former professional football player in the NFL.

== See also ==
- List of municipalities in Colorado
