= Ramah, Colorado =

Town in Colorado, US

- Town
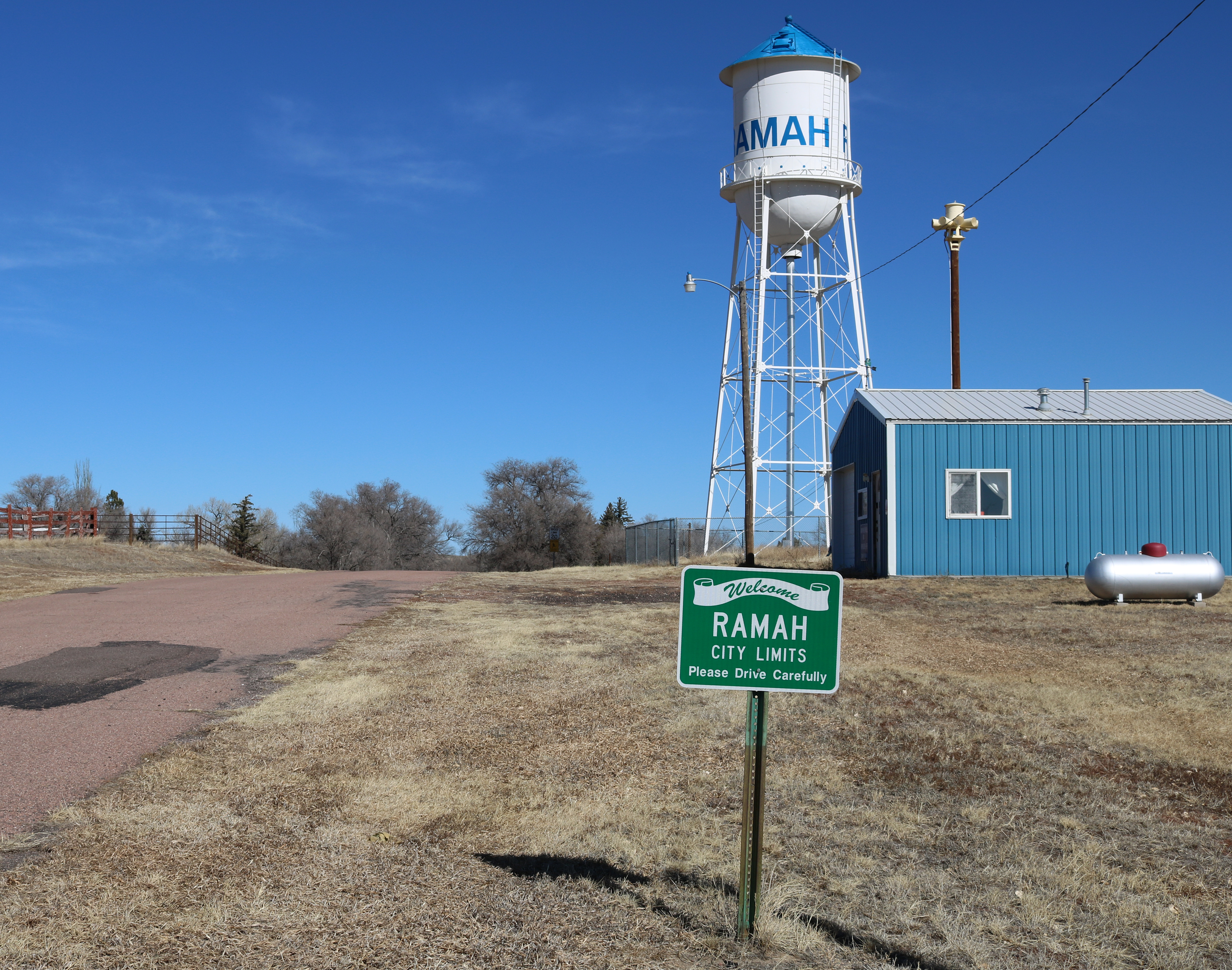
- Entering Ramah on Commercial Street, February 2018

- Location of Ramah in El Paso County, Colorado.
- Coordinates: 39°07′24″N 104°10′05″W
- Country: United States
- State: Colorado
- County: El Paso
- Incorporated (town): July 18, 1927

Government
  - Type: Statutory Town

Area
  - Total: 0.25 sq mi (0.64 km^{2})
  - Land: 0.25 sq mi (0.64 km^{2})
  - Water: 0 sq mi (0.00 km^{2})
- Elevation: 6,099 ft (1,859 m)

Population (2020)
  - Total: 111
  - Density: 450/sq mi (170/km^{2})
- Time zone: UTC-7 (Mountain (MST))
  - Summer (DST): UTC-6 (MDT)
- ZIP code: 80832
- Area code: 719
- GNIS feature ID: 2412523
- FIPS code: 08-62660
- Website: ramah.colorado.gov

Ramah (/ˈreɪmə/ RAY-mə) is a statutory town in El Paso County, Colorado, United States. The population was 111 as of the 2020 census. According to tradition, the name is derived from India.

== History ==
The area was first settled in a place called Old Zounds, which was 27 miles southeast of Kiowa. The post office, called O.Z. because the applicant just used the initials, existed until at least 1881. The post office was moved from Old Zounds to nearby Ramah in 1889.

Ramah began as a small railroading town along the Rock Island Railroad in the late 1800s. It was incorporated on July 18, 1927. During its peak, it was home to several hundred residents. Eventually, by the mid-1900s, the railroad was shut down, and Ramah suffered, since the railroad connected it to Colorado Springs, forty miles to the southwest. Despite its decline, Ramah continues to exist, with ranching as the mainstay of its economy.

== Geography ==
According to the United States Census Bureau, the town has a total area of 0.2 square miles (0.52 km^{2}), all of it land.

== Demographics ==
Historical population
Census	Pop.	Note	%±
1930	171		—
1940	186		8.8%
1950	142		−23.7%
1960	109		−23.2%
1970	101		−7.3%
1980	119		17.8%
1990	94		−21.0%
2000	117		24.5%
2010	123		5.1%
2020	111		−9.8%
U.S. Decennial Census

Ramah is located within the Colorado Springs, CO Metropolitan Statistical Area.
