= Caldwell, Wisconsin =

- Unincorporated community
- Location within Wisconsin Location within the United States
- Coordinates: 42°50′07″N 88°16′35″W
- Country: United States
- State: Wisconsin
- County: Racine
- Elevation: 846 ft (258 m)
- Time zone: UTC-6 (Central (CST))
  - Summer (DST): UTC-5 (CDT)
- Zip: 53106
- Area code: 262
- GNIS feature ID: 1562509

Caldwell is an unincorporated community located in the town of Waterford, Racine County, Wisconsin, United States. It is located at the intersections of County Highways L and O, 3.3 miles southeast of Mukwonago. The community was named for settlers Joseph and Tyler Caldwell, two brothers from Vermont who arrived in the area circa 1836.
