= Flaming Gorge, Utah =

Flaming Gorge
- CDP
- Location within Daggett County and the State of Utah

- Location of Utah in the United States
- Coordinates: 40°53′21″N 109°28′33″W
- Country: United States
- State: Utah
- County: Daggett
- Named for: Flaming Gorge National Recreation Area

Area
  - Total: 2.289 sq mi (5.93 km^{2})
  - Land: 2.281 sq mi (5.91 km^{2})
  - Water: 0.008 sq mi (0.021 km^{2})
- Elevation: 6,919 ft (2,109 m)

Population (2020)
  - Total: 72
  - Density: 32/sq mi (12/km^{2})
- Time zone: UTC−7 (Mountain (MST))
  - Summer (DST): UTC−6 (MDT)
- Area code: 435
- GNIS feature ID: 2584767

Flaming Gorge is a census-designated place in Daggett County, Utah, United States. The population was 72 at the 2020 census.

== Demographics ==
Historical population
Census	Pop.	Note	%±
2010	83		—
2020	72		−13.3%

As of the census of 2010, there were 83 people living in the CDP. There were 109 housing units. The racial makeup of the CDP was 97.6% White, 1.2% from some other race, and 1.2% from two or more races. Hispanic or Latino of any race were 4.8% of the population.

== Geography ==
The CDP is located in the Flaming Gorge National Recreation Area, south of Flaming Gorge Reservoir and north of Greendale Junction.

=== Climate ===
According to the Köppen Climate Classification system, Flaming Gorge has a warm-summer humid continental climate, abbreviated "Dfb" on climate maps. The hottest temperature recorded in Flaming Gorge was 102 °F (38.9 °C) on July 14, 2002, while the coldest temperature recorded was −38 °F (−38.9 °C) on January 12, 1963.

Climate data for Flaming Gorge, Utah, 1991–2020 normals, extremes 1957–present
Month	Jan	Feb	Mar	Apr	May	Jun	Jul	Aug	Sep	Oct	Nov	Dec	Year
Record high °F (°C)	60 (16)	66 (19)	76 (24)	82 (28)	93 (34)	100 (38)	102 (39)	99 (37)	99 (37)	84 (29)	75 (24)	64 (18)	102 (39)
Mean maximum °F (°C)	50.0 (10.0)	54.3 (12.4)	65.3 (18.5)	73.1 (22.8)	82.3 (27.9)	91.4 (33.0)	95.7 (35.4)	93.8 (34.3)	87.6 (30.9)	77.4 (25.2)	62.6 (17.0)	52.9 (11.6)	96.2 (35.7)
Mean daily maximum °F (°C)	36.6 (2.6)	39.8 (4.3)	49.6 (9.8)	56.7 (13.7)	67.1 (19.5)	79.2 (26.2)	86.8 (30.4)	84.4 (29.1)	75.4 (24.1)	61.5 (16.4)	46.4 (8.0)	36.4 (2.4)	60.0 (15.5)
Daily mean °F (°C)	24.8 (−4.0)	27.5 (−2.5)	36.8 (2.7)	43.6 (6.4)	52.6 (11.4)	62.3 (16.8)	69.6 (20.9)	68.0 (20.0)	59.0 (15.0)	46.7 (8.2)	34.3 (1.3)	24.9 (−3.9)	45.8 (7.7)
Mean daily minimum °F (°C)	13.0 (−10.6)	15.1 (−9.4)	24.0 (−4.4)	30.4 (−0.9)	38.1 (3.4)	45.5 (7.5)	52.4 (11.3)	51.7 (10.9)	42.6 (5.9)	32.0 (0.0)	22.1 (−5.5)	13.4 (−10.3)	31.7 (−0.2)
Mean minimum °F (°C)	−7.4 (−21.9)	−8.3 (−22.4)	4.3 (−15.4)	14.1 (−9.9)	23.5 (−4.7)	32.2 (0.1)	41.3 (5.2)	39.8 (4.3)	27.6 (−2.4)	14.6 (−9.7)	1.1 (−17.2)	−7.2 (−21.8)	−14.3 (−25.7)
Record low °F (°C)	−38 (−39)	−31 (−35)	−14 (−26)	−1 (−18)	14 (−10)	22 (−6)	30 (−1)	26 (−3)	11 (−12)	−4 (−20)	−17 (−27)	−36 (−38)	−38 (−39)
Average precipitation inches (mm)	0.49 (12)	0.66 (17)	0.89 (23)	1.10 (28)	1.35 (34)	0.94 (24)	1.04 (26)	1.19 (30)	1.67 (42)	1.37 (35)	0.52 (13)	0.54 (14)	11.76 (298)
Average snowfall inches (cm)	8.1 (21)	8.6 (22)	6.6 (17)	3.6 (9.1)	0.6 (1.5)	0.0 (0.0)	0.0 (0.0)	0.0 (0.0)	0.1 (0.25)	2.4 (6.1)	6.3 (16)	7.4 (19)	43.7 (111.95)
Average extreme snow depth inches (cm)	6.1 (15)	7.3 (19)	4.2 (11)	1.7 (4.3)	0.5 (1.3)	0.0 (0.0)	0.0 (0.0)	0.0 (0.0)	0.0 (0.0)	1.8 (4.6)	3.1 (7.9)	4.7 (12)	9.7 (25)
Average precipitation days (≥ 0.01 in)	4.0	4.2	5.7	6.2	6.6	5.3	5.3	6.4	5.6	5.3	4.0	4.2	62.8
Average snowy days (≥ 0.1 in)	3.6	3.3	2.9	1.6	0.2	0.0	0.0	0.0	0.1	1.0	2.7	3.4	18.8
Source 1: NOAA
Source 2: National Weather Service

== See also ==
- List of census-designated places in Utah
