= Glad Valley, South Dakota =

- Unincorporated community
- Location within South Dakota
- Coordinates: 45°23′57″N 101°46′40″W
- Country: United States
- State: South Dakota
- County: Ziebach
- Elevation: 2,464 ft (751 m)
- Time zone: UTC-6 (Central (CST))
  - Summer (DST): UTC-5
- Area code: 605
- GNIS feature ID: 1255253

Glad Valley is an unincorporated community in Ziebach County, South Dakota, United States. Glad Valley is located on South Dakota Highway 20, 17 miles (27 km) west of Isabel.

Glad Valley was laid out in 1926, and named for the nearby Glad Valley Ranch.
