= Wisconsin's Racine County 2nd Assembly district =

Former American legislative district

Wisconsin's Racine County 2nd State Assembly district
- Obsolete
- Notes: 1848–1888; 1892–1972

Wisconsin's Racine County 2nd Assembly district was a district in the Wisconsin State Assembly for most of the history of the state of Wisconsin, up to the legislative redistricting reforms of 1972 which created the current numbered districts. Located in southeast Wisconsin, the district was one of the 66 original Assembly districts defined in Article XIV of the Constitution of Wisconsin. The Constitution originally allocated five districts for Racine County—which at that time also comprised all of what is now Kenosha County; this district originally comprised central parts of Racine County.

The district was in use for 120 of the first 124 years of Wisconsin's history, from 1848 to 1888, then again from 1892 to 1972. In its later configurations, this district comprised parts of the city of Racine.

== List of representatives ==
List of representatives from the Racine County 2nd district
Member	Party	Residence	Term start	Term end	Leg.
District created
Henry B. Roberts	Dem.	Caledonia	June 5, 1848	January 1, 1849	1st
James DeNoon Reymert	F.S.	Norway	January 1, 1849	January 7, 1850	2nd
Stephen O. Bennett	F.S.	Raymond	January 7, 1850	January 6, 1851	3rd
Peter Van Vliet	F.S.	Caledonia	January 6, 1851	January 5, 1852	4th
Abram Gordon	Whig	Racine	January 5, 1852	January 3, 1853	5th
William H. Roe	Dem.	Mount Pleasant	January 3, 1853	January 2, 1854	6th
John Smith	Dem.	Caledonia	January 2, 1854	January 1, 1855	7th
Alanson Filer	Rep.	Racine	January 1, 1855	January 7, 1856	8th
Eliphalet Cram	Dem.	Racine	January 7, 1856	January 5, 1857	9th
Peter Lutkin	Rep.	Whitesville	January 5, 1857	January 4, 1858	10th
George W. Selden	Rep.	Racine	January 4, 1858	January 3, 1859	11th
Leonard S. Van Vliet	Rep.	Caledonia	January 3, 1859	January 2, 1860	12th
Lewis L. Baldwin	Rep.	Racine	January 2, 1860	January 7, 1861	13th
Orlando C. Munroe	Rep.	Racine	January 7, 1861	January 6, 1862	14th
Thomas Butler	Dem.	Mount Pleasant	January 6, 1862	January 1, 1863	15th
Orlando C. Munroe	Rep.	Racine	January 1, 1863	January 4, 1864	16th
Henry Stevens	Union	Caledonia	January 4, 1864	January 2, 1865	17th
Elijah C. Salisbury	Union	Union Grove	January 2, 1865	January 1, 1866	18th
George Q. Erskine	Union	Racine	January 1, 1866	January 7, 1867	19th
Hiram D. Morse	Union	Waterford	January 7, 1867	January 6, 1868	20th
Hiram L. Gilmore	Rep.	North Cape	January 6, 1868	January 3, 1870	21st 22nd
Ira A. Rice	Rep.	Waterford	January 3, 1870	January 2, 1871	23rd
George Bremner	Ind.	Dover	January 2, 1871	January 1, 1872	24th
William Vail Moore	Rep.	Yorkville	January 1, 1872	January 6, 1873	25th
Richard Richards	Rep.	Mount Pleasant	January 6, 1873	January 5, 1874	26th
Elias White	Ref.	Burlington	January 5, 1874	January 1, 1877	27th 28th 29th
John T. Rice	Rep.	Waterford	January 1, 1877	January 7, 1878	30th
Patrick Cheves	Lib.R.	Norway	January 7, 1878	January 6, 1879	31st
Knud Adland	Rep.	North Cape	January 6, 1879	January 5, 1880	32nd
John Bosustow	Rep.	Yorkville	January 5, 1880	January 3, 1881	33rd
Sidney A. Sage	Rep.	Sturtevant	January 3, 1881	January 2, 1882	34th
Adam Apple	Dem.	Norway	January 2, 1882	January 7, 1889	35th 36th 37th 38th
District abolished by 1887 Wisconsin Act 461; Racine County was consolidated as a single-county Assembly district
District re-established by 1892 Wisconsin Special Session 2 Act 1
Francis Reuschlein	Dem.	Burlington	January 2, 1893	January 7, 1895	41st
George H. Blake	Rep.	Rochester	January 7, 1895	January 4, 1897	42nd
Thomas H. Mosher	Rep.	Raymond	January 4, 1897	January 2, 1899	43rd
George Ela	Rep.	Rochester	January 2, 1899	January 5, 1903	44th 45th
--Vacant--			January 5, 1903	February 18, 1903	46th
Edward F. Rakow	Dem.	Burlington	February 18, 1903	January 2, 1905	46th
John O. Thomas	Rep.	Caledonia	January 2, 1905	January 4, 1909	47th 48th
John H. Kamper	Rep.	Raymond	January 4, 1909	January 6, 1913	49th 50th
Joseph C. Hamata	Dem.	Racine	January 6, 1913	January 4, 1915	51st
Henry Herzog	Dem.	Mount Pleasant	January 4, 1915	January 1, 1917	52nd
P. Walter Petersen	Rep.	Racine	January 1, 1917	January 6, 1919	53rd
Henry F. Johnson	Rep.	Norway	January 6, 1919	January 1, 1923	54th 55th
Jacob Stoffel Jr.	Rep.	Racine	January 1, 1923	January 5, 1925	56th
Edward F. Hilker	Rep.	Racine	January 5, 1925	January 2, 1933	57th 58th 59th 60th
Joseph C. Hamata	Dem.	Racine	January 2, 1933	January 4, 1937	61st 62nd
Jack Harvey	Prog.	Racine	January 4, 1937	January 6, 1941	63rd 64th
Edward F. Hilker	Rep.	Racine	January 6, 1941	January 4, 1943	65th
Willis Frazell	Rep.	Racine	January 4, 1943	January 6, 1947	66th 67th
Wallace E. Nield	Rep.	Racine	January 6, 1947	January 3, 1949	68th
Thomas Cole Taylor	Dem.	Racine	January 3, 1949	January 1, 1951	69th
Lawrence R. Larsen	Rep.	Racine	January 1, 1951	January 3, 1955	70th 71st
Roy E. Naleid	Dem.	Racine	January 3, 1955	January 4, 1965	72nd 73rd 74th 75th 76th
Manny S. Brown	Dem.	Racine	January 4, 1965	January 1, 1973	77th 78th 79th 80th
District abolished by 1971 Wisconsin Act 304; Racine County was divided between the 43rd, 61st, 62nd, 63rd, and 66th Assembly districts The Racine County 2nd district was roughly replaced by the 61st Assembly district
