= Adam Apple =

German American politician (1831–1905)

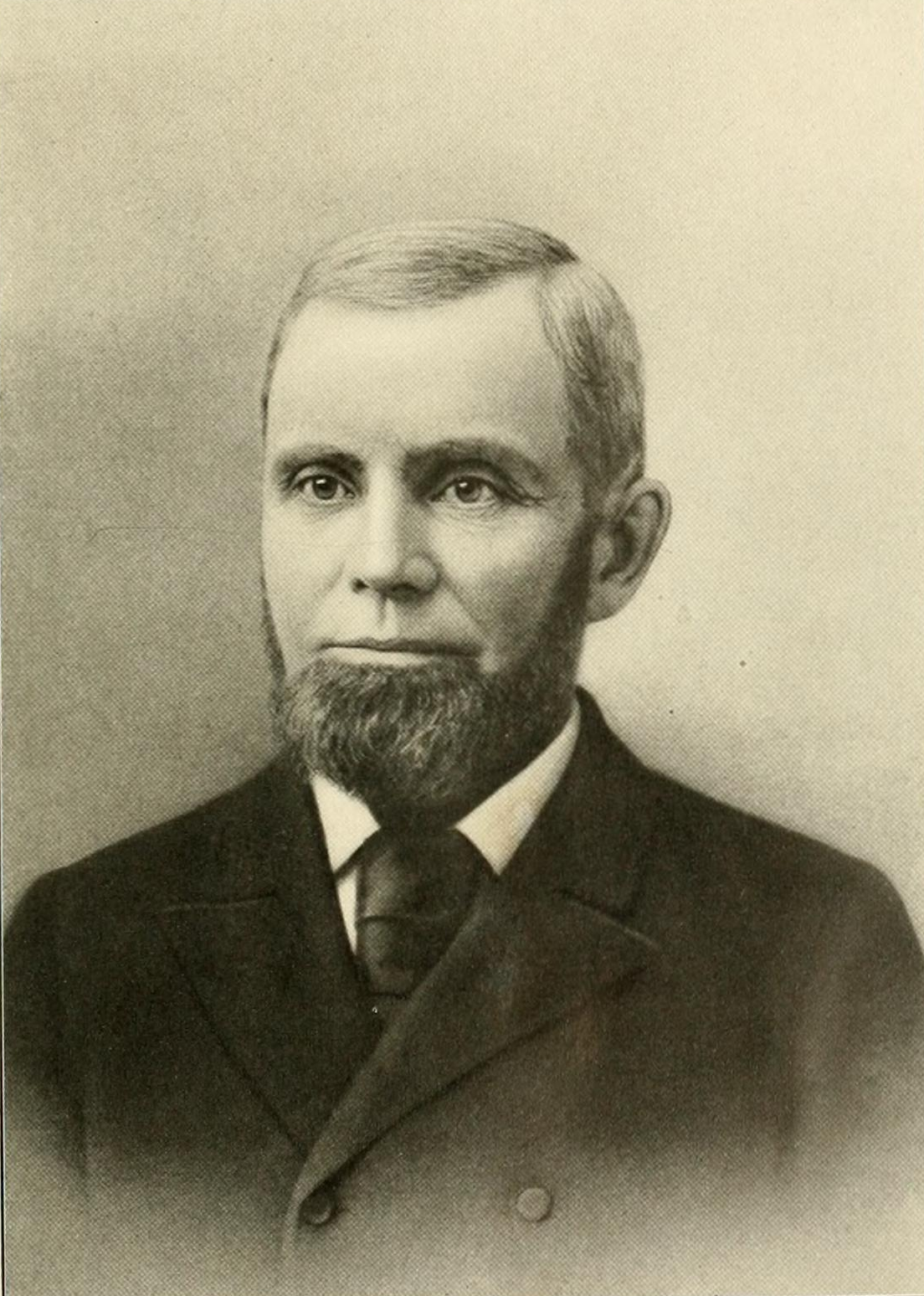

Member of the Wisconsin Senate from the 3rd district
- In office January 5, 1891 – January 7, 1895
- Preceded by: Henry Allen Cooper
- Succeeded by: Ernst Timme

Member of the Wisconsin State Assembly from the Racine 2nd district
- In office January 2, 1882 – January 7, 1889
- Preceded by: Sidney A. Sage
- Succeeded by: Alfred L. Buchan (entire county)

Personal details
- Born: November 27, 1831 Rhenish Palatinate, Bavaria
- Died: April 19, 1905 (aged 73) North Cape, Wisconsin, U.S.
- Resting place: North Cape Lutheran Cemetery; North Cape, Wisconsin
- Party: Democratic
- Spouse: Dorothea Eckel (m. 1856; died 1913)
- Children: 8

Adam Apple (November 27, 1831 – April 19, 1905) was a German American immigrant, farmer, carpenter, and Democratic politician from Racine County, Wisconsin. He represented Racine County for four years in the Wisconsin Senate (1891–1895) and for seven years in the state Assembly (1882–1889).

== Biography ==
Apple was born in the Palatinate Region in the Kingdom of Bavaria. He was the eldest of five sons born to Adam and Barbara Beecher Apple. He was raised and worked on his father's farm and was educated in German common schools until age 17, when he set out on his own to emigrate to the United States.

He traveled to Rotterdam, in the Netherlands, and sailed from there to New York City, finally settling in Philadelphia, where he worked as an apprentice cabinetmaker. At the end of his three-year apprenticeship, rather than continuing in that vocation, he set out west to California, following the call of the Gold Rush. After three years mining gold, he returned to Philadelphia, intent on investing his earnings and returning to his cabinetry.

Within a year, however, Apple was again drawn to the west and this time moved to the new state of Wisconsin. He settled in the town of Norway, in Racine County, and purchased 120 acres of land. He worked at cultivating the land but soon purchased additional acres, bringing his total estate to nearly 340 acres within a few years. He became renowned in local farming for his cultivation of tobacco.

Apple was a life-long member of the Democratic Party, since his early years in the United States, having cast his first vote for Franklin Pierce in 1852. He was elected chairman of the Norway Town Board in the 1870s and served in that role for eight years, and was clerk of the local school board for eighteen years. In 1881 he was elected to the Wisconsin State Assembly for Racine County's rural 2nd assembly district, earning re-election in 1882, 1884, and 1886. An 1887 redistricting act reduced the county of Racine from two assembly districts to one, thus eliminating Apple's seat. Apple ran instead, in 1890, for the Wisconsin State Senate in the district encompassing Racine and Kenosha counties, winning a narrow victory in a part of the state that—at the time—generally provided a Republican majority.

Apple worked on his farm until age 70, when he began leasing the land to his sons, Charles and Harry. He removed to the neighboring community of North Cape, where he remained until his death in 1905. Apple had been in declining health for several months and underwent an operation in Milwaukee in the weeks before his death.

== Personal life and family ==
Adam Apple married Dorothea (Dorothy) Eckel in 1856. Dorothy was also a German American immigrant who had been brought to the United States by her parents at age 7. They had eight children together—four sons and four daughters:

- Ellen C. (Ella), who married Charles Blakey of Estherville, Iowa,
- Adam Jr., who died at age 28,
- Josephine, who married Daniel M. Clump of Monmouth, Iowa,
- Anna (Annie), a teacher in Mitchellville, Iowa,
- Andrew J., living in Chicago,
- Charles E. and Harold (Harry), who remained in Norway and took over their father's farms,
- and Florence (Flora), the twin of Harry

Apple was a devoted Lutheran, a Mason, and a member of the Independent Order of Odd Fellows.

== Electoral history ==
=== Wisconsin Senate (1890) ===
Wisconsin Senate, 3rd District Election, 1890
Party	Candidate	Votes	%	±%
General Election, November 4, 1890
Democratic	Adam Apple	3,420	47.97%	+12.85%
Republican	John M. Driver	3,014	42.28%	−14.02%
Socialist Labor	William Paul	409	5.74%	
Prohibition	S. C. Johnson (Note: It is not clear if this is the famous Samuel Curtis Johnson who also lived in Racine at this time.)	286	4.01%	−4.57%
Plurality		406	5.70%	-15.48%
Total votes		7,129	100.0%	+20.38%
Democratic gain from Republican		Swing	26.87%	

== Notes ==
Wisconsin State Assembly
Preceded by Sidney A. Sage	Member of the Wisconsin State Assembly from the Racine 2nd district January 2, 1882 – January 7, 1889	Succeeded by Alfred L. Buchan (entire county)
Wisconsin Senate
Preceded by Henry Allen Cooper	Member of the Wisconsin Senate from the 3rd district January 5, 1891 – January 7, 1895	Succeeded by Ernst Timme
