= C89 =

C89 may refer to:

== Science and technology ==
- C89 (C version) or ANSI C, a C programming-language revision
- NGC 6087 (Caldwell catalogue: C89), an open cluster in the constellation Norma

== Other uses ==
- Ruy Lopez (ECO code: C60–C99), a chess opening
- Night Work (Women) Convention (Revised), 1948, an ILO convention
- Sylvania Airport (FAA LID), Wisconsin, US

== See also ==
- HMNZS Royalist (C89), a 1942 New Zealand Royal navy cruiser
- KNHC, a radio station in Seattle, Washington known as C89.5
