= Belle Kellogg Towne =

American author and journalist (1844–1923)

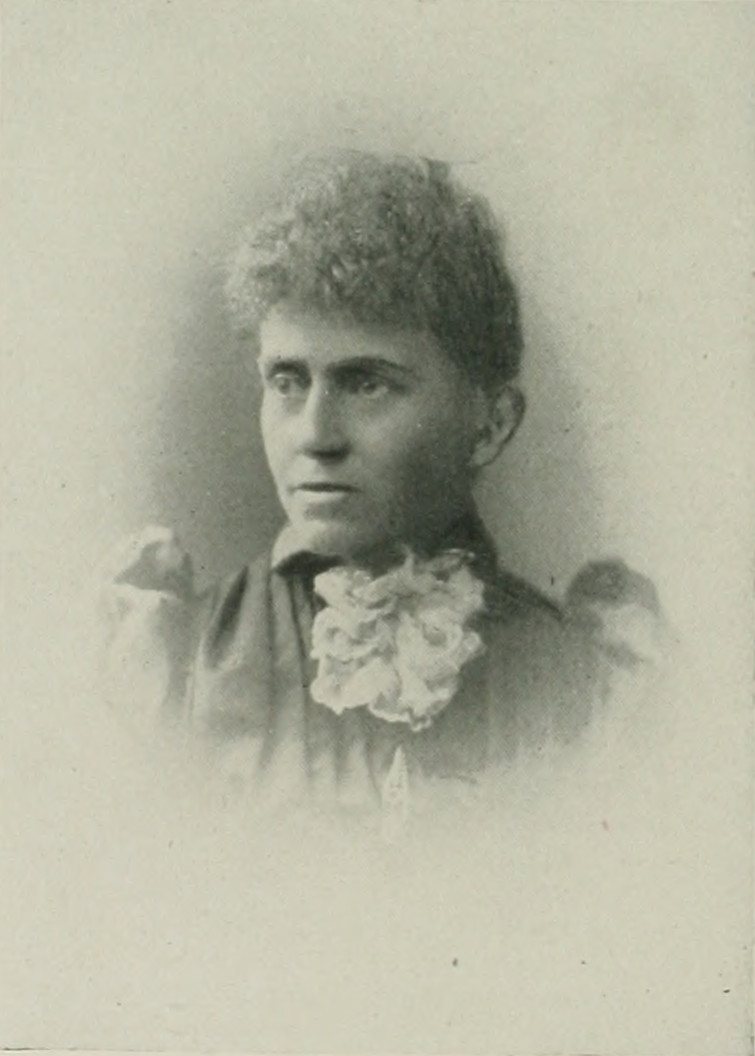
Portrait photo from A Woman of the Century

Isabella Electa Kellogg Towne (June 1, 1844 – November 4, 1923) was an author and journalist born in Sylvania, Wisconsin, United States. In the 1880s, Towne was hired to coordinate and organize young people's papers for the Young People's Weekly, published by the Chicago-based David C. Cook Publishing Company.

The Weekly was one of the most notable periodicals of religious papers for the young. Kellogg earned the reputation as being "one of America's first leading women in the literary and publishing fields".

== Personal life ==
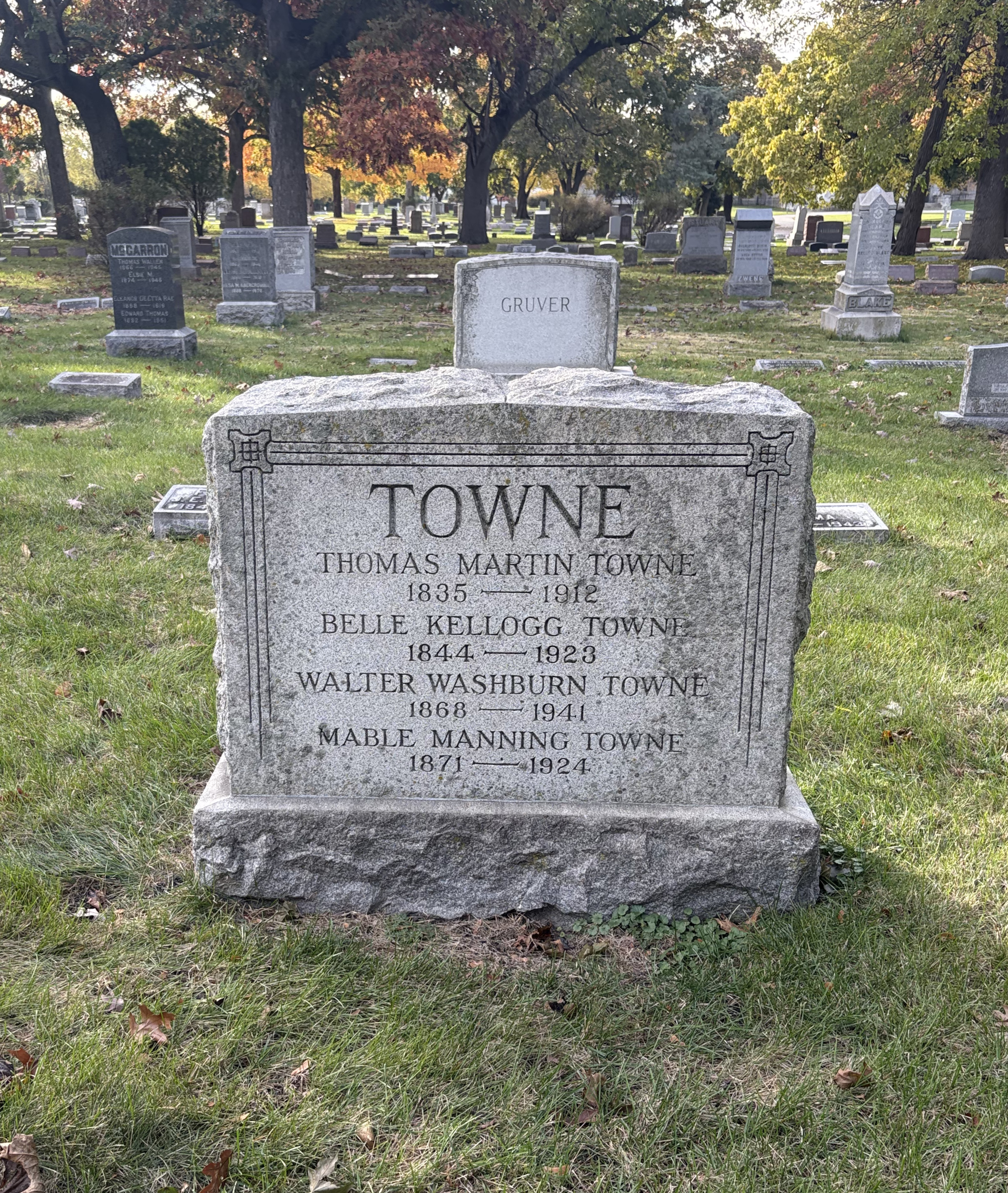
Towne's grave at Rosehill Cemetery

Belle Kellogg was born to Seth H. and Electa S. Kellogg. She married doctor, and musical composer Professor Thomas Martin Towne (1835-1912), of Chicago, Illinois. She died at her home in Chicago on November 4, 1923 and is buried with her husband and son, Walter Washburn Towne (1868-1941), at Rosehill Cemetery.

== Works ==
- Around the Ranch, D. Lothrop & Company, ©1883
- The Transformation of Job, and the Taking in of Martha Matilda, with Frederick Vining Fisher, Dodo Press, 2008, originally published in 1900
- On the Mountain Top, David C. Cook, 1904
- Snowflakes and Heartaches, David C. Cook Publishing Company, 1912
