= John H. Kamper =

20th century American politician

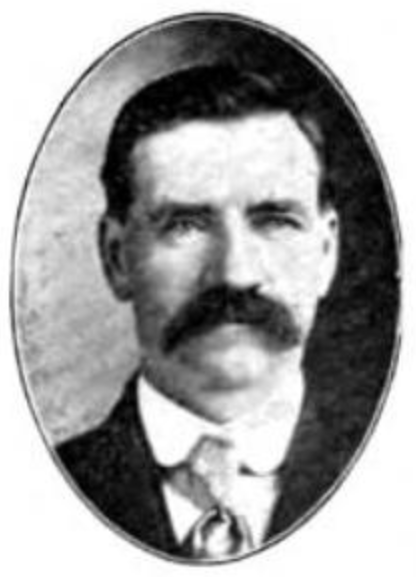

Member of the Wisconsin State Assembly
- In office January 1, 1923 – January 2, 1933
- Preceded by: District established
- Succeeded by: Edward F. Rakow
- Constituency: Racine 3rd district
- In office January 4, 1909 – January 6, 1913
- Preceded by: John O. Thomas
- Succeeded by: Joseph C. Hamata
- Constituency: Racine 2nd district

Personal details
- Born: December 17, 1857 Denmark
- Died: October 3, 1933 (aged 75) Raymond, Wisconsin, U.S.
- Resting place: North Cape Lutheran Cemetery, North Cape, Wisconsin
- Party: Republican
- Spouse: Ella Elizabeth Adland (m. 1885; died 1920)
- Children: Leslie Haddock Kamper^{(b. 1886; died 1962)}; Ray Stanley Kamper^{(b. 1891; died 1968)}; Lloyd Vincent Kamper^{(b. 1894; died 1979)}; Irwin Adland Kamper^{(b. 1899; died 1969)}
- Occupation: Farmer

John H. Kamper (December 17, 1857 – October 3, 1933) was a Danish American immigrant, farmer, and Republican politician from Racine County, Wisconsin. He was a member of the Wisconsin State Assembly for seven terms in the early 20th century.

== Biography ==
Kamper was born on December 17, 1857, in Denmark. He moved with his parents to Wisconsin in 1866, settling in Racine County.

He died at his home in Raymond on October 3, 1933.

== Career ==
Kamper was elected to the Assembly in 1908. In 1902, Kamper had been an unsuccessful candidate for the Assembly, losing to Edward F. Rakow after a tie vote. Additionally, he served as a Justice of the Peace, a town chairman (similar to Mayor) and Chairman of the Racine County Board of Supervisors. He was a Republican.

Wisconsin State Assembly
Preceded by John O. Thomas	Member of the Wisconsin State Assembly from the Racine 2nd district January 4, 1909 – January 6, 1913	Succeeded by Joseph C. Hamata
New district established	Member of the Wisconsin State Assembly from the Racine 3rd district January 4, 1909 – January 6, 1913	Succeeded by Edward F. Rakow
