= Elias White =

American politician

Elias Nelson White (June 26, 1826 – January 24, 1916) was an American farmer and produce dealer from Burlington, Wisconsin who spent three one-year terms (1874–1876) as a "People's Reform" member of the Wisconsin State Assembly.

== Background ==
White was born June 26, 1826, in Lyons, New York, where he received a common school education. He became a farmer and produce dealer; and moved from New York state to Waukegan, Illinois in 1852, and from there to Lyons in Walworth County, Wisconsin in 1860. He was postmaster in Lyons for four years before moving from Lyons to Burlington in 1868.

== Elective office ==
He served two years as chairman of the town board of Burlington, and on the Racine County, Wisconsin board of supervisors; and was twice elected chairman of the county board. He ran for the Assembly for the second Racine County district in 1871 as a Democrat, losing to Republican William Vail Moore with 970 votes to Moore's 1184. He was elected in 1873 as part of the "Reform" or "People's Reform" party, a coalition of Democrats, reform and Liberal Republicans, and Grangers, which secured the election of William Robert Taylor as Governor in 1873; with 1,106 votes, against 1,005 for Republican John Balloch (Republican incumbent Richard Richards was not a candidate for re-election). He was assigned to the standing committees on insurance, banks and banking; and on assessment and collection of taxes. He was re-elected in 1874 (1430 votes to 1199 for former Assemblyman Republican Hiram D. Morse) and again in 1875, receiving 1,054, against 1,003 for Republican Peter Meyers. He was not a candidate for re-election in 1876, and was succeeded by Republican John T. Rice.
