= Ives Grove, Wisconsin =

- Unincorporated community
- Location within Wisconsin Location within the United States
- Coordinates: 42°43′45″N 87°57′58″W
- Country: United States
- State: Wisconsin
- County: Racine
- Elevation: 791 ft (241 m)
- Time zone: UTC-6 (Central (CST))
  - Summer (DST): UTC-5 (CDT)
- Area code: 262
- GNIS feature ID: 1567050

Ives Grove is an unincorporated community located in the town of Yorkville, Racine County, Wisconsin, United States. The Ives Grove Golf Course and Country Club, the Racine Convention and Tourism Center, and Evans Park are all located nearby.
