= Sylvania Airport =

- IATA: none; ICAO: none; FAA LID: C89

Summary
- Airport type: Public
- Serves: Yorkville, Wisconsin
- Time zone: CST (UTC−06:00)
  - Summer (DST): CDT (UTC−05:00)
- Elevation AMSL: 788 ft (240 m)
- Coordinates: 42°42′12″N 087°57′32″W

Map
- Location of airport in Wisconsin C89 (the United States)

Runways
Direction	Length		Surface
Direction	ft	m	Surface
8R/26L	2,272	693	Asphalt
8L/26R	2,343	714	Turf

Statistics
- Aircraft operations (2022): 23,000
- Based aircraft (2024): 47
- Source: Federal Aviation Administration

Sylvania Airport (FAA LID: C89) is a privately owned public use airport located near Sylvania, an unincorporated community 3 miles (5 km) west of the central business district of the village of Sturtevant, in Racine County, Wisconsin, United States.

Although most airports in the United States use the same three-letter location identifier for the FAA and International Air Transport Association (IATA), this airport is assigned C89 by the FAA but has no designation from the IATA.

Skydive Midwest is based at the airport.

== Facilities and aircraft ==
Sylvania Airport covers an area of 34 acres (13 ha) at an elevation of 788 feet (240 m) above mean sea level. It has two runways: 8R/26L is 2,272 by 38 feet (693 x 12 m) with an asphalt surface and 8L/26R is 2,343 by 120 feet (714 x 37 m) with a turf surface.

For the 12-month period ending June 2, 2022, the airport had 23,000 aircraft operations, an average of 63 per day; all general aviation. In July 2024, there were 47 aircraft based at this airport: 43 single-engine, 3 multi-engine and 1 ultra-light.

== See also ==
- List of airports in Wisconsin
