= Wind Lake, Wisconsin =

Census-designated place in Wisconsin, United States

- CDP
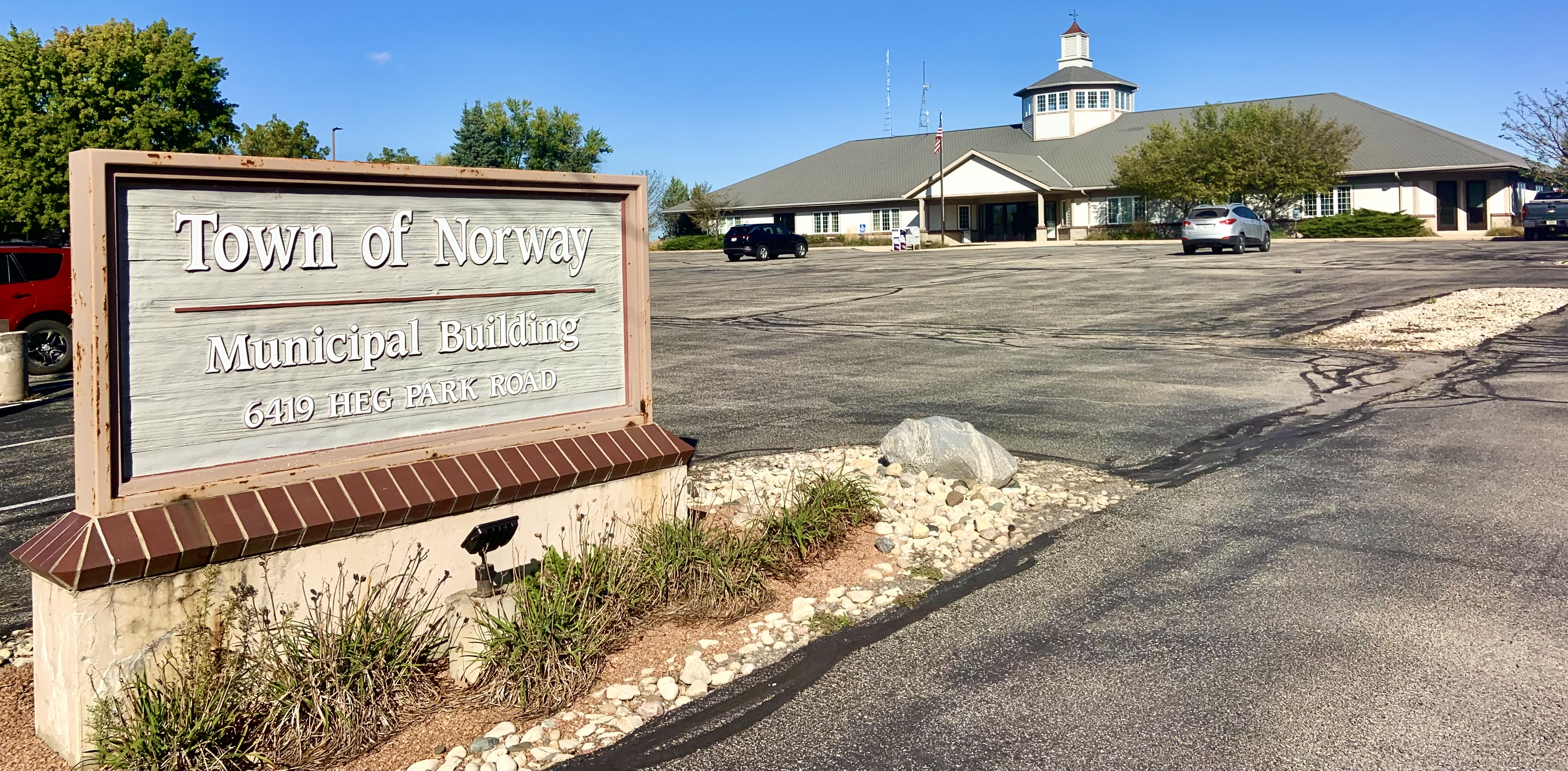
- Norway Town hall in Wind Lake

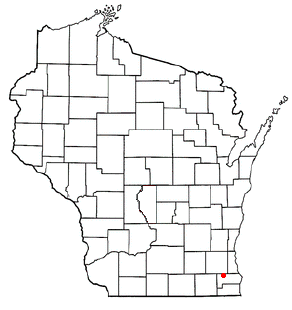
- Location of Wind Lake, Wisconsin
- Coordinates: 42°49′19″N 88°9′28″W
- Country: United States
- State: Wisconsin
- County: Racine

Area
  - Total: 7.259 sq mi (18.80 km^{2})
  - Land: 5.413 sq mi (14.02 km^{2})
  - Water: 1.846 sq mi (4.78 km^{2})
- Elevation: 794 ft (242 m)

Population (2020)
  - Total: 5,355
  - Density: 989.3/sq mi (382.0/km^{2})
- Time zone: UTC-6 (Central (CST))
  - Summer (DST): UTC-5 (CDT)
- Zip: 53193
- Area code: 262
- FIPS code: 55-87675
- GNIS feature ID: 1576844

Wind Lake is a census-designated place (CDP) in Racine County, Wisconsin, United States. The population was 5,355 at the 2020 census. Wind Lake is in the town of Norway.

== Geography ==
Wind Lake is located at 42°49′19″N 88°9′28″W (42.821952, -88.157810).

According to the United States Census Bureau, the CDP has a total area of 7.3 square miles (18.8 km^{2}), of which 5.4 square miles (14.0 km^{2}) is land and 1.8 square miles (4.8 km^{2}) (25.43%) is water.

== Demographics ==
Historical population
Census	Pop.	Note	%±
1990	3,748		—
2000	5,202		38.8%
2010	5,342		2.7%
2020	5,355		0.2%

=== 2020 census ===
As of the 2020 census, Wind Lake had a population of 5,355. The median age was 47.4 years. 20.3% of residents were under the age of 18 and 17.7% of residents were 65 years of age or older. For every 100 females there were 107.9 males, and for every 100 females age 18 and over there were 106.3 males age 18 and over.

75.6% of residents lived in urban areas, while 24.4% lived in rural areas.

There were 2,162 households in Wind Lake, of which 28.5% had children under the age of 18 living in them. Of all households, 64.2% were married-couple households, 15.3% were households with a male householder and no spouse or partner present, and 13.9% were households with a female householder and no spouse or partner present. About 19.6% of all households were made up of individuals and 9.3% had someone living alone who was 65 years of age or older.

There were 2,293 housing units, of which 5.7% were vacant. The homeowner vacancy rate was 0.3% and the rental vacancy rate was 2.8%.

Racial composition as of the 2020 census
Race	Number	Percent
White	5,042	94.2%
Black or African American	11	0.2%
American Indian and Alaska Native	16	0.3%
Asian	38	0.7%
Native Hawaiian and Other Pacific Islander	0	0.0%
Some other race	41	0.8%
Two or more races	207	3.9%
Hispanic or Latino (of any race)	179	3.3%

=== 2000 census ===
At the 2000 census there were 5,202 people, 1,817 households, and 1,466 families in the CDP. The population density was 986.5 people per square mile (381.1/km^{2}). There were 1,933 housing units at an average density of 366.6/sq mi (141.6/km^{2}). The racial makeup of the CDP was 98.15% White, 0.31% African American, 0.35% Native American, 0.25% Asian, 0.06% Pacific Islander, 0.31% from other races, and 0.58% from two or more races. Hispanic or Latino of any race were 1.69%.

Of the 1,817 households 42.3% had children under the age of 18 living with them, 70.6% were married couples living together, 6.5% had a female householder with no husband present, and 19.3% were non-families. 14.5% of households were one person and 4.7% were one person aged 65 or older. The average household size was 2.86 and the average family size was 3.19.

The age distribution was 29.5% under the age of 18, 5.7% from 18 to 24, 33.9% from 25 to 44, 23.0% from 45 to 64, and 7.9% 65 or older. The median age was 36 years. For every 100 females, there were 103.8 males. For every 100 females age 18 and over, there were 102.8 males.

The median household income was $68,378 and the median family income was $74,497. Males had a median income of $46,596 versus $31,716 for females. The per capita income for the CDP was $24,765. About 1.1% of families and 3.4% of the population were below the poverty line, including 2.2% of those under age 18 and 2.0% of those age 65 or over.
