= Western Union Junction Railroad Museum =

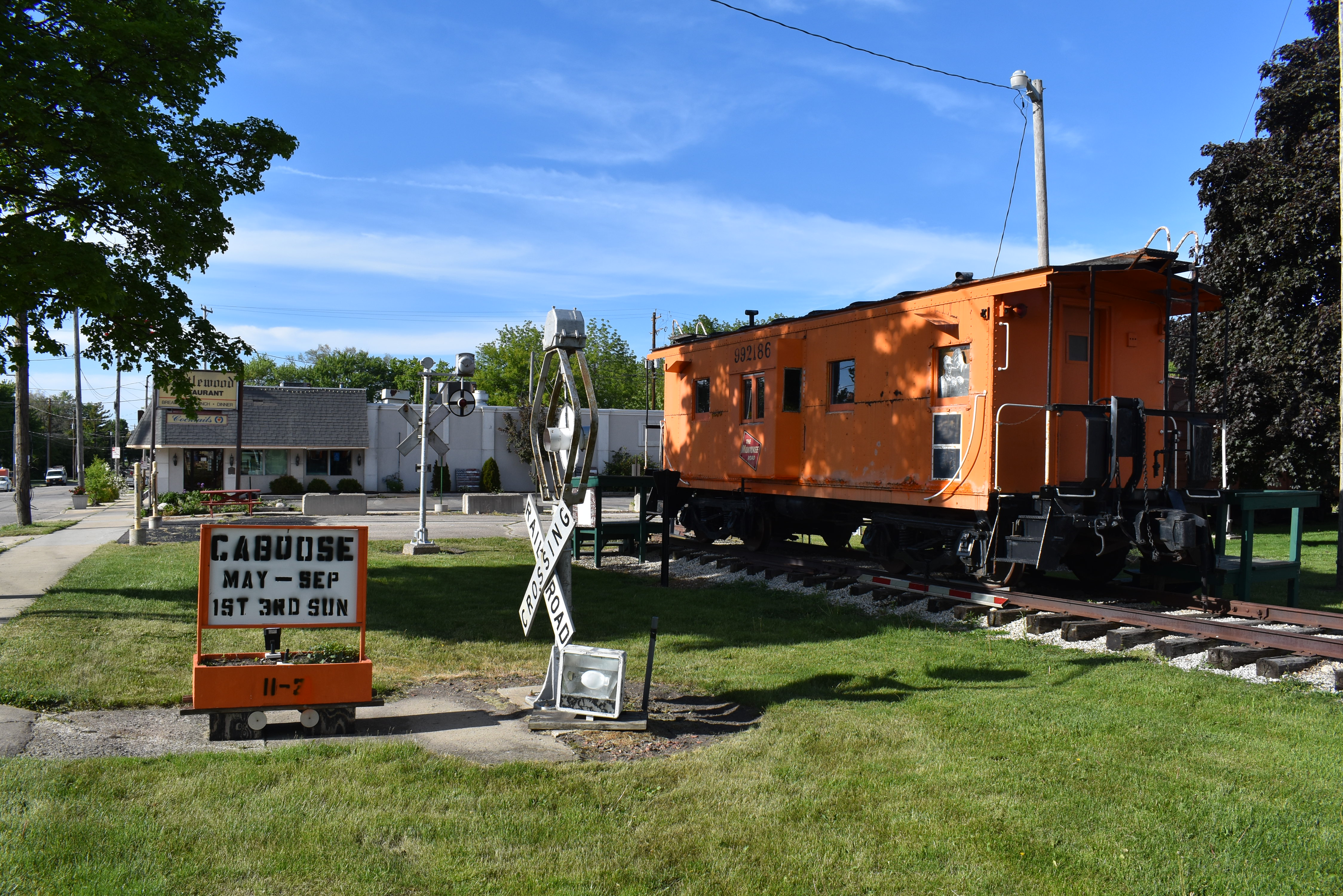
- Western Union Junction Railroad Museum in 2023
- Established: 1992
- Location: Sturtevant, Racine County, Wisconsin
- Coordinates: 42.70108°N 87.90441°W
- Type: Railroad museum
- Collections: Chicago, Milwaukee, St. Paul and Pacific Railroad artifacts

The Western Union Junction Railroad Museum is a railroad museum in Sturtevant, Wisconsin, run by the Western Union Junction Railroad Museum, Inc.

It is located across the street from the original location of the Chicago, Milwaukee, St. Paul and Pacific Railroad (Milwaukee Road) depot, and near trackage of the Canadian Pacific Railway.

The equipment owned by the museum includes three Milwaukee Road Boxcars, a Milwaukee Road Caboose, a MT14 Fairmont Speeder work train, and several old signals.
