= W. Grant Nelson =

American politician

W. Grant Nelson (July 4, 1869 – March 9, 1946) was an American politician.

Born in the town of Norway, Racine County, Wisconsin, Nelson worked for the Wisconsin Gas and Electric Company and was a crew construction foreman and as a right-of-way agent. In 1923, Nelson served in the Wisconsin State Assembly and was a Republican. Nelson died in a hospital in Racine, Wisconsin.
