= August J. Piper =

American politician

August J. Piper (November 23, 1864 – July 12, 1945) was an American farmer and politician.

Born in the town of Mount Pleasant, Wisconsin, Piper was a trunk farmer and supported cooperative marketing. Piper served as chairman of the Mount Pleasant Town Board and also served on the Kenosha School Board. From 1929 to 1933, Piper served in the Wisconsin State Assembly and was a Republican. In 1939, the University of Wisconsin conferred an award on Piper in recognition of his service to agriculture. Piper died at his home in Mount Pleasant, Wisconsin.
