= John Edmund Fries =

American football player and coach (1885–1955)

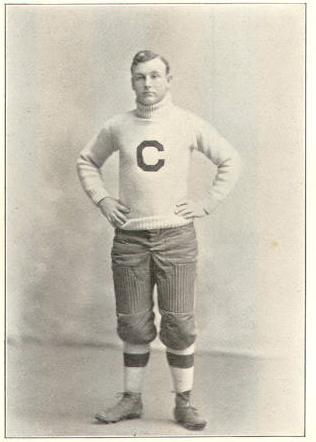
- Fries, suited up for the 1908 Carroll College yearbook photo

Biographical details
- Born: June 19, 1885; Norway, Wisconsin, U.S.
- Died: January 21, 1955 (aged 69); Burlington, Wisconsin, U.S.

Playing career
- 1904–1908: Carroll (WI)
- Position: Right tackle

Coaching career (HC unless noted)
- 1914–1918: Carroll (WI)
- 1920: Carroll (WI)

Head coaching record
- Overall: 11–14–5

John Edmund Fries (June 19, 1885 – January 21, 1955) was an American football player and coach.

== Early life and playing career ==
Fries was born in Norway, Wisconsin in 1885. Fries played right tackle at Carroll College in Waukesha, Wisconsin. In his senior year, he was captain of the team that he played on for four years. As a player, he witnessed his opposing team throw the first legal forward pass on September 5, 1906, in a 22–0 loss against Saint Louis.

Fries also played on the basketball team at Carroll and his brother Arthur (who students affectionately called "Nuts") played left tackle for the football team.

== Coaching career ==
Fries was named the 11th head football coach for his alma mater and he held that position for five seasons, from 1914 until 1918 and then returning for the 1920 season. His career coaching record at Carroll College was 11 wins, 14 losses, and 5 ties. This ranks him 12th at Carroll College in total wins and 19th at Carroll College in winning percentage. The school did not field a team in 1917 because of World War I. His best season was 1914 with a 5–1 record, defeating Marquette and Lake Forest. His teams also played Loyola of Chicago, Michigan, and Michigan State. The Michigan Wolverines soundly beat them by a score of 54 to 0 in the 1916 season under legendary coach Fielding Yost, where Carroll only produced one first down the entire game.

While coaching, he also was the physical director and a professor of mathematics at Carroll. Fries died at a hospital in Burlington, Wisconsin in 1955. He was buried at Norway Cemetery in Norway, Wisconsin, his birthplace.

In 1986, the school honored his contribution to sports at the school by inducting him into their "Athletic Hall of Fame" for exemplary performance in competition and their contributions to athletics at Carroll.
