= Edward F. Hilker =

American politician (1881–1949)

Member of the Wisconsin Senate from the 21st district
- In office January 12, 1943 – March 4, 1949
- Preceded by: Kenneth L. Greenquist
- Succeeded by: Gerald T. Flynn

Member of the Wisconsin State Assembly from the Racine 2nd district
- In office January 8, 1941 – January 12, 1943
- Preceded by: Jack Harvey
- Succeeded by: Willis Frazell
- In office January 14, 1924 – January 11, 1933
- Preceded by: Jacob Stoffel Jr.
- Succeeded by: Joseph C. Hamata

Member of the Racine City Council
- In office 1916–1930

Personal details
- Born: April 13, 1881 Racine, Wisconsin, U.S.
- Died: March 4, 1949 (aged 67) Madison, Wisconsin, U.S.
- Resting place: Mound Cemetery, Racine
- Party: Republican
- Spouse: Anne Deschler
- Children: Grace (Wabakkan)

Military service
- Allegiance: United States
- Branch/service: United States Army
- Years of service: 1898
- Rank: Private, USV
- Unit: 1st Reg. Wis. Vol. Infantry
- Battles/wars: Spanish–American War

Edward F. Hilker (April 13, 1881 – March 4, 1949) was an American politician. He served six years in the Wisconsin State Senate and ten years in the Wisconsin State Assembly.

== Biography ==
Hilker was born April 13, 1881, in Racine, Wisconsin, to Adolph and Carline Hilker. His father was a pioneer brick manufacturer in Racine. In 1898, at age 17, he volunteered for service in the Spanish–American War and was enlisted as a private in Company M, 1st Wisconsin Volunteer Infantry Regiment. The war ended before his regiment saw any combat and he mustered out the same year. He married Anne Deschler on November 11, 1899, and together they had one daughter, Grace. Hilker worked in the candy wholesale business, as a coal broker, and in sales promotion. He was a member of the United Spanish War Veterans, the Fraternal Order of Eagles, and the Knights of Pythias.

== Political career ==
In 1916, Hilker was elected Alderman for the 8th ward on the Racine City Council. He was re-elected six times, and served on the City Council until 1930.

In 1924, Hilker was elected to the Wisconsin Assembly for the Racine 2nd District. He was re-elected in 1926, 1928, and 1930. He ran for re-election again in 1932, but was defeated by former assemblyman, Democrat Joseph C. Hamata.

Hilker remained active in politics and was a delegate to the 1936 Republican National Convention.

In 1940, he reclaimed his former Assembly seat, defeating incumbent Wisconsin Progressive assemblyman Jack Harvey.

In 1942, he was elected to the Wisconsin Senate in the 21st District, representing all of Racine County. He was a delegate, again, to the 1944 Republican National Convention. He was re-elected to the senate in 1946, but died before the end of his second term.

== Death ==
For years before his death, Hilker struggled with a diabetic condition. In early 1949, he was hospitalized at the Wisconsin General Hospital in Madison, Wisconsin. He deteriorated over several weeks until his death on March 4, 1949, with his wife and daughter were by his bedside.

His funeral was held at the Holy Communion Lutheran Church in Racine. It was attended by many Wisconsin legislators, including pallbearers senators Bernhard Gettelman, Chester Dempsey, J. Earl Leverich, Taylor G. Brown, and Everett F. LaFond, and assemblyman Fred Pfennig. He was laid to rest at Mound Cemetery in Racine, less than half a mile from his former home.

== Electoral history ==
=== Wisconsin Assembly (1924-1932) ===
Wisconsin Assembly, Racine 2nd District Election, 1924
Party	Candidate	Votes	%	±%
Republican	Edward F. Hilker	5,412	81.84%	
Democratic	Ernest Anheuser	1,201	18.16%	
Socialist	Lars P. Christiansen			
Total votes		'6,613'	'100.0%'	
Republican hold				

Wisconsin Assembly, Racine 2nd District Election, 1926
Party	Candidate	Votes	%	±%
Republican	Edward F. Hilker (incumbent)	4,984	90.97%	+9.13%
Socialist	Lars P. Christiansen	495	9.03%	
Total votes		'5,479'	'100.0%'	
Republican hold				

Wisconsin Assembly, Racine 2nd District Election, 1928
Party	Candidate	Votes	%	±%
Republican	Edward F. Hilker (incumbent)	8,189	100.0%	+9.03%
Total votes		'8,189'	'100.0%'	
Republican hold				

Wisconsin Assembly, Racine 2nd District Election, 1930
Party	Candidate	Votes	%	±%
Primary Election
Republican	Edward F. Hilker (incumbent)	3,964	61.64%	
Republican	Lawrence A. Brown, Jr.	2,412	37.51%	
Socialist	Joseph Becker	55	0.86%	
Total votes		'6,431'	'100.0%'	
General Election
Republican	Edward F. Hilker (incumbent)	4,327	63.43%	−36.57%
Republican	Lawrence A. Brown, Jr.	1,671	24.49%	
Socialist	Joseph Becker	824	12.08%	
Total votes		'6,822'	'100.0%'	
Republican hold				

Wisconsin Assembly, Racine 2nd District Election, 1932
Party	Candidate	Votes	%	±%
Primary Election
Republican	Edward F. Hilker (incumbent)	2,214	24.83%	
Republican	Mr. Porter	1,899	21.30%	
Republican	Mr. Ahlgrimm	1,752	19.65%	
Republican	Mr. Windstrup	1,080	12.11%	
Socialist	John Duller	754	8.46%	
Democratic	Joseph C. Hamata	686	7.69%	
Democratic	Mr. Schowalter	532	5.97%	
Total votes		'8,917'	'100.0%'	
General Election
Democratic	Joseph C. Hamata	5,794	48.98%	
Republican	Edward F. Hilker (incumbent)	4,798	40.56%	−22.87%
Socialist	John Duller	1,186	10.03%	
Independent	Ransom DeFaut	51	0.43%	
Total votes		'11,829'	'100.0%'	
Democratic gain from Republican				

=== Wisconsin Assembly (1940) ===
Wisconsin Assembly, Racine 2nd District Election, 1940
Party	Candidate	Votes	%	±%
Primary Election
Progressive	Jack Harvey (incumbent)	1,862	23.59%	
Republican	Edward F. Hilker	1,823	23.10%	
Republican	Mr. Nelson	1,162	14.72%	
Democratic	Philip M. Geyer	1,027	13.01%	
Republican	Mr. White	1,018	12.90%	
Democratic	Mr. Rogan	1,000	12.67%	
Total votes		'7,892'	'100.0%'	
General Election
Republican	Edward F. Hilker	5,878	41.92%	
Progressive	Jack Harvey (incumbent)	5,652	40.31%	
Democratic	Philip M. Geyer	2,493	17.78%	
Total votes		'14,023'	'100.0%'	
Republican gain from Progressive				

=== Wisconsin Senate (1942-1946) ===
Wisconsin Senate 21st District Election, 1942
Party	Candidate	Votes	%	±%
Primary Election
Republican	Edward F. Hilker	7,067	68.10%	
Democratic	William J. Swoboda	2,444	23.55%	
Progressive	Martin H. Herzog	865	8.34%	
Socialist	Mr. Dadian	1	0.01%	
Total votes		'7,892'	'100.0%'	
General Election
Republican	Edward F. Hilker	11,942	46.78%	
Progressive	Martin H. Herzog	7,197	28.19%	
Democratic	William J. Swoboda	6,390	25.03%	
Total votes		'25,529'	'100.0%'	
Republican gain from Progressive				

Wisconsin Senate 21st District Election, 1946
Party	Candidate	Votes	%	±%
Primary Election
Republican	Edward F. Hilker (incumbent)	4,952	34.44%	
Republican	Mr. Harvey	3,863	26.87%	
Democratic	Arthur E. Rohan	2,120	14.74%	
Democratic	Mr. Gorsky	1,830	12.73%	
Republican	Mr. Southey	1,601	11.14%	
Socialist	Victor Cooks	12	0.08%	
Total votes		'14,378'	'100.0%'	
General Election
Republican	Edward F. Hilker (incumbent)	18,909	55.66%	+8.89%
Democratic	Arthur E. Rohan	14,661	43.16%	
Socialist	Victor Cooks	400	1.18%	
Total votes		'33,970'	'100.0%'	+33.06%
Republican hold				
