= Hiram D. Morse =

19th century American politician

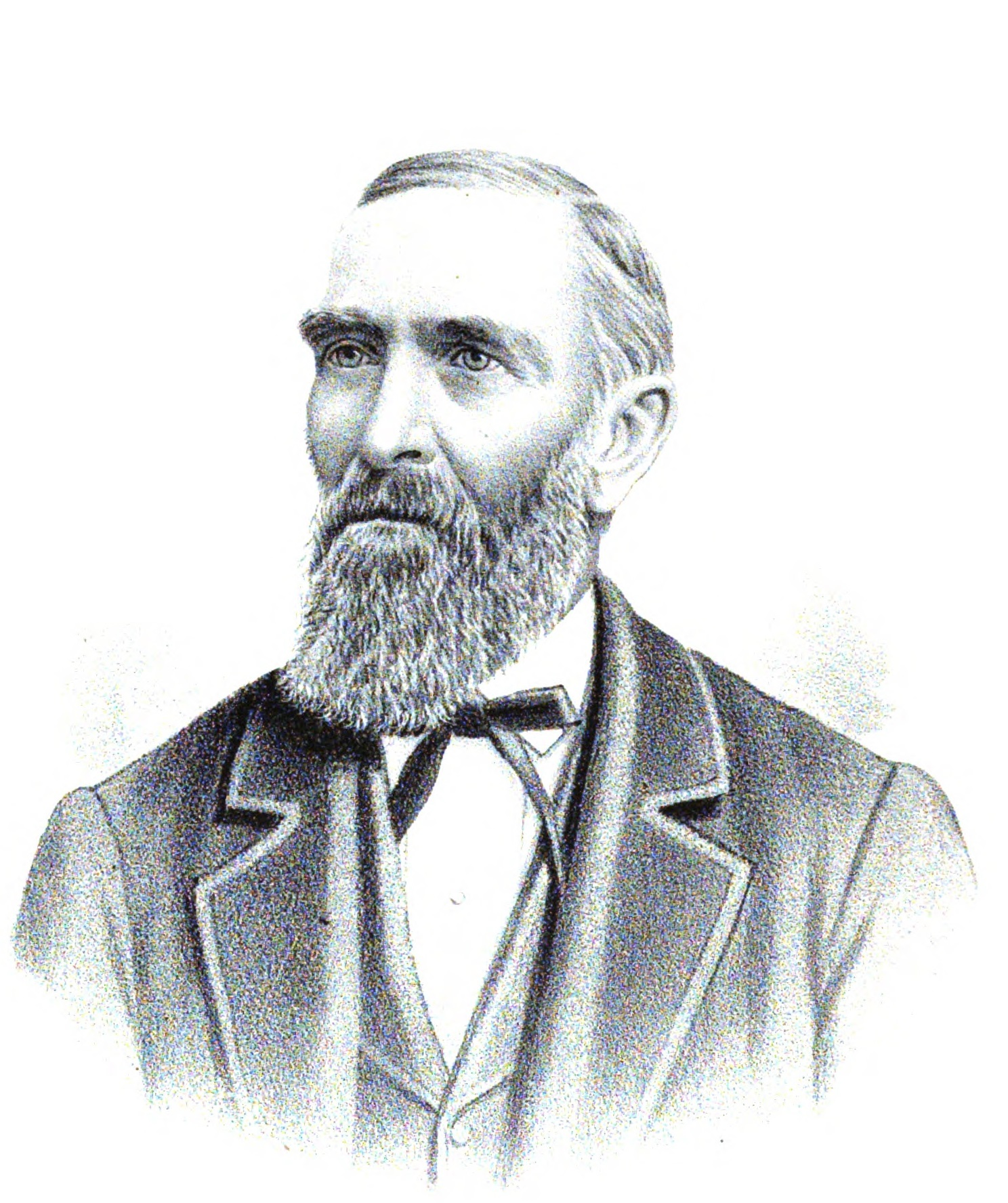
- From Portrait and Biographical Album of Racine and Kenosha Counties (1892)

Chairman of the Board of Supervisors of Racine County, Wisconsin
- In office January 7, 1878 – January 6, 1879
- Preceded by: John Bosustow
- Succeeded by: Hugh Gorton
- In office January 2, 1871 – January 1, 1872
- Preceded by: Position re-established
- Succeeded by: J. A. Carswell
- In office January 4, 1858 – January 6, 1862
- Preceded by: L. C. Northway
- Succeeded by: Position abolished

Member of the Wisconsin State Assembly from the Racine 2nd district
- In office January 7, 1867 – January 6, 1868
- Preceded by: George Q. Erskine
- Succeeded by: Hiram L. Gilmore

Personal details
- Born: January 29, 1815 Hamburg, New York, U.S.
- Died: April 21, 1899 (aged 84) Honey Creek, Walworth County, Wisconsin, U.S.
- Resting place: Honey Creek Cemetery, Rochester, Wisconsin
- Party: Republican; Whig (before 1854)
- Spouse: Marilla Nancy Beardsley (m. 1843; died 1896)
- Children: Herman Olney Morse^{(b. 1845; died 1933)}; Rosella (Harden)^{(b. 1846; died 1923)}; Edwin Morse^{(b. 1848; died 1941)}; Walter Morse^{(b. 1851; died 1918)}; Alice Morse^{(b. 1854; died 1854)}; Emma M. (Lapham)^{(b. 1855; died 1922)}; Idella (Cooper)^{(b. 1861; died 1942)}
- Occupation: Farmer

Hiram David Morse (January 29, 1815 – April 21, 1899) was an American farmer, politician, and Wisconsin pioneer. He was one of the earliest American settlers in what is now Racine County, Wisconsin, and he represented Racine County in the Wisconsin State Assembly during the 1867 session.

== Biography ==
Morse was born on January 29, 1815, in Hamburg, New York. He was raised and educated on his father's farm and attended school in Chautauqua County, New York. At age 19, he went to Upper Canada, to work as an accountant in a mercantile business, remaining for two years. In 1836, he set out for the west, intent to travel to the Wisconsin Territory.

He attempted to ship a trunk of his belongings from Toledo, Ohio, to the new settlement at the present site of Racine, Wisconsin, but his belongings never arrived. He went by foot from Toledo to Chicago, then quickly continued along the lakeshore to Racine. He worked as a paid farmhand in the neighboring town of Caledonia for two years, then used his earnings to purchase unimproved land in the town of Rochester to start his own farm, where he was joined by his brother. He later relocated further west to the town of Waterford, on about 400 acres which became known as the "Morse homestead".

He served more than 30 years on the Racine County Board of Supervisors, and was chairman of the board in 1858, 1859, 1860, 1861, 1871, and 1878. He also served through much of the 1860s and 1870s as the western district superintendent for the poor in Racine County. During the American Civil War, he also served as a draft commissioner for Racine County.

Morse was originally a member of the Whig Party, but joined the Republican Party when it was organized in 1854. He was elected on the Republican Party ticket to the Wisconsin State Assembly in the 1866 general election. At the time, his district comprised all of Racine County other than the city of Racine. During his term, he secured a charter for the Rochester Seminary in Rochester, Wisconsin, where he later served as treasurer.

Morse died in the neighboring town of Honey Creek, Walworth County, Wisconsin, on April 21, 1899. He was 84 years old.

== Personal life and family ==
Hiram D. Morse was one of eleven children born to William Morse and his wife Lydia (née Ford). William Morse served in the Vermont militia during the American Revolutionary War, and was a prosperous farmer later in life. The Morses trace their ancestry back to Suffolk, England, and are descended from the colonist Samuel Morse, who settled at Watertown in the Massachusetts Bay Colony in 1635.

Hiram D. Morse married Marilla Beardsley on May 31, 1843. Marilla was another early Racine County pioneer who came to the territory with her parents in 1835. They had seven children, though one died in infancy.

Wisconsin State Assembly
Preceded by George Q. Erskine	Member of the Wisconsin State Assembly from the Racine 2nd district January 7, 1867 – January 6, 1868	Succeeded by Hiram L. Gilmore
Political offices
Preceded by L. C. Northway	Chairman of the Board of Supervisors of Racine County, Wisconsin; January 4, 1858 – January 6, 1862	Office abolished
Office re-established	Chairman of the Board of Supervisors of Racine County, Wisconsin; January 2, 1871 – January 1, 1872	Succeeded by J. A. Carswell
Preceded by John Bosustow	Chairman of the Board of Supervisors of Racine County, Wisconsin; January 7, 1878 – January 6, 1879	Succeeded by Hugh Gorton
