= Thomas Butler (Wisconsin pioneer) =

19th-century American politician

Member of the Wisconsin State Assembly from the Racine 2nd district
- In office January 6, 1862 – January 1, 1863
- Preceded by: Orlando C. Munroe
- Succeeded by: Orlando C. Munroe

Personal details
- Party: Democratic

Thomas Butler (born c.1810) was an American farmer, Democratic politician, and Wisconsin pioneer. He served one term in the Wisconsin State Assembly, representing Racine County's 2nd Assembly district during the 15th Wisconsin Legislature (1862).

Wisconsin State Assembly
| Preceded by Orlando C. Munroe | Member of the Wisconsin State Assembly from the Racine 2nd district January 6, 1862 – January 1, 1863 | Succeeded by Orlando C. Munroe |
