= Patrick Cheves =

American politician (1820–1883)

Patrick Gray Cheves or Cheeves (May 16, 1820 – April 21, 1883) was an American farmer from Norway, Wisconsin who served two terms, 1856 and 1878, 22 years apart, as a member of the Wisconsin State Assembly from Racine County, Wisconsin.

== Background ==
Cheeves was born in Fraserburgh, Aberdeenshire, Scotland on May 16, 1820, son of James Cheves, a stonemason, and Elizabeth (Morrison) Cheves. Due to the poverty of his father and the ill health of his mother, Cheves was sent at an early age to live with his grandmother, and remained there until the age of eight; spent six more years with one uncle working on the farm and as a herdboy and occasionally attending the local schools; then two more years with another uncle, a farmer and small merchant. He left home for Aberdeen, and after many tribulations found employment in a counting house. Returning home, he was welcomed by the family he'd fled, but eventually resolved to emigrate to the United States. Having met one William Smith, a native Scotsman now resident in Pike Grove, Kenosha County, in the Wisconsin Territory who was home visiting friends and family, Cheves accepted Smith's offer of passage money to America, and a job once he arrived there. He traveled in company with three others: Margaret, a sister of William Smith; James Smith, his nephew; and James Duguid, a kinsman of Cheves. They sailed from Liverpool in April 1840, landed in New York City, and proceeded by land and lakeboat, arriving in Southport (now Kenosha) in the Wisconsin Territory, on June 1, 1840. He worked for Smith until his debt was paid, and then briefly worked on the Illinois and Michigan Canal.

In 1842 he moved on to the lead mining district flourishing at and around Mineral Point, Wisconsin. There he worked in a brewery during the winters, while in the summers he worked washing copper ore. While working in the mining country, he became involved in the spontaneous defense of two British-born abolitionist speakers from a rowdy crowd, and developed a lifelong antipathy to slavery. The winter of 1844-45 he worked in a sawmill near Racine. In the spring of 1845 he purchased eighty acres of land in what was then the Town of Yorkville, where he took up the profession of farming. In June 1845, he married Elizabeth Smith of Pike Grove in Kenosha County, like himself a native of Scotland (born February 10, 1822). They eventually had six children, two of whom died in infancy.

== Public office and private business ==
In 1847 the town Yorkville was divided, and the Town of Norway (named after the homeland of many of its settlers) was split off from it. The new town had only nine legal voters, none of whom had previously held public office, and Cheves found himself elected town clerk, an office he held for three years. He was subsequently elected to the town board, holding office for three years, and chairman of the town board, thus ex officio a member of the county Board of Supervisors.

Cheves had been known as a Free Soiler, and was elected to the legislature in the fall of 1855, from Racine County's 4th Assembly district, as a Republican Party succeeding fellow Republican Ebenezer Adams. He served one term, and was succeeded the following year by James Catton, another Republican. In the autumn of 1856 he was elected by the new party as clerk of the board of supervisors of Racine County, a position he held for two years. In the autumn of 1856 his barn, which contained all his crops and farming implements, burnt down with all its contents. During his term of office he speculated in personal loans, often to his profit; but also sustained reverses in that business, and in several years of expensive and vexatious litigation.

In 1863 he was once again elected clerk of the board, a position which he held for four years more. He then purchased a soap and candle factory in Racine, which he conducted successfully for several years, as well as engaging in other branches of business (and continued to operate his rebuilt farm).

In 1869, he was the Republican candidate for Racine County Judge, but was defeated by an independent, Elbert O. Hand (who also received the Democratic endorsement) by 886 votes.

== Back to the Assembly ==
In 1876 he was again elected to the Assembly from Racine County's 2nd District (the Towns of Burlington, Caledonia, Dover, Mt. Pleasant, Norway, Rochester, Raymond, Waterford and Yorkville) as a member of the Liberal Reform Party (a short-lived coalition of Democrats, reform and Liberal Republicans, and Grangers formed in 1873, which had secured the election for two years of a Governor of Wisconsin as well as electing a number of state legislators, but was in the last throes of disintegration. He won 1,194 votes to 1,034 for Jacob S. Crane, the Republican candidate (Republican incumbent John T. Rice was not a candidate). He was assigned to the standing committee on town and county organization, and the joint committee on claims. He was not a candidate for re-election in 1877, and was succeeded by Republican Knud Adland; there was no Reformer (or Democrat) in the race in that district.

== Returning home ==
He died April 21, 1883, at his farm in Norway. Elizabeth lived until July 7, 1902, dying after a fall at the old family farm in Norway; in her obituary, Patrick was recalled as "one of the most prominent farmers and Republicans in the county."
