= Henry F. Johnson =

American politician

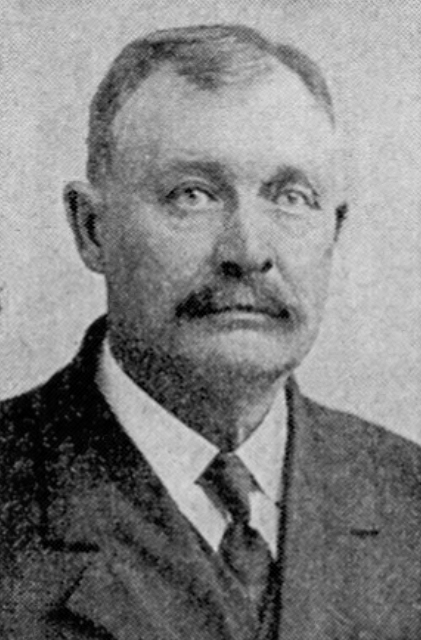
- Born: March 5, 1860; Norway, Wisconsin, United States
- Died: March 6, 1941 (aged 81); Racine, Wisconsin, United States
- Occupation: Politician
- Known for: Member, Wisconsin State Assembly (1919–1923)
- Political party: Republican

Henry F. Johnson (March 5, 1860 – March 6, 1941) was a member of the Wisconsin State Assembly.

== Biography ==
Johnson was born on March 5, 1860, in Norway, Wisconsin. He was a farmer in the area, and also involved in the insurance and telephone industries. Johnson was an active Lutheran. He died on March 6, 1941, in Racine, Wisconsin.

== Electoral career ==
Johnson was a member of the Wisconsin Assembly from 1919 to 1923. Previously, he had been Chairman (similar to Mayor) of Norway and a member of the Racine County, Wisconsin Board of Supervisors from 1896 to 1903. Other positions Johnson held include school board member. He was a Republican.
