= Mount Pleasant, Wisconsin =

- Village
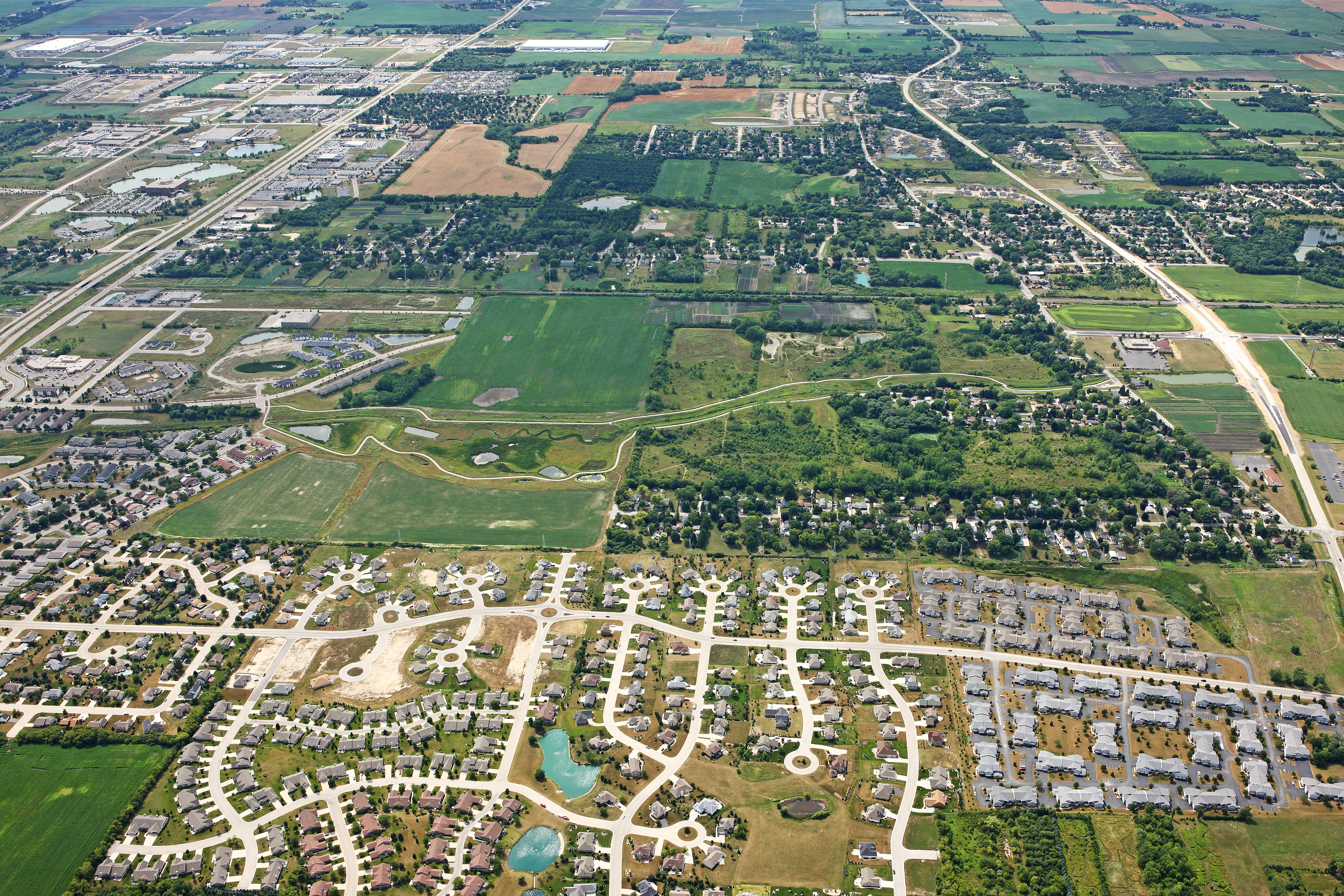
- Aerial image of central Mount Pleasant (2009)

- Flag
- Interactive map of Mount Pleasant, Wisconsin
- Location within Wisconsin Location within the United States
- Coordinates: 42°43′33″N 87°53′31″W
- Country: United States
- State: Wisconsin
- County: Racine
- Settled: 1835
- Township: 1842
- Incorporated: 2003

Government
  - Type: Board of Trustees
  - President: David DeGroot

Area
  - Total: 34.03 sq mi (88.15 km^{2})
  - Land: 33.88 sq mi (87.76 km^{2})
  - Water: 0.15 sq mi (0.39 km^{2})
- Elevation: 715 ft (218 m)

Population (2020)
  - Total: 27,732
  - Density: 799/sq mi (308.6/km^{2})
- Time zone: UTC−6 (CST)
  - Summer (DST): UTC−5 (CDT)
- Area code: 262
- FIPS code: 55-54875
- GNIS ID: 2012620
- Website: mtpleasantwi.gov

Mount Pleasant is a village in Racine County, Wisconsin, United States. It is located approximately 30 miles (48 km) south of Milwaukee and 60 miles (97 km) north of Chicago. The village's population was 27,732 at the 2020 census.

== History ==
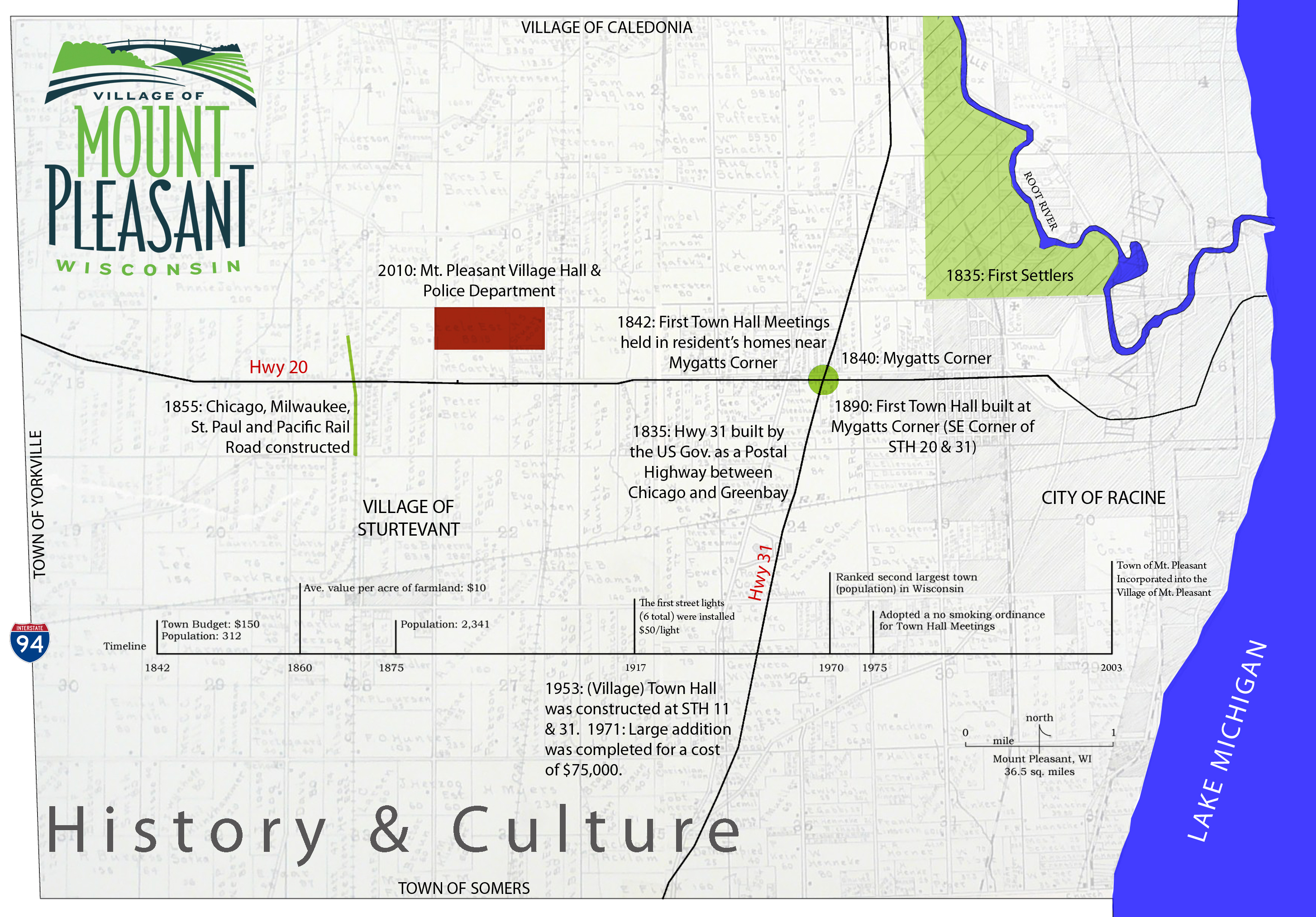
History of Mount Pleasant

The community was established as the Town of Mount Pleasant in 1842 when a small group of residents met to organize the settlement. In 1972, Mount Pleasant adopted its zoning ordinance, which established significant locally controlled development. On September 16, 2003, Mount Pleasant incorporated as a village following a referendum passed by the residents.

== Geography ==
According to the United States Census Bureau, the village has a total area of 35.35 square miles (91.56 km^{2}), of which 33.73 square miles (87.36 km^{2}) is land and 1.62 square miles (4.20 km^{2}) is water. Local Area Code is 262.

== Demographics ==
Historical population
Census	Pop.	Note	%±
1980	19,340		—
1990	20,084		3.8%
2000	23,142		15.2%
2010	26,197		13.2%
2020	27,732		5.9%
U.S. Decennial Census

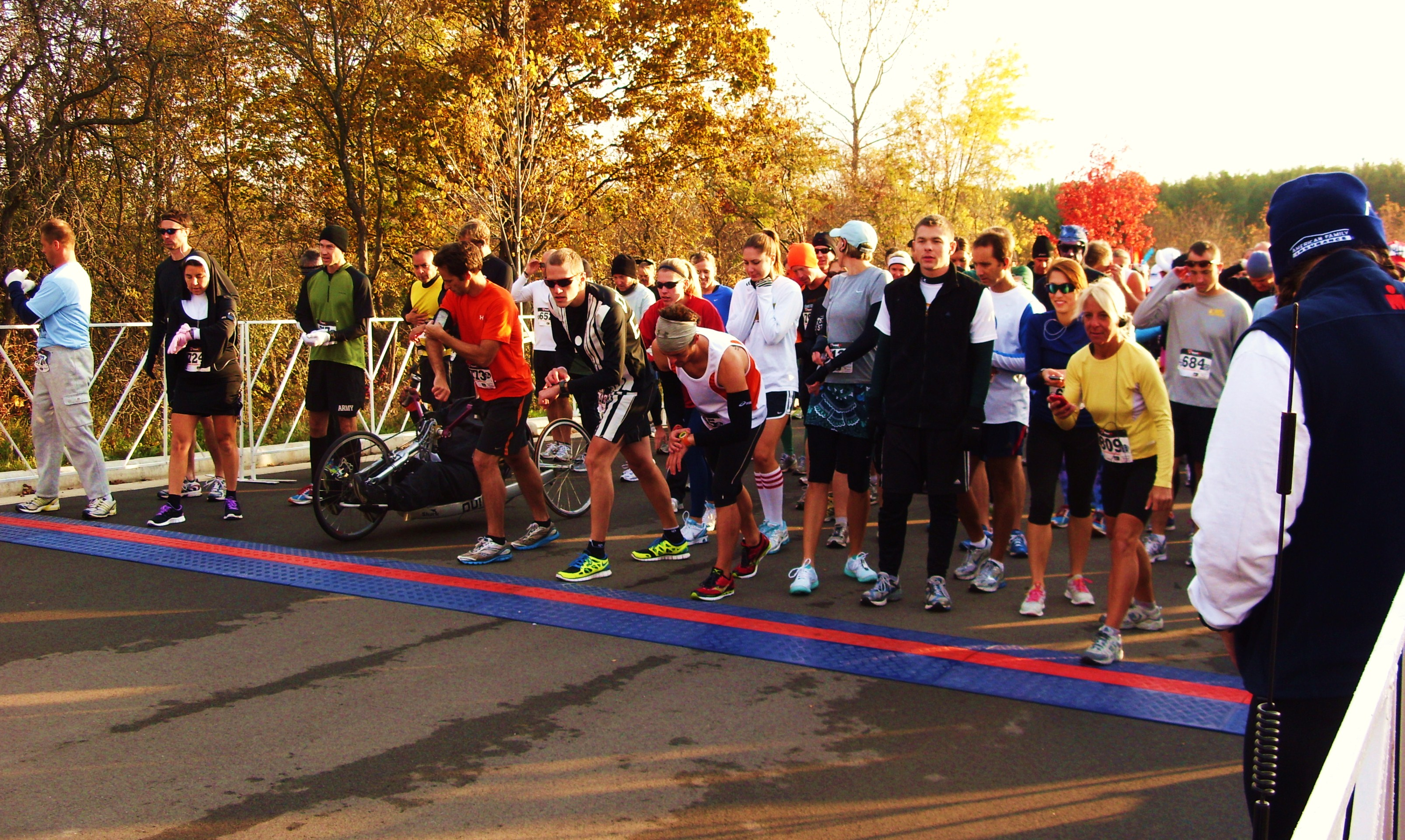
Start of the 2011 Real Racine Skeleton Skamper at Mount Pleasant Civic Campus

=== 2020 census ===
As of the 2020 census, Mount Pleasant had a population of 27,732. The median age was 47.7 years. 19.3% of residents were under the age of 18 and 24.1% of residents were 65 years of age or older. For every 100 females there were 92.5 males, and for every 100 females age 18 and over there were 90.2 males age 18 and over.

97.0% of residents lived in urban areas, while 3.0% lived in rural areas.

There were 12,090 households in Mount Pleasant, of which 23.4% had children under the age of 18 living in them. Of all households, 49.4% were married-couple households, 16.3% were households with a male householder and no spouse or partner present, and 28.0% were households with a female householder and no spouse or partner present. About 31.7% of all households were made up of individuals and 16.9% had someone living alone who was 65 years of age or older.

There were 12,667 housing units, of which 4.6% were vacant. The homeowner vacancy rate was 0.7% and the rental vacancy rate was 3.9%.

Racial composition as of the 2020 census
Race	Number	Percent
White	21,445	77.3%
Black or African American	2,168	7.8%
American Indian and Alaska Native	131	0.5%
Asian	678	2.4%
Native Hawaiian and Other Pacific Islander	8	0.0%
Some other race	987	3.6%
Two or more races	2,315	8.3%
Hispanic or Latino (of any race)	2,943	10.6%

=== 2010 census ===
As of the census of 2010, there were 26,197 people, 11,136 households, and 7,395 families living in the village. The population density was 776.7 inhabitants per square mile (299.9/km^{2}). There were 11,827 housing units at an average density of 350.6 per square mile (135.4/km^{2}). The racial makeup of the village was 86.0% White, 6.7% African American, 0.2% Native American, 2.1% Asian, 2.9% from other races, and 2.0% from two or more races. Hispanic or Latino of any race were 8.3% of the population.

There were 11,136 households, of which 26.4% had children under the age of 18 living with them, 54.1% were married couples living together, 8.5% had a female householder with no husband present, 3.9% had a male householder with no wife present, and 33.6% were non-families. 29.2% of all households were made up of individuals, and 14.3% had someone living alone who was 65 years of age or older. The average household size was 2.33 and the average family size was 2.86.

The median age in the village was 45.8 years. 20.5% of residents were under the age of 18; 6.5% were between the ages of 18 and 24; 22% were from 25 to 44; 31.3% were from 45 to 64; and 19.8% were 65 years of age or older. The gender makeup of the village was 47.9% male and 52.1% female.

=== 2000 census ===
As of the census of 2000, there were 23,142 people, 9,453 households, and 6,513 families living in the village. The population density was 662.6 people per square mile (255.8/km^{2}). There were 9,768 housing units at an average density of 279.7 per square mile (108.0/km^{2}). The racial makeup of the village was 89.17% White, 6.39% African American, 0.26% Native American, 1.21% Asian, 0.03% Pacific Islander, 1.83% from other races, and 1.11% from two or more races. Hispanic or Latino of any race were 4.96% of the population.

There were 9,453 households, out of which 27.8% had children under the age of 18 living with them, 58.3% were married couples living together, 7.7% had a female householder with no husband present, and 31.1% were non-families. 27.2% of all households were made up of individuals, and 12.8% had someone living alone who was 65 years of age or older. The average household size was 2.40 and the average family size was 2.93.

In the village, the population was spread out, with 22.3% under the age of 18, 7.0% from 18 to 24, 24.6% from 25 to 44, 27.3% from 45 to 64, and 18.7% who were 65 years of age or older. The median age was 43 years. For every 100 females, there were 92.3 males. For every 100 females age 18 and over, there were 88.8 males.

The median income for a household in the village was $52,869, and the median income for a family was $63,937. Males had a median income of $47,871 versus $31,317 for females. The per capita income for the village was $27,123. About 2.9% of families and 4.3% of the population were below the poverty line, including 5.4% of those under age 18 and 5.7% of those age 65 or over.

== Economy ==
In October 2017, Foxconn announced that it would build a $10 billion flat-panel TV campus in Mount Pleasant. Mount Pleasant offered $860 million in tax incentives to attract Foxconn, borrowing funds to do so. Mount Pleasant also declared some residential areas as 'blighted' to require residents to vacate the project area. Larger landowners were privately offered up to 5x their assessed value, while smaller landowners were later offered 1.4x assessed value at time of assessment, which in some cases ended up being less than actual value. A number of landowners sued to stop the village's use of eminent domain laws to benefit a private company. Construction was targeted to begin in the second quarter of 2018. The plan for the campus is to expand in phases over five or more years.

In March 2019, with construction still not started, Foxconn announced that they intend to have a functional plant by the end of 2020, though the plant would be smaller than originally planned. In November 2020, construction lagged. According to the company, this was due to problems related to the COVID-19 pandemic. Even with only partial construction, estimates were that Foxconn would be the biggest tax payer in the county. The company has still not made clear exactly what will be produced on the 1,000-acre campus.

In August 2023, The Washington Post noted that the plant still wasn't built and in a July 2024 article briefly referenced the continued absence of the plant there. Numerous critics have cited the case of the Foxconn project as an example of some of the most egregious corporate welfare and as an abuse of eminent domain. As reported in National Review, "...[the worst] is when governments accompany subsidies with the eminent-domain seizure of citizens’ property...[as with the case of Foxconn in Wisconsin]..."

In September 2025, Microsoft announced the construction of the "world's most powerful AI datacenter" at Mount Pleasant.

== Government ==
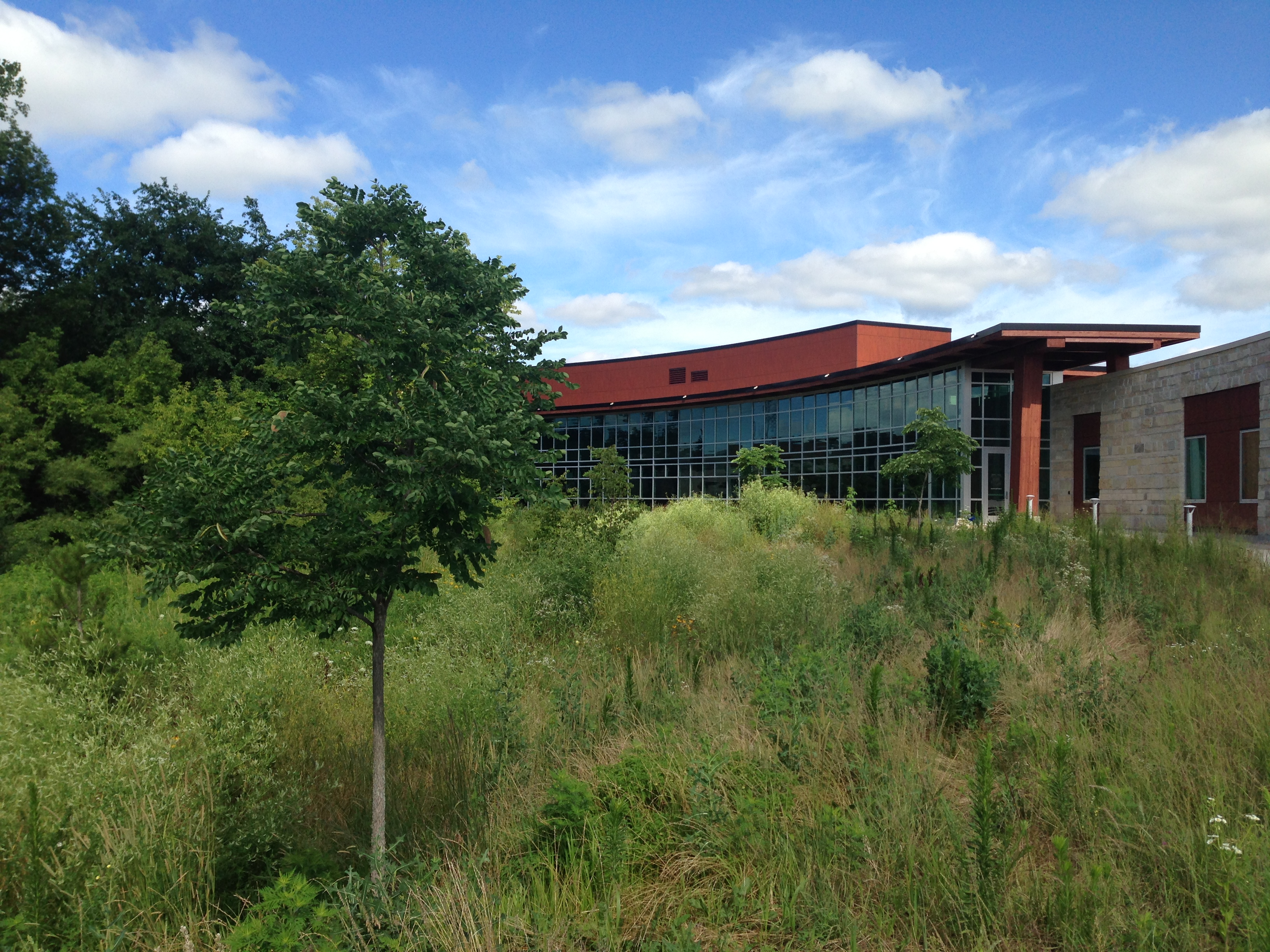
Mount Pleasant village hall (2013)

The Village of Mount Pleasant is governed by a six-member board of trustees and a village president. The president and the board are elected at-large for a term of two years per member. The board enacts local ordinances and approves the village budget. Mount Pleasant has an elected village-wide municipal judge.

Village services include a full-time police department, full-time consolidated fire department (South Shore Fire Department), highway/public works department, and in-house building, planning, development, engineering, and finance departments. The village operates and maintains its own sanitary sewer and storm water utilities, with municipal drinking water provided by the city of Racine.

For federal representation, Mount Pleasant is part of Wisconsin's 1st congressional district, represented by Bryan Steil (R). Wisconsin's two U.S. senators are Ron Johnson (R) and Tammy Baldwin (D).

In Wisconsin's lower state legislative chamber, the Wisconsin State Assembly, nearly all of Mount Pleasant is contained within Wisconsin's 66th Assembly district, represented by Greta Neubauer (D). A small part of northeastern Mount Pleasant falls within the 62nd Assembly district, represented by Robert Wittke (R). In Wisconsin's upper chamber, the Wisconsin Senate, the area represented by the 66th Assembly district falls within Wisconsin's 22nd Senate district, represented by Robert Wirch (D). The area represented by the 62nd Assembly district falls within the 21st Senate district, represented by Van H. Wanggaard (R).

- Fire Protection/Ambulance Service from the South Shore Fire Department
- Police Service from the Mount Pleasant Police Department and Racine County Sheriff

== Education ==
Mount Pleasant's public schools are managed by the Racine Unified School District. Several elementary schools serve sections of the town, including Dr. Jones, West Ridge, Schulte, and Gifford K–8 School. Two K–8 schools, Mitchell and Gifford, serve sections for middle school. Case High School is in Mount Pleasant and serves almost all of the area, while some parts are zoned to Park High School in Racine.

The University of Wisconsin–Parkside is located two miles south of Mount Pleasant in Kenosha. Gateway Technical College is nearby.

== Notable people ==
- Alyssa Marie Bohm, chosen as the 2019 Miss Wisconsin
- Henry Herzog, Wisconsin State Representative, businessman, and farmer, owned a farm in the Town of Mount Pleasant
- August Piper, Wisconsin State Representative and farmer was born in the Town of Mount Pleasant; Piper served as chairman of the Mount Pleasant Town Board
- Fred Venturelli, NFL player, was buried in Mount Pleasant
