= John T. Rice =

19th century American politician

Member of the Wisconsin State Assembly from the Racine 2nd district
- In office January 1, 1877 – January 7, 1878
- Preceded by: Elias White
- Succeeded by: Patrick Cheves

Personal details
- Born: May 24, 1839 Waterford, Wisconsin Territory
- Died: April 8, 1925 (aged 85) Milwaukee Soldiers Home, Milwaukee, Wisconsin, U.S.
- Resting place: Oakwood Cemetery, Waterford, Wisconsin
- Party: Republican
- Spouse: Helene Amelia Boughton (m. 1866; died 1909)
- Children: Nettie Mabel (Crane)^{(b. 1867; died 1951)}; Edith Estelle (De Remer)^{(b. 1868; died 1934)}; Cora Helen (Bartholf)^{(b. 1872; died 1946)}; Evelyn Belle (Moore)^{(b. 1876; died 1968)}
- Parents: Ira A. Rice (father); Orilla (Caldwell) Rice (mother)

Military service
- Allegiance: United States
- Branch/service: United States Volunteers; Union Army
- Years of service: 1861–1864
- Rank: Captain, USV
- Unit: 15th Reg. Wis. Vol. Infantry
- Battles/wars: American Civil War; Battle of Perryville; Battle of Stones River; Tullahoma campaign; Battle of Chickamauga; Atlanta campaign

John Tyler Rice (May 24, 1839 – April 8, 1925) was an American farmer, Republican politician, and Wisconsin pioneer. He was a member of the Wisconsin State Assembly, representing Racine County during the 1877 term. He also served as a Union Army officer during the American Civil War.

He was the first American child born in the township of Rochester, Wisconsin (which then comprised all of the present territory of Rochester and Waterford). His father, Ira A. Rice, was a founder of Waterford, Wisconsin, and also served in the State Assembly.

== Early life ==
Rice was born on May 24, 1839, in what is now the town of Waterford, in Racine County, Wisconsin Territory. He was the first American child born in the township, his parents having arrived there about three years earlier. He received a common school education and went to work as a farmer in Waterford.

== Civil War service ==
Shortly after the outbreak of the American Civil War, Rice volunteered for service in the Union Army. He was commissioned a second lieutenant in Company C, in the 15th Wisconsin Infantry Regiment. The 15th Wisconsin Infantry was known as the "Scandinavian Regiment" due to the large number of Norwegian, Danish, and Swedish immigrants serving in the ranks. The regiment mustered into federal service February 14, 1862; they left Wisconsin about two weeks later, traveling south for service in the western theater of the war.

Almost immediately after arriving in southern Missouri, the regiment was ordered into the Battle of Island Number Ten, but Rice's company was among three that sat out the battle, remaining for the defense of their camp at Bird's Point, Missouri. They rejoined the regiment at Island Number Ten shortly after the battle, as the regiment had been reassigned to guard large stores of ammunition and other materiel that had been captured there. While stationed at Island Ten, Rice was promoted to first lieutenant in June 1862.

The regiment then was sent into central Kentucky, as one of the units responding to Confederate general Braxton Bragg's Heartland Offensive. They participated in the Union victory at the Battle of Perryville, then joined the pursuit of Bragg into Tennessee, defeating Bragg again at the Battle of Stones River.

The next spring, they joined the Tullahoma campaign, knocking Bragg out of Tennessee. But that was followed in the fall of 1863 by the disastrous Battle of Chickamauga. On the first day at Chickamauga, miscommunication led to the 15th Wisconsin coming under friendly fire, and the regiment was scattered by the confusion. Their colonel, Hans Christian Heg, was mortally wounded; three company captains were also killed, including Rice's captain, Hans Hanson. The regiment's major and another captain were severely wounded. Despite the losses, the 15th Wisconsin reassembled and fought admirably on the second day of the battle, with Rice commanding Company C. But the Union line broke, leaving the 15th Wisconsin as one of the last remaining regiments holding their position; many were captured as they eventually left the field.

Rice was one of four remaining officers in the regiment unharmed by the battle. He and the other remaining officers worked to reassemble the company at Chattanooga, where they occupied trenches to deter Confederate counterattack, and suffered from lack of food and supplies. After being relieved from the trenches, the 15th Wisconsin was ordered to East Tennessee, where they remained until the spring of 1864. East Tennessee was an exceptionally unpleasant campaign for the 15th Wisconsin, with frequent marching, poor weather, and few provisions. During those months, Rice was acting adjutant and quartermaster of the regiment. At the end of that time, Rice was officially promoted to captain of Company C, effective April 7, 1864.

In May 1864, the regiment joined Sherman's Atlanta campaign, and participated actively in the Battle of Resaca. After the battle, Rice was placed in command of a convoy, to deliver 365 prisoners of war to Nashville. After his return to Georgia, he was placed in command of an ammunition train until the expiration of his term of service at the end of 1864.

== Political career ==
Rice was a member of the Assembly in 1877. Additionally, he was Chairman (similar to Mayor) of Waterford and Chairman of the Racine County Board of Supervisors. He was a Republican.

== Personal life and family ==
John Rice was one of two known children of Ira A. Rice and his wife Orilla (née Caldwell). The Rice family were descendants of Edmund Rice, a colonist who arrived in the Massachusetts Bay Colony in 1638.

On April 11, 1866, John Rice married Helen Amelia Boughton of New York. They had four daughters and were married for 43 years before her death in 1909.

Rice resided in Burlington until old age, when he moved to the Milwaukee Soldiers Home. He died there on April 8, 1925, at age 85.

Wisconsin State Assembly
Preceded by Elias White	Member of the Wisconsin State Assembly from the Racine 2nd district January 1, 1877 – January 7, 1878	Succeeded by Patrick Cheves
