= Honey Creek, Walworth County, Wisconsin =

Honey Creek, Wisconsin
- Unincorporated community
- Location within Wisconsin Location within the United States
- Country: United States
- State: Wisconsin
- County: Walworth
- Elevation: 807 ft (246 m)
- Time zone: UTC-6 (Central (CST))
  - Summer (DST): UTC-5 (CDT)
- ZIP Code: 53138
- Area code: 262
- GNIS feature ID: 1566649

Honey Creek (also Honeycreek) is an unincorporated community located in the town of Spring Prairie, Walworth County, and Rochester, Racine County, both in Wisconsin, United States. The population is approximately 400.

Honey Creek is a small, unincorporated town located 35 miles southwest of Milwaukee. Honey Creek received its name shortly after early settlers arrived because of the hives of bees located along the shores of the small river flowing through the area.

== History ==
The first known non-indigenous settlers in the area were the Hoyts. Gilman Hoyt of Vermont took up a claim in July 1836. He spent most of the summer in Rochester, Wisconsin, then returned in October with Reuben Clark of Michigan. The two men built a hut and wintered on the land. In September 1837, Hoyts' parents, Benjamin and Susan Hayes Hoyt, natives of Deerfield, New Hampshire, came to live in Honey Creek. Two daughters and a son made the journey with them.

Soon after the Hoyts' arrival, the town grew in size so that, in the summer of 1838, the first schoolhouse was built in the area, and in 1849, the first church (a Free Will Baptist Church).

== Notable people ==
- Ginger Beaumont, early Major League baseball player, lived for many years in Honey Creek.
