= Sidney A. Sage =

American businessman, politician (1852–1909)

Sidney A. Sage, Jr. (December 26, 1852 – August 2, 1909) was an American businessman and politician.

Born in Racine, Wisconsin, Sage went to Beloit College. Sage was a hay merchant and dealer in agricultural implements in Corliss, Wisconsin. Sage served in the Wisconsin State Assembly in 1881 and was a Republican. Sage died in Chicago, Illinois where he had been living.
