= Edward F. Rakow =

American politician

Edward F. Rakow (August 30, 1861 – September 2, 1942) was a member of the Wisconsin State Assembly.

== Biography ==
Rakow was born on August 30, 1861, in Burlington, Wisconsin.

== Career ==
Rakow was elected to the Assembly in 1903 in a special election. The special election was needed due to a tie with John H. Kamper in the original election in 1902. Additionally, Rakow was mayor, postmaster, clerk and an alderman of Burlington. He was a Democrat.
