= Norway, Wisconsin =

Town of Norway, Wisconsin
- Town
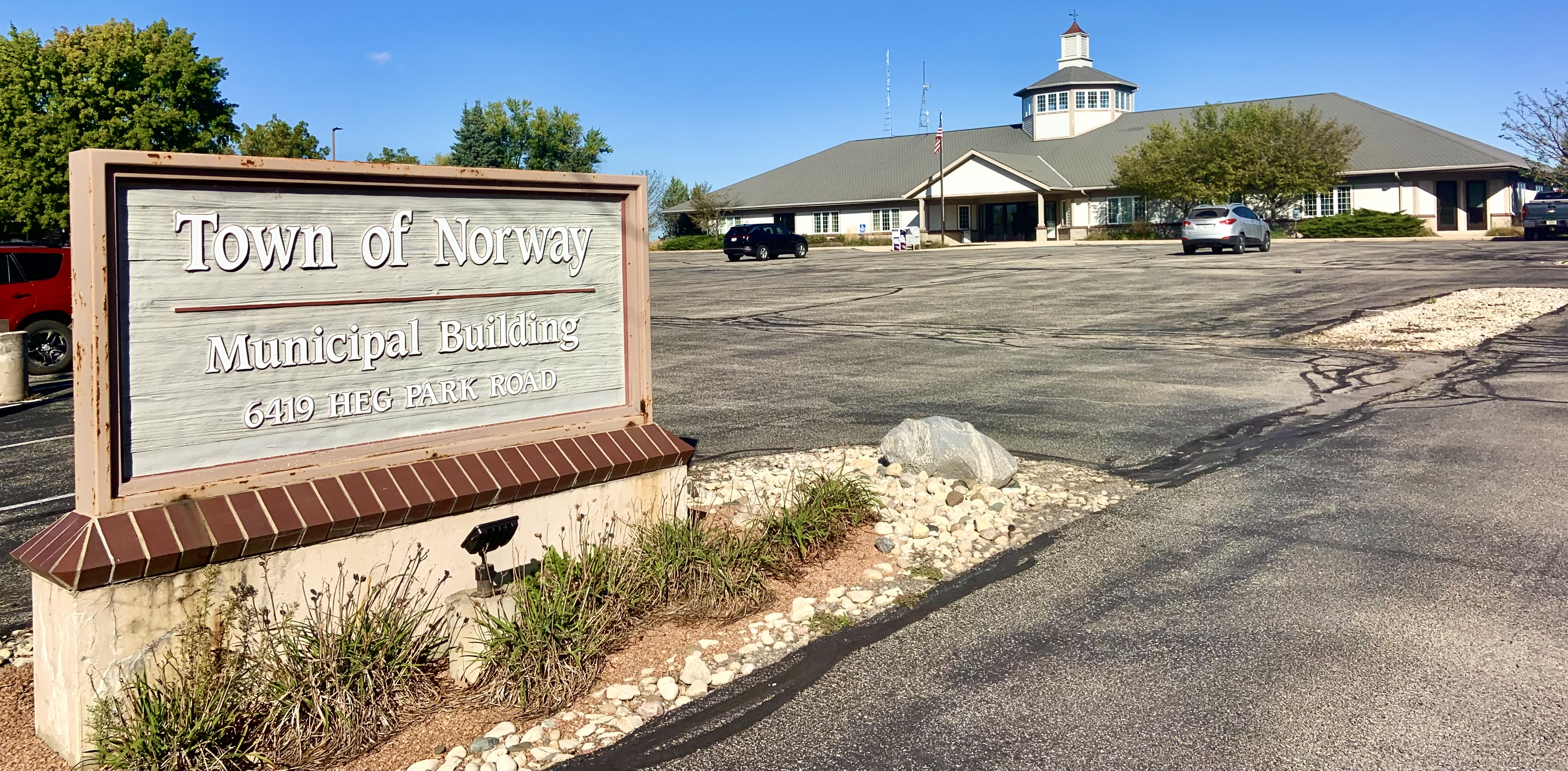
- Town hall in Wind Lake

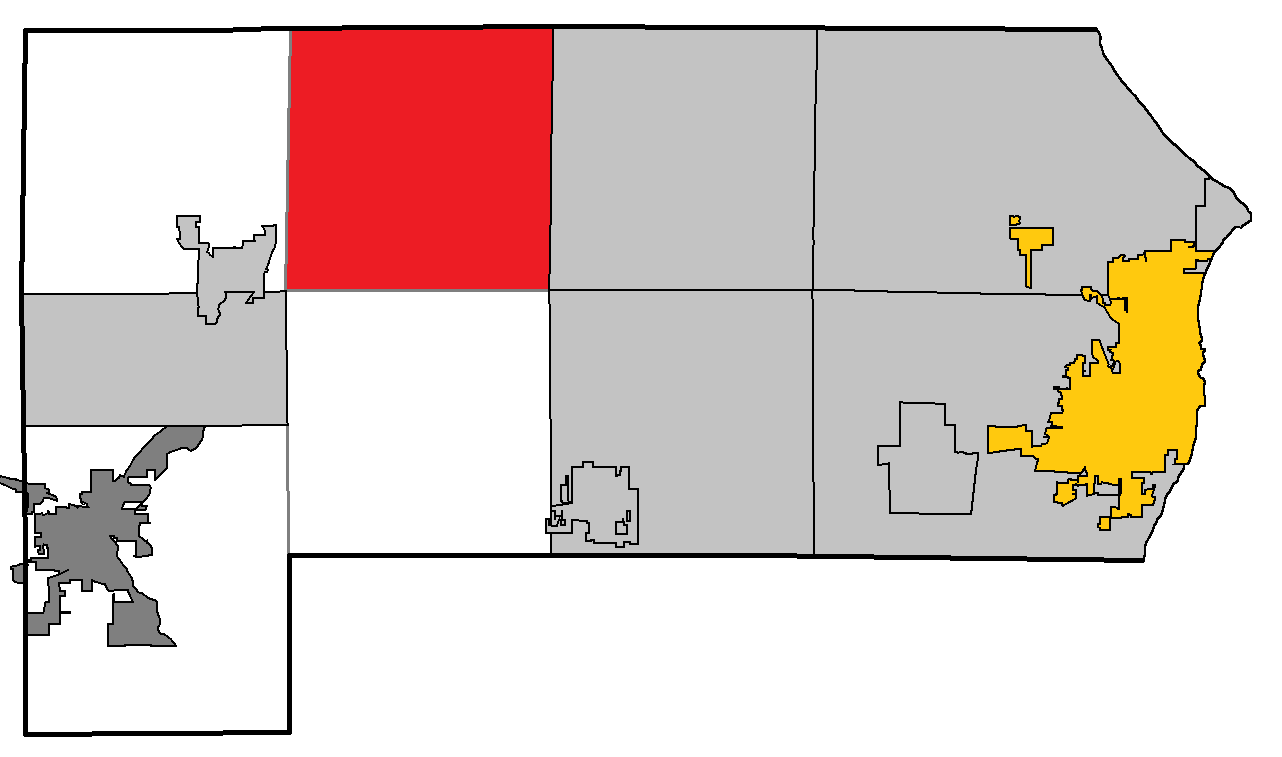
- Location of the Town of Norway, within Racine County
- Coordinates: 42°48′31″N 88°8′54″W
- Country: United States
- State: Wisconsin
- County: Racine

Area
  - Total: 35.6 sq mi (92.3 km^{2})
  - Land: 33.7 sq mi (87.3 km^{2})
  - Water: 1.9 sq mi (5.0 km^{2})
- Elevation: 771 ft (235 m)

Population (2020)
  - Total: 7,916
  - Density: 235/sq mi (90.7/km^{2})
- Time zone: UTC-6 (Central (CST))
  - Summer (DST): UTC-5 (CDT)
- Area code: 262
- FIPS code: 55-58600
- GNIS feature ID: 1583833
- Website: https://www.townofnorwaywi.gov/

The Town of Norway is located in Racine County, Wisconsin, United States. The population was 7,916 at the 2020 census. The census-designated place of Wind Lake is in the town. The unincorporated communities of North Cape and Union Church are also located partially in the town.

== History ==
Muskego Settlement, which was in the town of Norway, was one of the first Norwegian-American settlements.

== Geography ==
According to the United States Census Bureau, the town has a total area of 35.7 square miles (92.3 km^{2}), of which 33.7 square miles (87.3 km^{2}) is land and 1.9 square miles (5.0 km^{2}) (5.41%) is water.

== Demographics ==
As of the census of 2000, there were 7,600 people, 2,641 households, and 2,160 families residing in the town. The population density was 225.4 people per square mile (87.0/km^{2}). There were 2,775 housing units at an average density of 82.3 per square mile (31.8/km^{2}). The racial makeup of the town was 98.16% White, 0.26% African American, 0.38% Native American, 0.22% Asian, 0.04% Pacific Islander, 0.42% from other races, and 0.51% from two or more races. Hispanic or Latino of any race were 1.91% of the population.

There were 2,641 households, out of which 41.6% had children under the age of 18 living with them, 71.5% were married couples living together, 6.1% had a female householder with no husband present, and 18.2% were non-families. 13.8% of all households were made up of individuals, and 4.4% had someone living alone who was 65 years of age or older. The average household size was 2.87 and the average family size was 3.18.

In the town, the population was spread out, with 29.4% under the age of 18, 5.3% from 18 to 24, 33.8% from 25 to 44, 23.1% from 45 to 64, and 8.4% who were 65 years of age or older. The median age was 37 years. For every 100 females, there were 103.4 males. For every 100 females age 18 and over, there were 102.9 males.

The median income for a household in the town was $65,513, and the median income for a family was $71,997. Males had a median income of $45,525 versus $30,494 for females. The per capita income for the town was $24,515. About 1.3% of families and 3.1% of the population were below the poverty line, including 2.5% of those under age 18 and 3.1% of those age 65 or over.

== Notable people ==
- Adam Apple, state legislator
- Joseph F. Bellante, Jr., state legislator
- Patrick Cheves, state legislator
- John Edmund Fries, American football player and coach
- Scott Gunderson, state legislator who owns a farm and house in Norway
- Hans Christian Heg, abolitionist, journalist, anti-slavery activist, politician and soldier
- Henry F. Johnson, state legislator
- W. Grant Nelson, state legislator
- Randolph H. Runden, state legislator
