= Ira A. Rice =

19th century American politician

Member of the Wisconsin State Assembly from the Racine 2nd district
- In office January 3, 1870 – January 2, 1871
- Preceded by: Hiram L. Gilmore
- Succeeded by: George Bremner

Personal details
- Born: September 17, 1812 New Haven, New York, U.S.
- Died: March 23, 1887 (aged 74) Waterford, Wisconsin, U.S.
- Resting place: Oakwood Cemetery, Waterford, Wisconsin
- Party: Republican; Whig (before 1854)
- Spouse: Orilla Caldwell (m. 1837; died 1886)
- Children: John Tyler Rice^{(b. 1839; died 1925)}; Sarah L. (Hulbert)^{(b. 1842; died 1912)}
- Occupation: Farmer

Ira Albert Rice (September 17, 1812 – March 23, 1887) was an American farmer, Republican politician, and Wisconsin pioneer. He served one term in the Wisconsin State Assembly, representing Racine County during the 1870 term. He was one of the founders of the village of Waterford, Wisconsin. His son, John T. Rice, also served in the State Assembly.

== Biography ==
Ira Rice was born in Oswego County, New York, in September 1812. He was raised and educated there, and came west to the Wisconsin Territory at age 23, arriving in May 1836. He claimed a plot of land in what is now the town of Waterford, in northern Racine County. As a pioneer settler, Rice constructed the first bridge over the Fox River in western Racine County. With the assistance of Arad Wells, he plowed the first farmland in the township, planting a crop of red clover. In the early years, he would raise potatoes, rutabaga, wheat, and corn.

He was elected a justice of the peace in the mid-1840s and held the office for 25 years. He was initially involved in politics as a member of the Whig Party, and joined the Republican Party after it was established in 1854. He made his first run for Wisconsin State Assembly in 1858, but lost to Democrat Franklin E. Hoyt.

Rice was particularly active in politics in the lead-up to the 1860 United States presidential election, and was an officer in the local Wide Awakes chapter, supporting the election of Abraham Lincoln.

In 1869, the Republican district convention in Racine County's 2nd Assembly district nominated James L. Coffin. A short time later, Rice entered the race as an independent candidate. He wrote in the Racine Argus that he was accepting the call to run from a number of prominent Racine County residents, including Democrats Nicholas D. Fratt and Nelson R. Norton. The move was met with outrage by the Racine County Republican establishment, declaring Rice a traitor and outcast. With Democratic support and a sufficient number of his Republican friends, Rice prevailed in the general election by 82 votes over Coffin.

Rice was also admitted to the Racine County bar in 1870, after studying law on his own for several years. His primary occupation remained his farming interests, but he would occasionally take clients as a lawyer in his later years.

== Personal life and family ==
Ira A. Rice was the eldest child of Joseph Rice and his wife Hannah (née Fairbanks). The Rice family were descendants of Edmund Rice, a colonist who arrived in the Massachusetts Bay Colony in 1638.

In December 1837, Ira Rice married Orilla Caldwell, the daughter of fellow Waterford settlers Benjamin and Sarah Caldwell. Their marriage was described as the first marriage of Waterford settlers, though the marriage itself took place in Kenosha, Wisconsin. It was the second marriage certificate issued in Racine County (which then comprised all the territory of the present Racine and Kenosha counties). They had two children. Their son, John Tyler Rice, was the first baby born in the town of Rochester, Wisconsin (which then comprised all of the territory of the present towns of Rochester and Waterford).

John T. Rice served as a Union Army officer in the American Civil War with the 15th Wisconsin Infantry Regiment. After the war, he was elected to the Wisconsin State Assembly in the 1877 term.

In his mid-70s, Rice began suffering from progressive paralysis. After his wife's sudden death in 1886, he became depressed and required near constant assistance. In his last months, he was completely bedridden at the home of his son. He died there on March 23, 1887.

== Electoral history ==
=== Wisconsin Assembly (1858) ===
Wisconsin Assembly, Racine County 4th District Election, 1858
Party	Candidate	Votes	%	±%
General Election, November 2, 1858
Democratic	Franklin E. Hoyt	527	55.59%	
Republican	Ira A. Rice	421	44.41%	
Plurality		106	11.18%	
Total votes		948	100.0%	
Democratic gain from Republican				

=== Wisconsin Assembly (1869) ===
Wisconsin Assembly, Racine County 2nd District Election, 1869
Party	Candidate	Votes	%	±%
General Election, November 2, 1869
Independent Republican	Ira A. Rice	1,031	52.07%	
Republican	James L. Coffin	949	47.93%	
Plurality		82	4.14%	
Total votes		1,980	100.0%	
Republican hold				

Wisconsin State Assembly
Preceded by Hiram L. Gilmore	Member of the Wisconsin State Assembly from the Racine 2nd district January 3, 1870 – January 2, 1871	Succeeded by George Bremner
