= Henry Herzog =

American businessman and politician

Henry J. Herzog (March 5, 1848 – February 12, 1935) was an American businessman and politician.

Herzog was born in Germany. In 1849, Herzog and his family emigrated to the United States and settled in Racine, Wisconsin. Herzog was a farmer and lived in the town of Mount Pleasant, Wisconsin and was in the insurance business. He served on the Racine County Board of Supervisors and was president of the county board. Herzog served in the Wisconsin State Assembly in 1915 and 1916 and was a Democrat. Herzog died at his daughter's home in Racine, Wisconsin.
