= Alfred L. Buchan =

American physician and politician

Wisconsin State Assemblyman
- Incumbent
- Assumed office 1889

Personal details
- Born: March 4, 1847 Dover, Racine County, Wisconsin Territory, United States
- Died: February 17, 1905 (aged 57) Dover, Wisconsin
- Party: Republican
- Education: Monmouth College (Illinois) (M.A.); Rush Medical College; Bellevue Hospital and College
- Profession: Physician

Alfred L. Buchan (March 4, 1847 – February 17, 1905) was an American physician and politician serving in the Wisconsin State Assembly.

Born in what is now the town of Dover, Racine County, Wisconsin, Buchan received his Master of Arts degree from Monmouth College and then graduated from Rush Medical College and Bellevue Hospital and College.

He then practiced medicine in Union Grove, Wisconsin and Racine, Wisconsin. In 1889, Buchan served in the Wisconsin State Assembly as a Republican.

Buchan died of cancer in his home in Dover, Wisconsin.
