= Willis Frazell =

American barber and politician

Willis C. Frazell

Member of the Wisconsin State Assembly from the Racine 2nd district
- In office January 12, 1943 – January 8, 1947
- Preceded by: Edward F. Hilker
- Succeeded by: Wallace E. Nield

Member of the Racine County Board of Supervisors
- In office 1940–1946

Personal details
- Born: December 7, 1891 Racine, Wisconsin, U.S.
- Died: January 11, 1958 (aged 66) Racine, Wisconsin, U.S.
- Resting place: Graceland Cemetery, Racine
- Party: Republican

Military service
- Allegiance: United States
- Branch/service: United States Navy
- Battles/wars: World War I

Willis C. Frazell (December 7, 1891 – January 11, 1958) was an American barber and politician.

Born in Racine, Wisconsin, Frazell went to a business college in Racine. He was a barber until retiring in 1951. During World War I, Frazell served in the United States Navy. Frazell served on the Racine County Board of Supervisors from 1940 to 1946 and was a Republican. Frazell served in the Wisconsin State Assembly from 1943 to 1947. Frazell died at his home in Racine.
