= Sturtevant, Wisconsin =

- Village
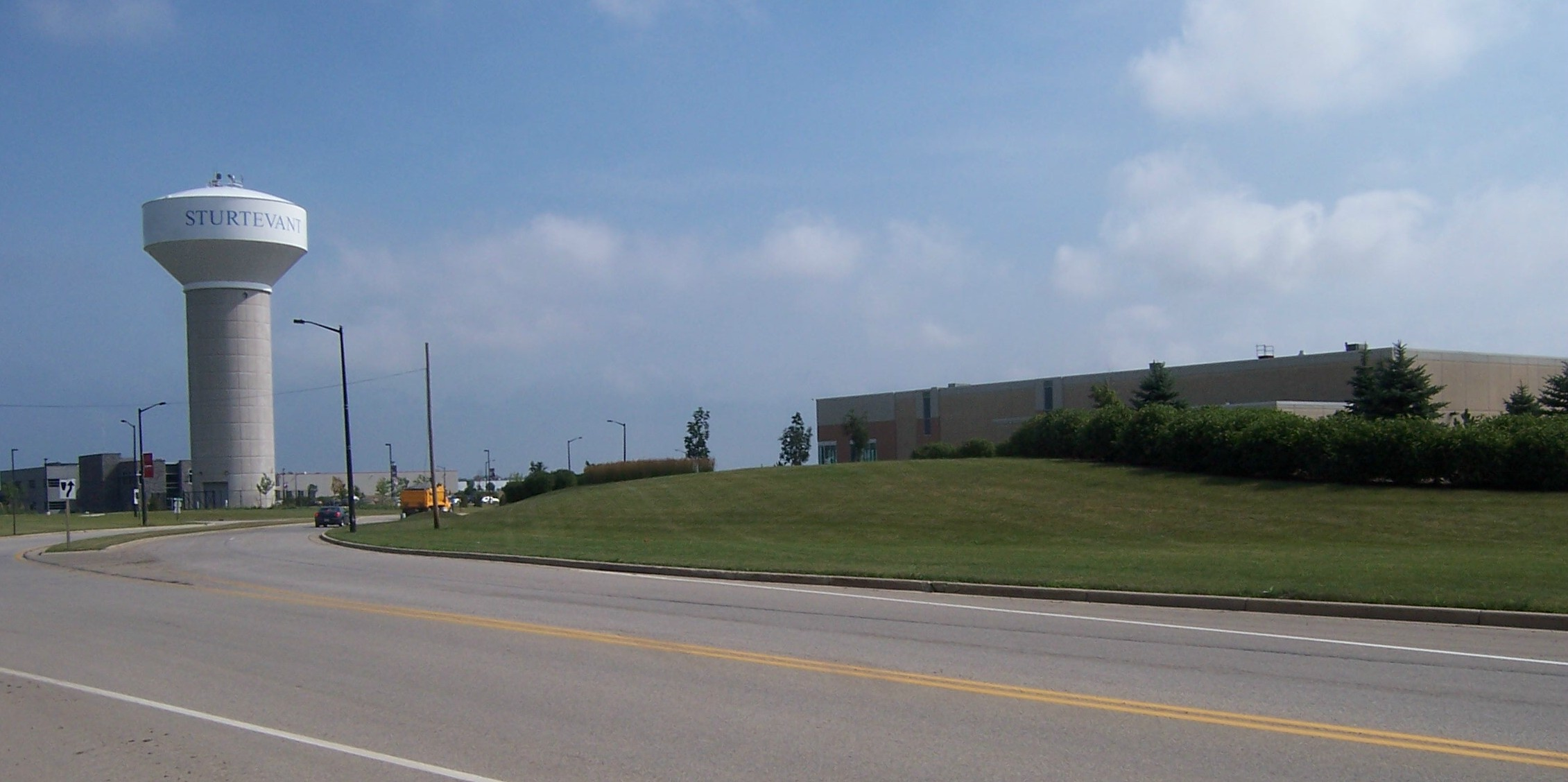
- Sturtevant Water Tower

- Location of Sturtevant in Racine County, Wisconsin.
- Coordinates: 42°41′56″N 87°53′57″W
- Country: United States
- State: Wisconsin
- County: Racine

Area
  - Total: 4.10 sq mi (10.63 km^{2})
  - Land: 4.10 sq mi (10.63 km^{2})
  - Water: 0 sq mi (0.00 km^{2})
- Elevation: 702 ft (214 m)

Population (2020)
  - Total: 6,919
  - Density: 1,620.8/sq mi (625.78/km^{2})
- Time zone: UTC-6 (Central (CST))
  - Summer (DST): UTC-5 (CDT)
- ZIP Code: 53177
- Area code: 262
- FIPS code: 55-77925
- GNIS feature ID: 1575001
- Website: www.sturtevant-wi.gov

Sturtevant is a village in Racine County, Wisconsin, United States. The population was 6,919 at the 2020 census.

== History ==
Sturtevant was originally known as Parkersville, after the Parker family, early settlers in the area. Other former names for Sturtevant are Western Union Junction and Corliss. The name Corliss referred to the Brown Corliss Engine Company of Milwaukee. The name Sturtevant was selected in 1923, when the Massachusetts-based B. F. Sturtevant Company opened a plant.

== Geography ==
Sturtevant is located at 42°41′56″N 87°53′57″W (42.698819, -87.899202).

According to the United States Census Bureau, the village has a total area of 4.19 square miles (10.85 km^{2}), all land.

== Demographics ==
Historical population
Census	Pop.	Note	%±
1910	525		—
1920	564		7.4%
1930	746		32.3%
1940	803		7.6%
1950	1,176		46.5%
1960	1,488		26.5%
1970	3,376		126.9%
1980	4,130		22.3%
1990	3,803		−7.9%
2000	5,287		39.0%
2010	6,970		31.8%
2020	6,919		−0.7%
U.S. Decennial Census

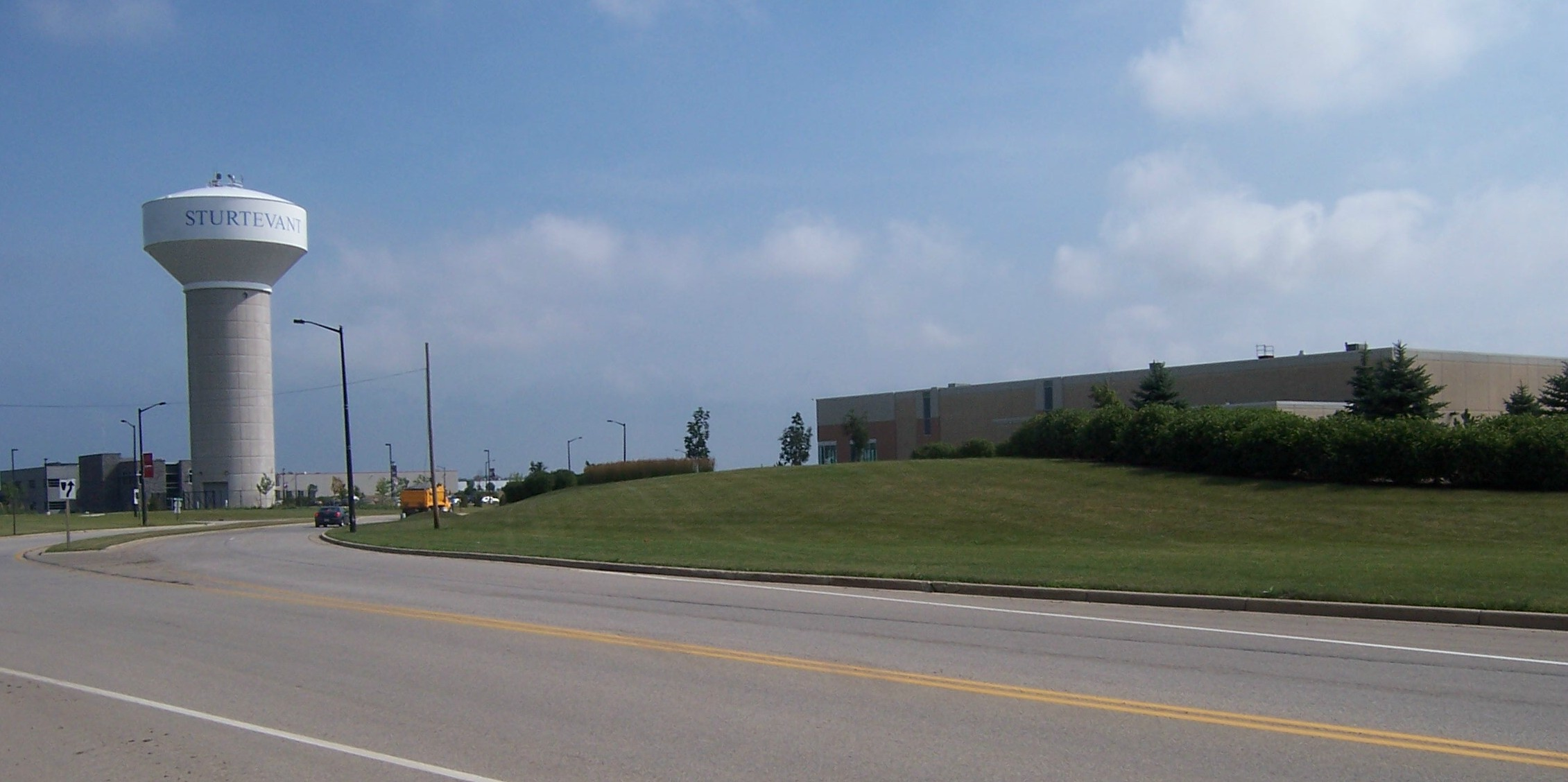
Distribution warehouses are a common sight along the western side of Sturtevant

=== 2010 census ===
As of the census of 2010, there were 6,970 people, 2,103 households, and 1,373 families living in the village. The population density was 1,663.5 inhabitants per square mile (642.3/km^{2}). There were 2,240 housing units at an average density of 534.6 per square mile (206.4/km^{2}). The racial makeup of the village was 78.8% White, 15.9% African American, 0.7% Native American, 1.0% Asian, 1.3% from other races, and 2.2% from two or more races. Hispanic or Latino of any race were 6.1% of the population.

There were 2,103 households, of which 32.2% had children under the age of 18 living with them, 47.1% were married couples living together, 12.2% had a female householder with no husband present, 6.0% had a male householder with no wife present, and 34.7% were non-families. 28.2% of all households were made up of individuals, and 10% had someone living alone who was 65 years of age or older. The average household size was 2.44 and the average family size was 2.99.

The median age in the village was 35.8 years. 18.1% of residents were under the age of 18; 9.7% were between the ages of 18 and 24; 37.8% were from 25 to 44; 25.6% were from 45 to 64; and 8.8% were 65 years of age or older. The gender makeup of the village was 61.7% male and 38.3% female.

=== 2000 census ===
As of the census of 2000, there were 5,287 people, 1,477 households, and 1,057 families living in the village. The population density was 1,717.7 people per square mile (662.8/km^{2}). There were 1,521 housing units at an average density of 494.2 per square mile (190.7/km^{2}). The racial makeup of the village was 80.25% White, 15.79% African American, 1.15% Native American, 0.40% Asian, 0.21% Pacific Islander, 0.83% from other races, and 1.36% from two or more races. Hispanic or Latino of any race were 5.73% of the population.

There were 1,477 households, out of which 36.6% had children under the age of 18 living with them, 54.0% were married couples living together, 12.3% had a female householder with no husband present, and 28.4% were non-families. 22.3% of all households were made up of individuals, and 6.9% had someone living alone who was 65 years of age or older. The average household size was 2.62 and the average family size was 3.06.

In the village, the population was spread out, with 20.0% under the age of 18, 12.9% from 18 to 24, 40.7% from 25 to 44, 19.8% from 45 to 64, and 6.7% who were 65 years of age or older. The median age was 34 years. For every 100 females, there were 180.0 males. For every 100 females age 18 and over, there were 205.6 males.

The median income for a household in the village was $51,492, and the median income for a family was $56,563. Males had a median income of $37,273 versus $27,009 for females. The per capita income for the village was $16,093. About 3.8% of families and 6.4% of the population were below the poverty line, including 8.3% of those under age 18 and 11.4% of those age 65 or over.

== Government ==
The Village of Sturtevant is governed by a six-member board and a village president. The village is policed by Racine county sheriff department as of December 2025.

== Commerce ==
The largest employer in Sturtevant is Ruud Lighting, a subsidiary CREE. Other top employers include BRP US Inc., Andis Company and the Wisconsin Department of Corrections.

== Transportation ==
=== Railways ===
Sturtevant was a junction between two main lines of the Chicago, Milwaukee, St. Paul and Pacific Railroad, better known as the Milwaukee Road. The Chicago & Milwaukee (C&M) line ran north–south and the Racine & Southwestern Line (Southwestern Line) ran east–west. In 1985 the Canadian Pacific Railway, through its subsidiary Soo Line, acquired the Milwaukee Road and continued operation over these tracks. Service on the former Southwestern Line goes west only as far as Kansasville. Amtrak also passes through Sturtevant, serving Racine, Kenosha and the southern Milwaukee suburbs from a station on Wisconsin Highway 20 to the north.

=== Airport ===
Sturtevant is served by the Sylvania Airport (C89).

== Education ==
Sturtevant is part of the Racine Unified School District. Most areas are zoned to Schulte Elementary School, while some are zoned to West Ridge Elementary School. All residents are zoned to Mitchell K-8 School and Case High School.

== Sturtevant Transitional Facility ==
The 300-bed Wisconsin Department of Corrections Sturtevant Transitional Facility (STF), designed to provide offender reintegration to the community and accountability for offenders, provides Alternatives to Revocation (ATR), Work Release, and Community Service programs, and acts as a holding facility, similar to a county jail. STF has two security levels, minimum and maximum, with a 150-bed capacity each.

== Points of interest ==
- Western Union Junction Railroad Museum
- Sturtevant Amtrak Station
