= John Bosustow =

American politician

John Bosustow (December 28, 1817 – July 25, 1880) was an American politician.

Born in Paul, Cornwall, United Kingdom of Great Britain and Ireland, Bosustow settled in Yorkville, Wisconsin Territory, US. He served on the Racine County, Wisconsin Board of Supervisors and was chairman. In 1880, Bosustow served in the Wisconsin State Assembly. He died in Yorkville, Wisconsin in 1880 while still in office.
