= North Cape, Wisconsin =

NorthCape
- Unincorporated community
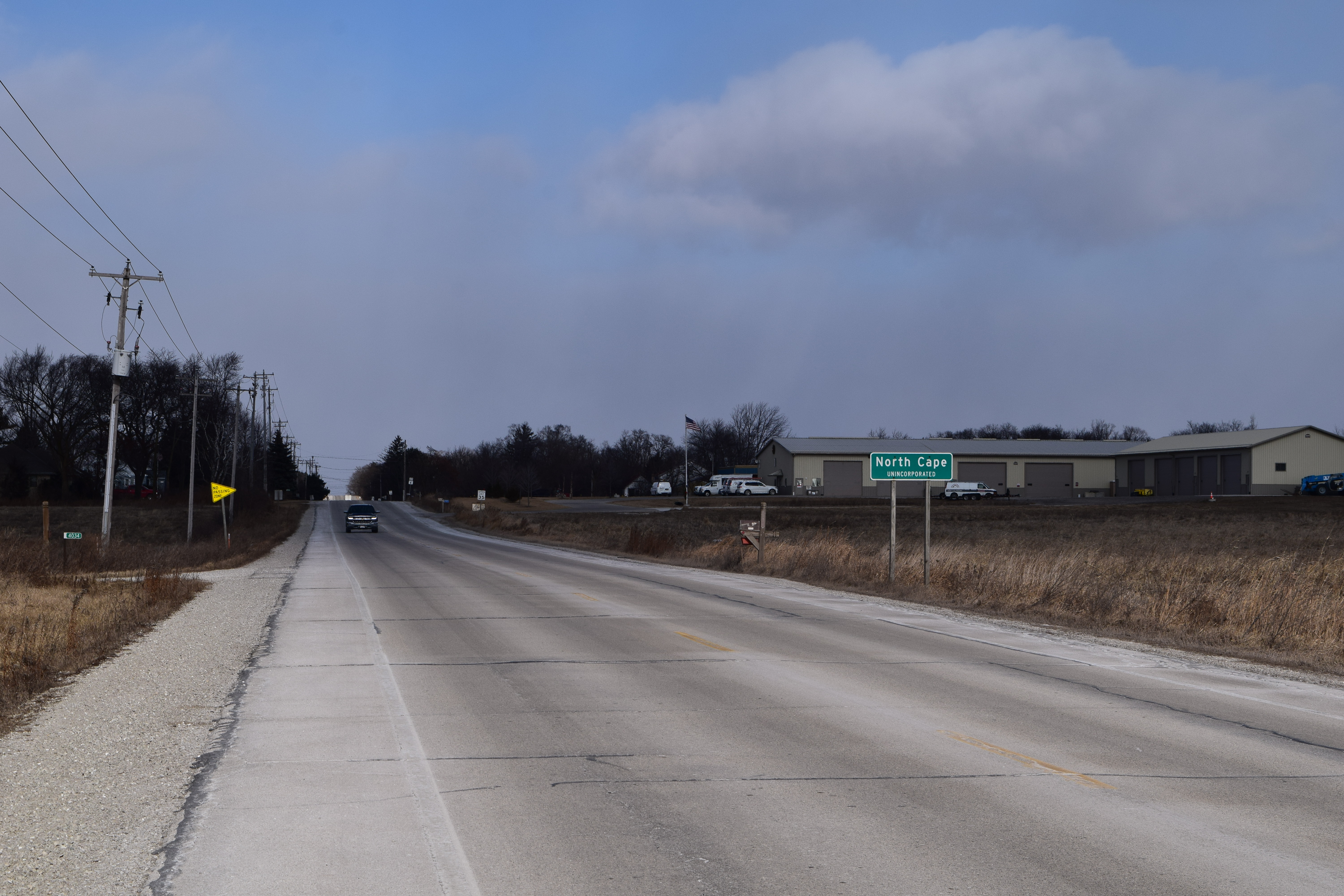
- Looking north at North Cape on US 45

- Location within the state of Wisconsin
- Coordinates: 42°46′43″N 88°04′15″W
- Country: United States
- State: Wisconsin
- County: Racine
- Time zone: UTC-6 (Central (CST))
  - Summer (DST): UTC-5 (CDT)
- Area code: 262

North Cape (also Northcape) is an unincorporated community in the towns of Norway and Raymond, in Racine County, Wisconsin, United States.

== Notable person ==
Adam Apple (1831–1905), a politician, lived on a farm in North Cape.
