= William Vail Moore =

American politician

William Vail Moore was an American politician. He was a member of the Wisconsin State Assembly.

== Biography ==
Moore was born on January 15, 1818, in Minisink, New York. He moved to what is now Yorkville, Wisconsin. There, he was a farmer by trade.

== Political career ==
Moore was a member of the Assembly during the 1872 session. Previously, he had been an unsuccessful candidate for the Assembly in 1858. Other positions Moore held include County Treasurer of Racine County, Wisconsin. He was a Republican.
