= Yorkville, Wisconsin =

- Village
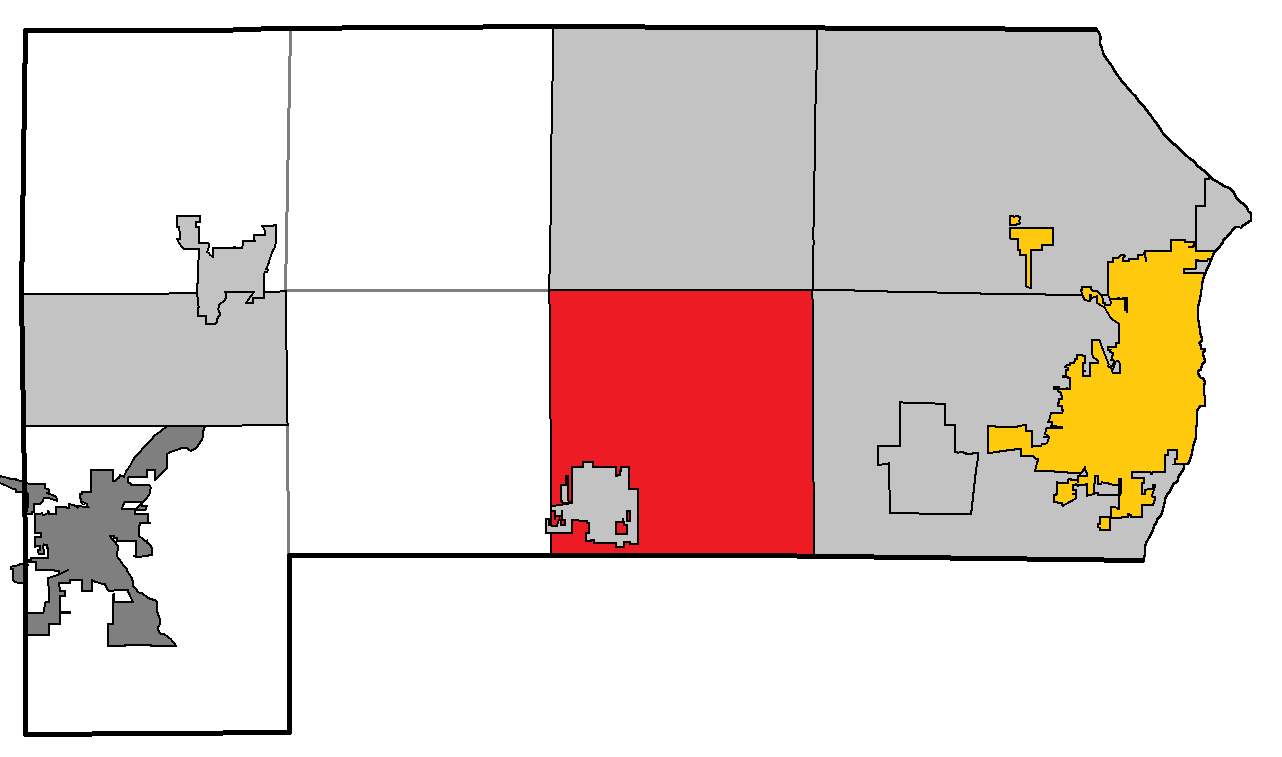
- Location of Yorkville, within Racine County, Wisconsin
- Coordinates: 42°42′26″N 87°59′52″W
- Country: United States
- State: Wisconsin
- County: Racine

Area
  - Total: 33.61 sq mi (87.05 km^{2})
  - Land: 33.49 sq mi (86.74 km^{2})
  - Water: 0.12 sq mi (0.31 km^{2})
- Elevation: 709 ft (216 m)

Population (2020)
  - Total: 3,246
  - Density: 93.5/sq mi (36.09/km^{2})
- Time zone: UTC-6 (Central (CST))
  - Summer (DST): UTC-5 (CDT)
- Area code: 262
- FIPS code: 55-89575
- GNIS feature ID: 1584495

Yorkville is a village and former town in Racine County, Wisconsin, United States. The population was 3,246 at the 2020 census. The unincorporated communities of Ives Grove, Sylvania, and Yorkville are located in the town.

== History ==
The town was founded primarily by farmers immigrating from Cornwall, England.

== Geography ==
According to the United States Census Bureau, the town has a total area of 34.4 square miles (89.0 km^{2}), of which 34.3 square miles (88.9 km^{2}) is land and 0.04 square mile (0.1 km^{2}) (0.09%) is water.

== Demographics ==
Historical population
Census	Pop.	Note	%±
2000	3,291		—
2010	3,071		−6.7%
2020	3,246		5.7%
U.S. Decennial Census

As of the census of 2000, there were 3,291 people, 1,123 households, and 917 families residing in the town. The population density was 95.9 people per square mile (37.0/km^{2}). There were 1,153 housing units at an average density of 33.6 per square mile (13.0/km^{2}). The racial makeup of the town was 98.12% White, 0.24% African American, 0.15% Native American, 0.33% Asian, 0.24% from other races, and 0.91% from two or more races. Hispanic or Latino of any race were 1.43% of the population.

There were 1,123 households, out of which 35.2% had children under the age of 18 living with them, 70.9% were married couples living together, 6.9% had a female householder with no husband present, and 18.3% were non-families. 14.8% of all households were made up of individuals, and 4.5% had someone living alone who was 65 years of age or older. The average household size was 2.75 and the average family size was 3.05.

In the town, the population was spread out, with 24.4% under the age of 18, 5.9% from 18 to 24, 31.0% from 25 to 44, 28.9% from 45 to 64, and 9.8% who were 65 years of age or older. The median age was 40 years. For every 100 females, there were 103.3 males. For every 100 females age 18 and over, there were 103.0 males.

The median income for a household in the town was $62,076, and the median income for a family was $63,867. Males had a median income of $46,232 versus $29,500 for females. The per capita income for the town was $23,895. About 2.3% of families and 6.9% of the population were below the poverty line, including 2.2% of those under age 18 and 5.2% of those age 65 or over.

== Education ==
Yorkville Elementary School is a K–8 school with a staff of 47.

== Notable people ==
- John Bosustow, member of the Wisconsin State Assembly
- Emmy Fink, TV personality
- William Vail Moore, member of the Wisconsin State Assembly
