= Joseph C. Hamata =

American businessman and politician

Joseph C. Hamata (February 15, 1882 – May 26, 1951) was an American businessman and politician. He was a member of the Wisconsin State Assembly from 1913–1915 and 1933–1937.

Born in Racine, Wisconsin, Hamata owned a retail grocery business. He was also Secretary of the Racine Aerie of Eagles. Hamata served on the Racine School Board and was a Democrat. Hamata also served on the local draft board and was deputy collector of customs of the Port of Racine. From 1913 to 1915 and from 1933 to 1937, Hamata served in the Wisconsin State Assembly. Hamata died of a heart attack at age 69 while at his summer home in Kenora, Ontario, Canada.
