= Gerald T. Flynn =

20th century American politician

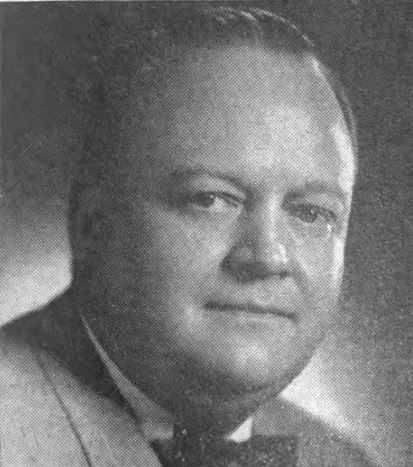

Member of the U.S. House of Representatives from Wisconsin's 1st district
- In office January 3, 1959 – January 3, 1961
- Preceded by: Lawrence H. Smith
- Succeeded by: Henry Schadeberg

Member of the Wisconsin Senate from the 21st district
- In office January 1, 1951 – January 3, 1955
- Preceded by: Edward F. Hilker
- Succeeded by: Lynn E. Stalbaum

Personal details
- Born: October 7, 1910 Mount Pleasant, Wisconsin, U.S.
- Died: May 14, 1990 (aged 79) Racine, Wisconsin, U.S.
- Resting place: Holy Cross Catholic Cemetery, Racine
- Party: Democratic
- Spouse: Mary C. McAvoy (m. 1938; died 1990)
- Children: 4 (including Dennis J. Flynn)
- Education: Marquette Law School (LL.B.)

Gerald Thomas Flynn (October 7, 1910 – May 14, 1990) was an American lawyer and Democratic politician from Racine, Wisconsin. He served one term in the U.S. House of Representatives, representing Wisconsin's 1st congressional district during the 86th United States Congress (1959–1961). He previously served four years in the Wisconsin Senate, representing Racine County.

== Early life ==
Born on a farm in Mount Pleasant, Wisconsin, near the city of Racine, Flynn attended a rural grade school and graduated from St. Catherine's High School in 1928. He went on to attend Marquette University Law School, where he earned his LL.B. in 1933. He was admitted to the bar later that year and immediately began practicing law in the city of Racine.

== Legal and political career ==
As a student, he was already active with the Democratic Party of Wisconsin, and was selected chairman of the Young Democrats club of Racine around the time he opened his law practice. His legal work often intersected with his political advocacy, and he often represented local unions. He was selected as a delegate to the Democratic National Conventions in 1940, 1944, 1948, 1952, 1956, and 1960.

He first stood for election to office in 1950, when he ran as the Democratic nominee for Wisconsin Senate in the 21st State Senate district. He narrowly defeated former state representative Randolph H. Runden in the general election and went on to represent Racine County in the 1951 and 1953 sessions.

Flynn decided that the demands of being a state legislator took too much of his time away from his legal practice, and announced that he would not run for another term in 1954. Two years later, however, he decided to seek elected office again, running for United States House of Representatives, challenging then-eight term incumbent Republican congressman Lawrence H. Smith in Wisconsin's 1st congressional district. He defeated perennial candidate Kenosha engineer Erling Johnson in the Democratic primary, but lost to Smith in the general election. Although he only received 43% of the vote, he earned more votes than any previous Democratic candidate in the history of the district.

Congressman Lawrence Smith died a year into his ninth term, in January 1958, and Flynn decided to run again for the first congressional district, which would then be an open seat in the 1958 election. He faced another competitive primary—this time against fellow attorney Sverre Roang, of Edgerton, Wisconsin—but managed to prevail with strong support from Racine and Kenosha counties. Flynn went on to face congressman Lawrence Smith's widow, Eleanor Smith, in the general election. Flynn won a close victory with 50.6% of the vote, becoming the first Democrat in 68 years to win an election in Wisconsin's 1st congressional district.

Flynn represented the 1st congressional district in the 86th United States Congress (January 3, 1959 – January 3, 1961). His voting record in congress closely aligned with union labor preferences, he voted in the minority against the Labor Management Reporting and Disclosure Act of 1959, at both a critical amendment and a final vote. He also voted against some in his party, voting for the Civil Rights Act of 1960, including the more controversial voting rights provision in the bill.

He ran for re-election in 1960. His opponent in that election was Burlington congregational church minister Henry C. Schadeberg. Schadeberg was considered a political unknown, but was popular from years of church and civic engagement, and was assisted by the district's natural Republican majority. Schadeberg prevailed in the general election with 53% of the vote, but Flynn still managed his largest vote total yet, about 16,000 more than he had received in 1956.

Flynn decided to make a bid to return to office in 1962. He faced a competitive primary, but managed to prevail with 51% over his two Democratic opponents. The result of the general election rematch, however, was almost identical to 1960, with Schadeberg again prevailing with about 53% of the vote.

Flynn made two more attempts to run for Congress, but lost in the primary in both 1964 and 1970. Flynn did not run for office again after coming in a distant third in the 1970 Democratic primary behind educator Les Aspin and Earth Day organizer Doug La Follette.

Although he never ran for office again, Flynn and his wife remained active members of the Democratic Party and supported many other candidates, including former Flynn campaign staffer Marcel Dandeneau, who represented the Racine area in the Assembly in the 1970s and served as chairman of the Racine County Democratic Party for years after.

Flynn also continued to work as a lawyer until his death. He collapsed in the courtroom of Wisconsin circuit judge Emmanuel J. Vuvunas during a trial and died at Racine's St. Luke's Hospital later that day.

== Personal life and family ==
Gerald T. Flynn was the youngest of seven children born to Irish American immigrant John Flynn and his wife Margaret (née Williams) Flynn.

Gerald Flynn married Racine public school teacher Mary Cecilia McAvoy at St. Patrick's Church in Racine, on August 3, 1938. McAvoy was active with the teachers union and was a long-time member of the leadership of the Racine County Democratic Party. They had two daughters and two sons together and were married for 51 years before her death in January 1990. Gerald Flynn died just four months later. At the time of his death, he had 14 grandchildren. In addition to his legal and political career, Flynn was active in the Catholic community as a member of the Society of the Holy Name and the Knights of Columbus.

Their elder son, Dennis J. Flynn, also became a lawyer and Wisconsin circuit judge in Racine.

== Electoral history ==
=== Wisconsin Senate (1950) ===
Year	Election	Date	Elected				Defeated				Total	Plurality
1950	General	Nov. 4	Gerald T. Flynn	Democratic	20,240	50.34%	Randolph H. Runden	Rep.	19,963	49.66%	40,203	277

=== U.S. House (1956–1962) ===
Year	Election	Date	Elected				Defeated				Total	Plurality
1956	Primary	Sep. 11	Gerald T. Flynn	Democratic	17,844	64.74%	Erling E. Johnson	Dem.	9,718	35.26%	27,562	8,126
1956	General	Nov. 6	Lawrence H. Smith (inc)	Republican	94,882	57.07%	Gerald T. Flynn	Dem.	71,379	42.93%	166,261	23,503
1958	Primary	Sep. 9	Gerald T. Flynn	Democratic	21,755	76.91%	Svarre Roang	Dem.	6,532	23.09%	28,287	15,223
1958	General	Nov. 4	Gerald T. Flynn	Democratic	63,065	50.58%	Eleanor J. Smith	Rep.	61,615	49.42%	124,680	1,450
1960	General	Nov. 8	Henry C. Schadeberg	Republican	97,662	52.70%	Gerald T. Flynn (inc)	Dem.	87,646	47.30%	185,308	10,016
1962	Primary	Sep. 11	Gerald T. Flynn	Democratic	13,629	51.31%	Jay Schwartz	Dem.	10,098	38.02%	26,563	3,531
1962	Primary	Sep. 11	Gerald T. Flynn	Democratic	13,629	51.31%	Eleanora Wickstrom	Dem.	2,836	10.68%	26,563	3,531
1962	General	Nov. 6	Henry C. Schadeberg (inc)	Republican	71,657	53.29%	Gerald T. Flynn	Dem.	62,800	46.71%	134,457	8,857
1964	Primary	Sep. 8	Lynn E. Stalbaum	Democratic	20,293	55.44%	Gerald T. Flynn	Dem.	16,310	44.56%	36,603	3,983

=== U.S. House (1970) ===
Year	Election	Date	Elected				Defeated				Total	Plurality
1970	Primary	Sep. 8	Les Aspin	Democratic	15,185	39.83%	Doug La Follette	Dem.	15,165	39.78%	38,124	20
1970	Primary	Sep. 8	Les Aspin	Democratic	15,185	39.83%	Gerald T. Flynn	Dem.	6,130	16.08%	38,124	20
1970	Primary	Sep. 8	Les Aspin	Democratic	15,185	39.83%	Perry J. Anderson	Dem.	1,644	4.31%	38,124	20

Wisconsin Senate
Preceded by Edward F. Hilker	Member of the Wisconsin Senate from the 21st district January 1, 1951 – January 3, 1955	Succeeded by Lynn E. Stalbaum
U.S. House of Representatives
Preceded by Lawrence H. Smith	Member of the U.S. House of Representatives from Wisconsin's 1st congressional district January 3, 1959 – January 3, 1961	Succeeded by Henry C. Schadeberg
