= Merrill E. Stalbaum =

20th century American politician

Member of the Wisconsin State Assembly from the Racine 3rd district
- In office January 2, 1961 – January 1, 1973
- Preceded by: John R. Hansen
- Succeeded by: District abolished

Personal details
- Born: April 24, 1911 Norway, Wisconsin, U.S.
- Died: August 30, 1999 (aged 88) Burlington Memorial Hospital, Burlington, Wisconsin, U.S.
- Resting place: Norway Cemetery, Norway, Wisconsin
- Party: Republican
- Spouse: Lucille Anna Hanson (m. 1944; died 1998)
- Children: 1
- Relatives: Lynn E. Stalbaum (brother)

Merrill Emmet Stalbaum (April 24, 1911 – August 30, 1999) was an American farmer, surveyor, and Republican politician from Racine County, Wisconsin. He served six terms in the Wisconsin State Assembly, representing Racine County from 1961 to 1973. His younger brother, Lynn E. Stalbaum, was a Wisconsin state senator and served one term in the U.S. House of Representatives.

== Biography ==
Merrill E. Stalbaum was born on his family's farm in the town of Norway, Wisconsin, in Racine County. He lived nearly his entire life in the town of Norway, attending the Hill Crest primary school, the Rochester Agricultural School, and then graduating from Waterford High School. He worked on his family farm and also trained as a land surveyor.

In 1937, he was elected clerk of the town of Norway, and was retained in that office for the next 30 years. He was also appointed to the County School Committee by the County Board, and served on that body from 1948 to 1960, during a significant reorganization of the Racine County school districts. During these years he was also active in a number of community organizations, including a local farm insurance company and the Agricultural Stabilization and Conservation Committee.

In 1960, Stalbaum was a candidate for Wisconsin State Assembly in Racine County's 3rd Assembly district. The district then comprised all of the county outside of the city of Racine. He ran on the Republican Party ticket, challenging Democratic incumbent John R. Hansen. In the November 1960 general election, Stalbaum narrowly prevailed over Hansen, receiving 51.5% of the vote. Stalbaum would go on to win re-election five times, serving continuously until 1973.

The 1972 redistricting was the first to liberate districts from the county boundaries, and Stalbaum's Racine County district was divided between three new districts. Rather than running for election in the new district which contained his home, the 43rd Assembly district, he instead chose to enter the race for United States House of Representatives, challenging first term incumbent Democrat Les Aspin. Stalbaum faced a crowded Republican primary field, but managed to prevail with 43% over his three opponents. Aspin easily prevailed in the general election, however, with Stalbaum earning just 35% of the vote.

Stalbaum largely retired from politics after the 1972 election, but remained active in the community and the Norway Lutheran Church.

== Personal life and family ==
Merrill Stalbaum was the eldest of three children born to John Martin and Amanda (née Ebert) Stalbaum. Both parents were natives of Wisconsin, and the Stalbaum farm had belonged to the family since 1854. Merrill's younger brother, Lynn E. Stalbaum, also served in the Wisconsin Legislature as a member of the Wisconsin Senate and overlapped with Merrill Stalbaum's service during the 1961 and 1963 legislative sessions, making them the only siblings to serve together in the Wisconsin Legislature until Scott and Jeff Fitzgerald in 2001–2013. Unlike the Fitzgerald brothers, Merrill and Lynn Stalbaum had opposing political beliefs and often clashed. Lynn Stalbaum also went on to serve one term in the United States House of Representatives in the 1965–1966 term.

Merrill Stalbaum married Lucille Anna Hanson on July 15, 1944. They had one son, John, and were married for 44 years before her death in 1998.

Merrill Stalbaum died at Burlington Memorial Hospital in Burlington, Wisconsin, on August 30, 1999, after a short illness.

== Electoral history ==
=== Wisconsin Assembly (1960–1970) ===
Year	Election	Date	Elected				Defeated				Total	Plurality
1960	General	Nov. 8	Merrill E. Stalbaum	Republican	10,130	51.52%	John R. Hansen (inc)	Dem.	9,532	48.48%	19,662	598
1962	General	Nov. 6	Merrill E. Stalbaum (inc)	Republican	8,486	55.62%	Ray S. Kamper	Dem.	6,770	44.38%	15,256	1,716
1964	General	Nov. 3	Merrill E. Stalbaum (inc)	Republican	8,444	54.41%	Ray S. Kamper	Dem.	7,075	45.59%	15,519	1,369
1966	General	Nov. 8	Merrill E. Stalbaum (inc)	Republican	7,053	63.53%	Ray S. Kamper	Dem.	4,049	36.47%	11,102	3,004
1968	General	Nov. 5	Merrill E. Stalbaum (inc)	Republican	12,105	100.0%					12,105	12,105
1970	General	Nov. 3	Merrill E. Stalbaum (inc)	Republican	8,025	57.21%	George H. Iverson	Dem.	6,003	42.79%	14,028	2,022

=== U.S. House (1972) ===
Wisconsin's 1st Congressional District Election, 1972
Party	Candidate	Votes	%	±%
Republican Primary, September 12, 1972
Republican	Merrill E. Stalbaum	12,451	43.26%	
Republican	Charles Coleman	7,129	24.77%	
Republican	David B. Grimm	6,273	21.79%	
Republican	Garth Seehawer	2,930	10.18%	
Plurality		5,322	18.49%	
Total votes		28,783	100.0%	
General Election, November 7, 1972
Democratic	Les Aspin (incumbent)	122,973	64.41%	+3.48pp
Republican	Merrill E. Stalbaum	66,665	34.91%	−4.16pp
American	Charles J. Fortner	1,299	0.68%	
Plurality		56,308	29.49%	+7.64pp
Total votes		190,937	100.0%	+33.06%
Democratic hold				

Wisconsin State Assembly
Preceded by John R. Hansen	Member of the Wisconsin State Assembly from the Racine 3rd district January 2, 1961 – January 1, 1973	District abolished
