= Eugene Young =

Eugene Young may refer to:

- Snooky Young (Eugene Edward Young), American jazz trumpeter
- Eugene Young (character), a character from the American legal drama The Practice
- Eugene S. Young, American diplomat
- Eugene "Scrapiron" Young, author, professional trainer, coach, and attorney
- E. F. Young Jr. (Eugene Fred Young Jr.), American businessman
