= St. Catherine's High School (Racine, Wisconsin) =

Private, coeducational school in Racine, Wisconsin, United States

Racine St. Catherine's
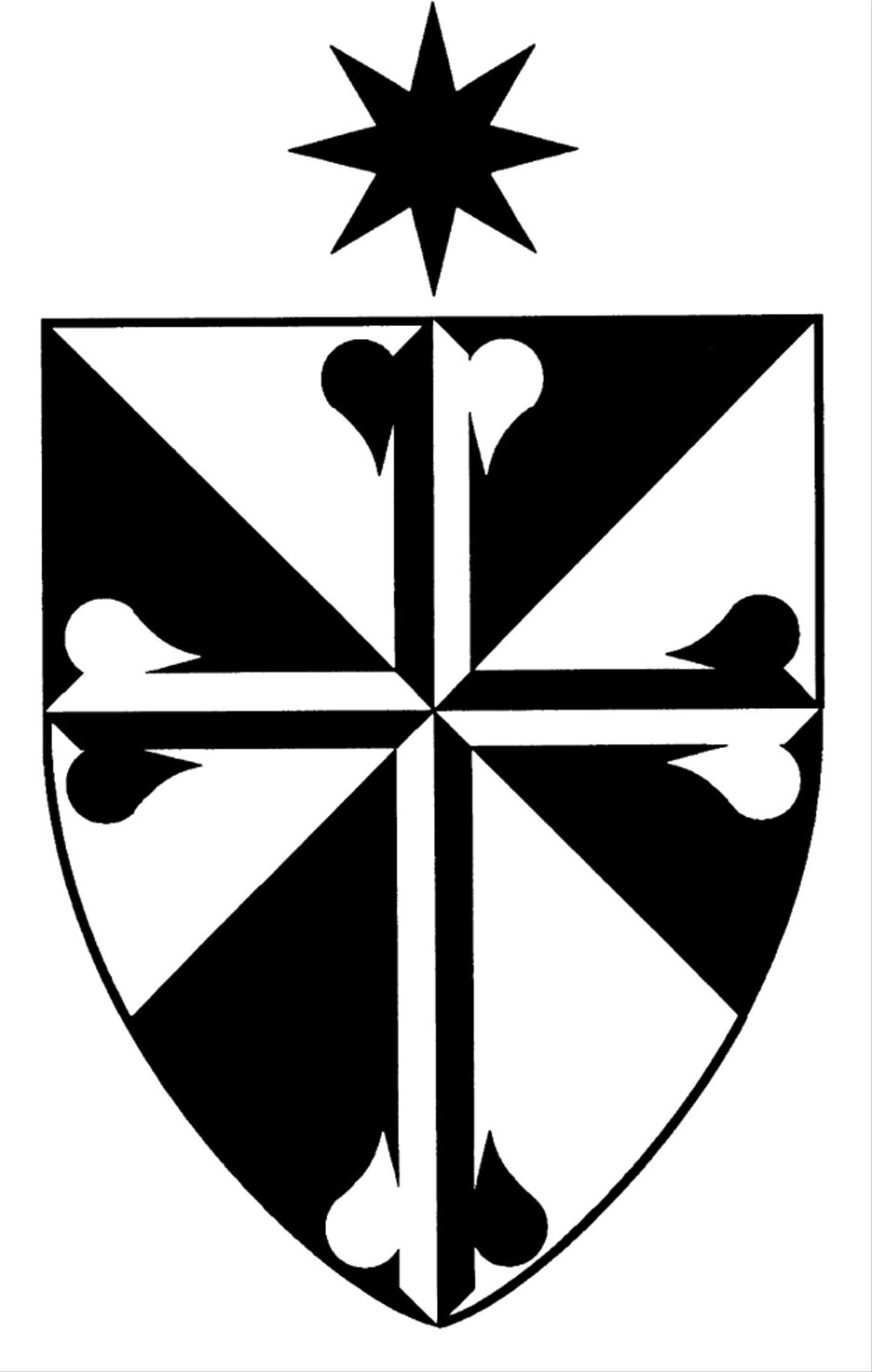

Location
- 1200 Park Avenue; Racine, (Racine County), Wisconsin 53403; United States; 42°43′6″N 87°47′11″W

Information
- Type: Private
- Motto: "Veritas" – "We Seek the Truth" “Laudare, Benedicere, Praedicare” – to praise, to bless, and to preach.
- Religious affiliation: Dominican
- Denomination: Roman Catholic
- Patron saint: Saint Catherine of Siena
- Established: 1864
- Founder: Sister Maria Benedicta Bauer
- School board: Siena Catholic Schools of Racine, Inc.
- Grades: 9–12
- Gender: Coed
- Average class size: 21
- Education system: Unweighted GPA
- Hours in school day: 7
- Colors: Black, white, gold
- Song: "Alma Mater" Alma Mater hear our singing St. Catherine's High. Loyalty to you we're bringing St. Catherine's High. To your loving breast you caught us, To the founts of truth you've brought us, How to live and die you've taught us, St. Catherine's High. Alma Mater, hear our praising, St. Catherine's High. Loud our voice in chorus raising, St. Catherine's High. -J. George Fay
- Fight song: "Black and White" Everybody up and cheer loud and long -For St. Catherine's High- -Send your voices up in joyous song- -Echoing to the sky! You Rah, Rah!- -What care we whom our rivals may be- -Now they strive and vie- -Black and White will fight, fight, fight, for St. Catherine's High. -J. George Fay
- Athletics: Yes
- Athletics conference: Metro Classic
- Mascot: Andy Angel
- Nickname: SCHS, St. Cat's
- Team name: Angels
- Accreditation: North Central Association of Colleges and Schools
- Newspaper: The Veritas, Angel Insider
- Yearbook: Lance
- Graduates: 100%
- Affiliation: Epsilon Program
- Athletic director: Dan Miller
- Website: www.saintcats.org

St. Catherine's High School is a private, Roman Catholic high school in Racine, Wisconsin. It is a member of Siena Catholic Schools of Racine and the Catholic Schools of the Roman Catholic Archdiocese of Milwaukee.

== History ==
St. Catherine's traces its origins to the fall of 1864 when the Racine Dominican Sisters established an all-girls' day and boarding academy. In the fall of 1864, the Racine Dominican Sisters opened a day and boarding school for girls on property they purchased at Twelfth Street and Park Avenue. The school was named St. Catherine's Academy. In 1874, the Academy was chartered by the State of Wisconsin, with the power to confer academic honors.

In 1907, the facilities of the Park Avenue building were no longer able to accommodate all the young ladies who made application for study there. Accordingly, the Sisters erected a boarding school, known as Holy Rosary Academy at Corliss, (Sturtevant), Wisconsin; day students continued to attend St. Catherine's Academy. Holy Rosary was closed in 1917. After the closure, Holy Rosary briefly served as St. Benedict the Moor's Boarding School for African Americans from 1920-1921.

In 1924 St. Catherine's (coed) High School opened and the all-girl academy was closed. A statue of St. Thomas Aquinas, the great Dominican saint and scholar, was enshrined in a niche above the main entrance, for the institution was originally to be named in his honor (to be known as St. Thomas High School.) The academy girls, however, convinced authorities to retain the name of St. Catherine's.

In the fall of 1945, in order to accommodate all the students seeking admission, St. Catherine's inaugurated a double-shift schedule. Excavation for a new wing was begun in March 1947, and Archbishop Kiley of Milwaukee dedicated the building extending 175 feet south on Park Avenue in August 1949.

The lot on the east side of Park Avenue is now used as an athletic field by the school. It was given to the school to use when the Dominican Sisters built their new motherhouse, Siena Center, and had the old convent building which stood on that property demolished. The North Central Association has accredited St. Catherine's High School since 1937.

On August 1, 2018, St. Catherine's became part of the newly-founded Siena Catholic Schools in Racine operated under the Archdiocese of Milwaukee, and is no longer a sponsored ministry of the Racine Dominicans. However, a member of the Racine Dominicans will sit on the board of trustees for the indefinite future.

== Basketball program ==
St. Catherine's is well known in the state for the success of the boys' basketball program. 3 of the team's coaches; Bob Letsch, John Mcguire, and Jim Kersten, have been inducted into the Wisconsin Basketball Coaches Association Hall of Fame (WBCA).

The Angels own a total of 16 state championships; 9 from the Wisconsin Independent Schools Athletic Association (WISAA) and its predecessor, the Wisconsin Catholic Interscholastic Athletic Association (WCIAA), and 7 since joining the Wisconsin Interscholastic Athletic Association (WIAA) in 2000 (2005, 2006, 2007, 2009, 2010, 2021 and 2026).

Coach John Mcguire, (1951-1962,1965-1979) finished his career with team with a record of 511–112, six WISAA state championships, five runner-up finishes and nine conference titles. His teams went undefeated in 1960, 1968, and 1970. He was inducted as a charter member into the Wisconsin Basketball Coaches Association's Hall of Fame in 1979 and into the Racine County Sports Hall of Fame in 2012.

Coach Robert "Bob" Letsch, (1979-2016) finished his career with a record 661–250, as the second-winningest high school basketball coach in Wisconsin's history. During his tenure, his teams compiled eight state championships in 1985, ’92, ’93, ’05, ’06, ’07, ’09 and ’10. He was inducted into the Wisconsin Basketball Coaches Association Hall of Fame in 2010 and the Racine County Sports Hall of Fame in 2013. His 2005-06 team went undefeated and holds the record for the largest victory margin in a state-title game, when the Angels pounded Westby 69–29 in the Division 3 championship game. Letsch was named Associated Press All- State Coach of the Year twice, in 1992 and 2007, and Racine All-County Coach of the Year 5 times: 1985, 1992, 2000, 2003 and 2005.

In 2016, the school named Coach Nick Bennett to replace Letsch after his retirement. He coached the team to its 6th state title in 2021, and was named Racine All-County, Associated Press All-State, and WBCA Coach of the Year. In July 2021, Bennett announced he was stepping down as coach of the Angels. He finished his career at St. Cat's with a record of 106-20.

On August 7, 2021 Coach Ryan Thompson was chosen to take over the basketball program as head coach. He led the team to its 7th WIAA title in 2026 and was named Racine All-County Coach of the Year.

== Athletics ==
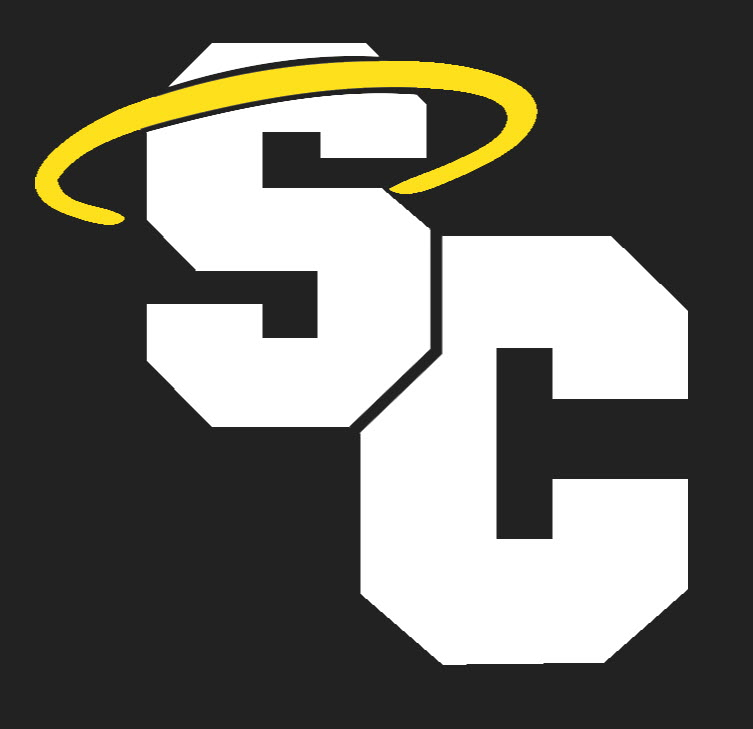
St. Cat's athletics' logo

St. Catherine's High School is a member of the Wisconsin Interscholastic Athletic Association(WIAA) and the Metro Classic Conference. The school offers the following sports:

Fall: football, boys' cross country, girls' cross country, boys' soccer, girls' volleyball, girls' swimming, girls' tennis, girls' golf, girls' pom pons

Winter: boys' basketball, girls' basketball, boys' bowling, girls' bowling, boys' swimming, girls' pom pons

Spring: baseball, boys' track & field, girls' track & field, boys' tennis, boys' golf, girls' soccer, girls' softball

=== Early history ===
St. Catherine's athletic program began in 1926 with the hiring of Coach and Athletic Director Fred "Bud" Beyer, a law student from Marquette University. The first sports introduced were basketball, football, and coed bowling. The first competitive game played was basketball, versus St. John's Cathedral of Milwaukee on Friday, January 8, 1926, in which St. Cat's lost 24 to 15. Beyer resigned in February 1927 and Eugene “Scrapiron” Young, a law student from the University of Notre Dame, was hired that March to fill the position. Baseball was introduced the same year with the hiring of Coach J. George Fay, a former Wausau Lumberjacks player from Milwaukee.

Originally nicknamed the "Saints," the school's team nickname was changed to the "Angels" beginning in the fall of 1940 in order to avoid confusion with other local high school teams with the same name.

Milwaukee Catholic Conference

In 1930, former Chicago Bear and Green Bay Packer, Thomas “Red” Hearden, took the reins of the athletic program. That same year St. Cat's joined the Catholic Conference; which originally consisted of Pio Nono, St. Bonaventure, Messmer, Cathedral, and Marquette High Schools. In 1938, Don Bosco was added to the conference, and in 1948, Pius XI and St. Benedict's joined; making a total of 8 teams.

WCIAA

In 1957, the school joined the newly formed Wisconsin Catholic Interscholastic Athletic Association (WCIAA). At that time, private schools were barred from the WIAA, so the WCIAA was formed to sanction tournaments to determine their own state champions.

WISAA

In 1968, St. Cat's joined the 58 member Wisconsin Independent Schools Athletic Association (WISAA) which combined all private schools. In 1972, the WISAA launched the girls' sports program, which officially sanctioned volleyball, basketball, tennis, and track state tournaments.

WIAA

In 1997, the WIAA members passed a vote which paved the way for St. Cat's (and all private schools in the state) to join the association in 2000.

=== WIAA State Championships (2000-present) ===
Sport	Years
Basketball-Boys	D2-2005, D3-2006, D3-2007, D3-2009, D3-2010, D3-2021, D3-2026
Cheerleading	2007-Stunt, 2018-Dance
Football	D4-2018, 2024
Soccer-Boys	D3-2009, D4-2016
Volleyball-Girls	D3-2010

=== WISAA State Championships (1968-1999) ===
Sport	Years
Baseball	1968, 1971, 1972, 1973, 1975, 1976, 1989
Basketball-Boys	1969, 1971, 1977, 1985, 1992, 1993
Basketball-Girls	1975, 1978
Cross Country-Boys	1968, 1969, 1970, 1971, 1975, 1985, 1996
Golf-Boys	1974
Softball	1977, 1993
Track-Boys	1985, 1995
Volleyball-Girls	1978
Wrestling	1970

=== WCIAA State Championships (1958-1967) ===
Sport	Years
Baseball	1964, 1965, 1966
Basketball-Boys	1958, 1959, 1961
Cross Country-Boys	1964
Golf-Boys	1959, 1960, 1961, 1964
Wrestling	1957

=== Milwaukee Archdiocesan High School Athletic "Catholic Conference" Titles (1931-1957) ===
Sport	Years
Basketball-Boys	1931, 1933, 1935, 1951
Football	1931, 1932, 1934, 1936, 1943, 1945, 1946, 1948, 1949, 1953, 1955, 1956, 1957
Golf-Boys	1952, 1954, 1956

== Notable alumni (year graduated) ==
- Dexter Baker (1967) - MiLB professional baseball player
- Christopher Barker (1978) - MiLB professional baseball player
- Paul Bebow (1954) - WFCA, Prairie du Chien High School Hall of Fame Coach
- Gene Beery (1955) - American painter and photographer
- James Caspers (1950) - 1959 World Archery Championships Gold medalist
- W. Richard Chiapete (1983) - Racine County district attorney (2012–2016)
- Jim Chones (1969) - NBA professional basketball player
- Jason Paul Collum (1991) - American film and television director, author
- Thomas P. Corbett (1933) - Wisconsin state legislator, Wisconsin circuit court judge (1969–1979), Racine County judge (1962–1969)
- Angelina Cruz (1997) - Wisconsin state legislator
- Howard DuRocher (1931) - Wisconsin circuit court judge (1956–1962), Racine County judge (1962–1978)
- Marcel Dandeneau (1950) - Wisconsin state legislator
- Margaret Danhauser (1939) - AAGPBL professional women's baseball player
- Victor DeLorenzo (1973) - drummer for the alternative rock band, the Violent Femmes
- Peter Deming (1976) - cinematographer
- John Dickert (1981) - 57th mayor of Racine (2009–2017)
- Margaret Farrow (1952) - first female lieutenant governor of Wisconsin
- Gregory A. Feest (1974) - Major General, U.S. Air Force (retired), former USAF Chief of Safety
- Paul Fervoy (1988) - CEO, Siftia
- Dennis J. Flynn (1960) - Wisconsin circuit court judge (1978–2002), Racine County judge (1976–1978)
- Gerald T. Flynn (1928) - U.S. representative (WI-01, 1959–1961)
- Eugene A. Gasiorkiewicz (1967) - Wisconsin circuit court judge (2010–present)
- George N. Gillett Jr. - American businessman
- Robert Goebel (1941) - Lieutenant Colonel, U.S. Air Force (retired), WWII Double Ace, author of MUSTANG ACE, Memoirs of a P-51 Fighter Pilot
- Marvin E. Grant (1935) - Lieutenant Colonel, U.S. Air Force (retired), First Ace from Racine, recipient of the Silver Star, Purple Heart, Distinguished Flying Cross
- Allen E. Gramza (1940) - U.S. administrative law judge (1970–1985)
- Jim Haluska (1950) - NFL professional football player, legendary coach
- James E. Held (1956) - Wisconsin state legislator
- Kevin Henkes (1979) - noted children's book author and illustrator
- James Herzog (1969) - MiLB professional baseball player
- Chad Harbach (1993) - author, The Art of Fielding
- Kenneth Huck (1954) - 52nd mayor of Racine (1969–1973)
- Donald G. Iselin (1940) - Rear Admiral, United States Navy (retired), former Commander of NAVFAC and Chief of the Civil Engineer Corps
- Richard A. "Rick" Jackson Jr. (1963) - MLB professional baseball player
- Thomas S. Johnson (1978) - Chairman and CEO of GreenPoint Financial Corp. and GreenPoint Bank
- Harvey Knuckles (1977) - Continental Basketball Association professional basketball player
- Richard J. Kreul (1955) - Wisconsin circuit court judge (1992–2012)
- William Letsch (1971) - MiLB professional baseball player
- Matt Lojeski (2003) - AEK B.C. professional basketball player
- Ralph Malicki (1982) - Racine County Executive (2025–present)
- Ben May (2000) - MLB umpire
- Jim McIlvaine (1990) - NBA professional basketball player and Marquette radio announcer
- Jerry Mertens (1954) - NFL professional football player
- Harry Mares (1958) - former mayor of White Bear Lake, Minnesota, Minnesota state legislator
- Tip McGuire (2005) - Wisconsin state legislator
- Bob Milkie (1957) - legendary Semi-Professional football coach, Racine Raiders HOF and Racine County Sports HOF inductee, 2 National Championships
- Andrew Elvis Miller (1985) - American actor, director, early member of Blue Man Group
- F. Don Miller (1938) - Colonel, U.S. Army (retired), Executive Director of the U.S. Olympic Committee (1973–1984), 1943 NCAA Boxing Championship welterweight champion, Purple Heart recipient
- Don Penza (1950) - former mayor of Wisconsin Rapids, Wisconsin, 1953 College Football All-America Team, legendary football coach
- Don Peterson (1946) - college football player
- Michael Petit (1969) - MiLB professional baseball player
- Michael R. Phegley (1980) - Village of Mount Pleasant municipal Judge (2010-)
- John "Jack" Rogan (1950) - founder of Rogan's Shoes
- James F. Rooney (1954) - Wisconsin state legislator, former chairman of the Wisconsin Waterways Commission
- Vinny Rottino (1998) - MLB professional baseball player
- Howie Ruetz (1947) - NFL professional football player
- Charles Rutkowski (1956) - NFL professional football player
- Kyle Schlachter (1999) - Mayor of Littleton, Colorado (2021–present)
- Stephen Simanek (1963) - Wisconsin circuit court judge (1980–2010), chief judge of the 2nd district (1990–1996)
- Richard J. Sklba (1952) - Catholic auxiliary bishop
- Don Smiley (1973) - President and Chief Executive Officer of Summerfest and former MLB executive
- Ralph Thomas (1948) - NFL professional football player, member of the 1951 San Francisco Dons football team
- Mary E. Triggiano (1981) - Wisconsin circuit court judge (2004–2023), chief judge of the 1st district (2020–2023)
- William Troy (1971) - Lieutenant General, U.S. Army (retired), former director of the U.S. Army Staff, Chief Executive Officer of American Society for Quality
- William "Bill" Weiss (1959) - Chief of police for Menasha, Wisconsin (1979–2002)
- Jim Welsh (1956) - NFL professional football player
- Paul Weyrich (1960) - American religious conservative political activist and commentator
- James Wilbershide (1936) - Wisconsin circuit court judge (1978–1989), Racine County judge (1971–1978)
- Leonard W. Ziolkowski (1963) - Racine County Executive (1982–1989), Racine's Harbor Park is named in his honor

== Notable faculty ==
- Bill Greiten - RCSHOF, WCCCA, WTFCA, Hall of Fame coach
- Tom Hearden - NFL professional football player, WFCA Hall of Fame coach
- Jim Kersten - WBCA Hall of Fame coach
- Bob Letsch - RCSHOF, WBCA Hall of Fame coach
- John McGuire - RCSHOF, WBCA Hall of Fame coach
- Dan Miller - WFCA Hall of Fame coach
- Eddie Race - WFCA Hall of Fame coach
- Tom Scheller - WCCCA Hall of Fame coach
- Eugene "Scrapiron" Young - author, professional trainer, coach and attorney
