= Rockbridge Baths, Virginia =

Rockbridge Baths
- Unincorporated community
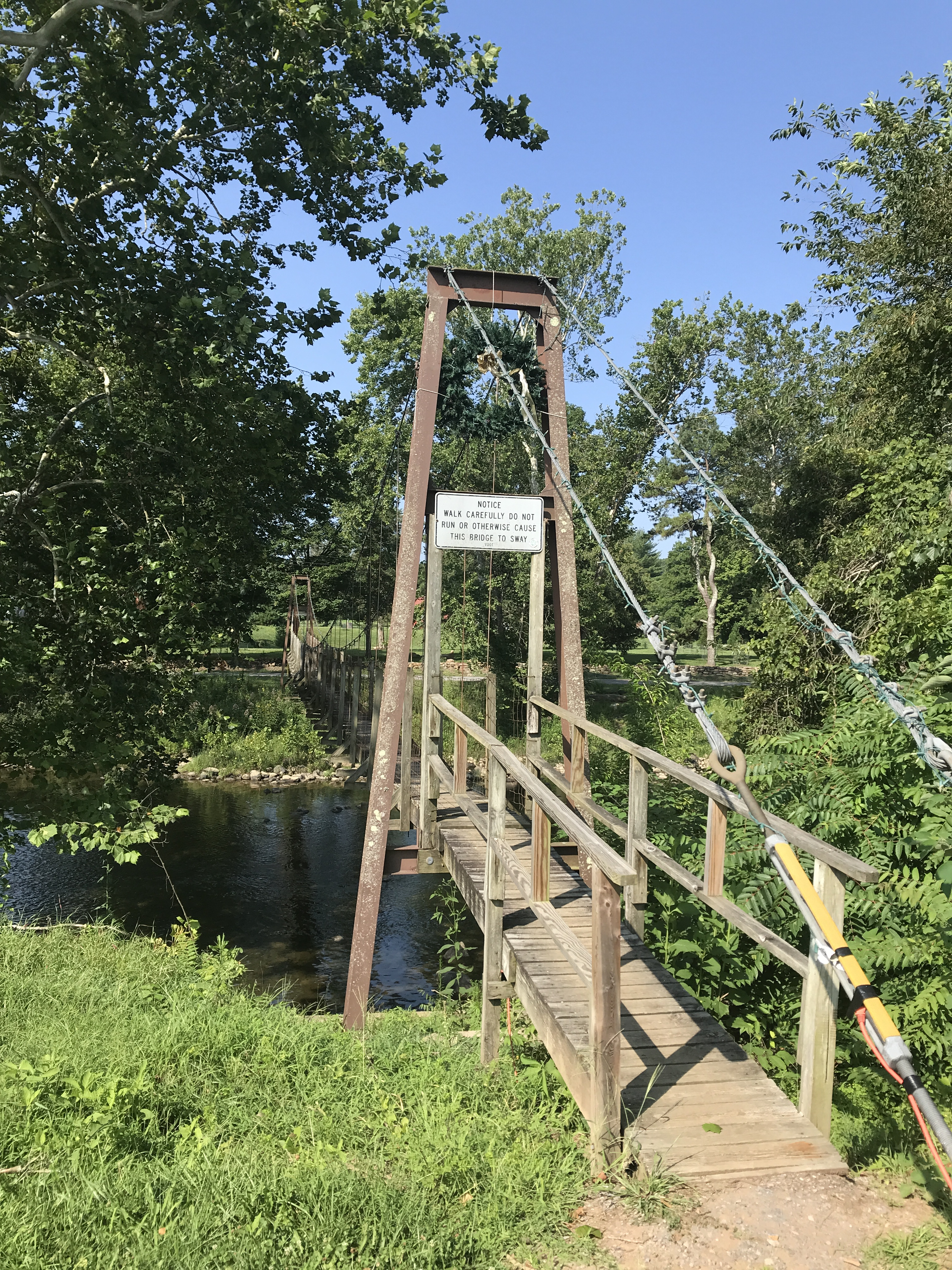
- Swinging Bridge over the Maury River in Rockbridge Baths, Virginia

- Location within the Commonwealth of Virginia Rockbridge Baths (the United States)
- Coordinates: 37°54′1″N 79°24′34″W
- Country: United States
- State: Virginia
- County: Rockbridge
- Time zone: UTC−5 (Eastern (EST))
  - Summer (DST): UTC−4 (EDT)
- ZIP codes: 24473
- Area code: 540

Rockbridge Baths is an unincorporated community in Rockbridge County, Virginia, United States.

Rockbridge Baths is located on state route 39, Maury River Road, midway between Lexington and Goshen. The waters contain iron and are rich in carbonic acid gas.(Moorman, J. J.: The Virginia Springs. J. B. Lippincott, New York, 1859, p. 289.)

A hotel accommodating 150 to 200 visitors was built there in 1857, and Robert E. Lee and his wife, Mary Custis Lee, frequented the resort. Its owner, Dr. Samuel Brown Morrison, had to give it up in 1900 because of illness, and when he left so did most of the patrons. A succession of owners followed, and in 1921 the Virginia Military Institute took over the property and established a summer school.

In 1926 the hotel burned to the ground and was not rebuilt. VMI then closed the summer school and sold the property, but the swimming pool, part of the dance hall, and some cottages can still be seen. (Cohen, Stan: Historic Springs of the Virginias. Pictorial Histories Publishing Co., Missoula, Montana, 1981, pp. 103, 121).

— From "Historic Spring Resorts and Their Lost Culture in Rockbridge County," By Erich Faber. Washington and Lee University Senior Thesis in Anthropology, 1988 (http://www.historicrockbridge.org/spreads/33_faber_springs.pdf)

== Notable people ==
- Jean Hélion, French painter
- Rick Mast, NASCAR driver
- Henry C. Schadeberg, politician
