= Lawrence H. Smith =

American politician (1892–1958)

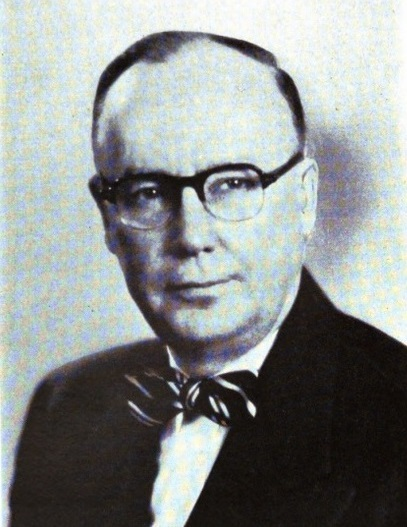

Member of the U.S. House of Representatives from Wisconsin's 1st district
- In office August 29, 1941 – January 22, 1958
- Preceded by: Stephen Bolles
- Succeeded by: Gerald T. Flynn

Personal details
- Born: September 15, 1892 Racine, Wisconsin, U.S.
- Died: January 22, 1958 (aged 65) United States Capitol, Washington, D.C., U.S.
- Cause of death: Heart attack
- Resting place: West Lawn Memorial Park, Mount Pleasant, Wisconsin
- Party: Republican
- Spouse: Eleanor J. Rowley (m. 1917–1958)
- Children: 3

Military service
- Allegiance: United States
- Branch/service: United States Army
- Years of service: 1917–1919
- Rank: 1st Lieutenant, USA
- Unit: 32nd Div. U.S. Infantry
- Battles/wars: World War I

Lawrence Henry Smith (September 15, 1892 – January 22, 1958) was an American lawyer and Republican politician from Racine, Wisconsin. He served 16 years in the U.S. House of Representatives, representing Wisconsin's 1st congressional district from 1941 until his death in 1958.

== Early life ==
Lawrence Smith was born in Racine, Wisconsin. He attended the Racine public schools and then attended Milwaukee State Teachers College. He took a break from his education during World War I and served as an officer in the 32nd U.S. Infantry Division from 1917 to 1919. After returning from the war, he attended Marquette University Law School, where he graduated in 1923. He was admitted to the bar the same year and commenced the practice of law in Racine, Wisconsin.

== Early political career ==
Smith quickly rose to prominence in the Racine legal community as a member of the law firm of then-district attorney Thorvald Beck. He made his first run for county office in 1924, when he ran as an independent Republican candidate for district attorney, but came in a distant third in the general election. Smith subsequently became a partner to Beck in a law firm known as Beck, Smith, & Heft.

Smith also became active in the American Legion and other local associations, and was chairman of the Racine chapter of the American Legion by 1926 and president of the county bar association. In 1937, he was elected commander of the Wisconsin department of the American Legion. Smith only served a year as commander, but remained active in the American Legion, and in 1939 he was advocating within the organization for an isolationist foreign policy in the face of another potential European war.

== In Congress ==
On July 8, 1941, Wisconsin congressman Stephen Bolles died in office, necessitating a special election to fill the rest of his term in the 77th United States Congress. Smith quickly entered the race for the Republican nomination. Foreign policy was the main issue in the election, as France had recently fallen to Germany and the United Kingdom was suffering under The Blitz. Smith continued to oppose the foreign policy of Franklin D. Roosevelt, but had switched to a more pragmatic position advocating the stockpiling of weaponry and war material in the United States, and endorsed the export of war material to the United Kingdom, though he still opposed any direct U.S. involvement in the war. Smith narrowly prevailed in a crowded Republican primary, receiving 28% of the vote against six opponents. He went on to face former congressman Thomas Ryum Amlie in the general election. Amlie, a former member of the Wisconsin Progressive Party, ran on strong support for Roosevelt's foreign policy. Smith won a resounding victory in the special election, receiving 63% of the vote.

Smith immediately abandoned any lingering isolationist positions as soon as word arrived of the Attack on Pearl Harbor, three months after Smith won his election. According to newspapers at the time, Smith's messages to his constituents in Wisconsin disavowing his previous position came almost immediately after the arrival of the news of the attack.

Smith went on to win re-election eight times, usually with landslide majorities. His closest election was in 1948, when he received just 52% of the vote against former state representative Jack Harvey.

Smith served for many years on the United States House Committee on Foreign Affairs and his public statements were largely focused on foreign policy. After World War II, his foreign policy position gradually moved back toward isolationism, first with skepticism toward the Marshall Plan and then stronger opposition to later foreign aid packages, notably opposing aide to Korea before the outbreak of the Korean War. Smith was also an early advocate for arms control treaties to prevent the proliferation of nuclear weapons, and despite his opposition to many foreign aid packages, he was a staunch anti-communist.

On domestic policy, Smith was opposed the growing power of the federal government and advocated for cutting federal spending. He also introduced an amendment to the United States Constitution to replace lifetime appointments for federal judges with ten year terms. Toward the end of his life he voted against the Civil Rights Act of 1957.

Smith died of a sudden heart attack on January 22, 1958, while walking into the House cafeteria in the United States Capitol. He was rushed to Walter Reed Army Medical Center, but was pronounced dead. His body was returned to Wisconsin and interred at West Lawn Memorial Park in Mount Pleasant, Wisconsin.

== Personal life and family ==
Lawrence Smith married Eleanor J. Rowley in 1917. They were married in Texas, where Smith was then going through induction into the Army for service in World War I. They had three children together. Eleanor was deeply involved in Lawrence's work for nearly his entire career, playing a leading role in the women's auxiliary in the American Legion, and then working as a staffer in his congressional office. After Lawrence Smith's sudden death, his wife stood for election to his seat in 1958, but she lost the general election to Democrat Gerald T. Flynn.

== Electoral history ==
=== Racine District Attorney (1924) ===
Racine County District Attorney Election, 1924
Party	Candidate	Votes	%	±%
General Election, November 4, 1924
Republican	Louis D. Potter	13,325	54.46%	
Independent Republican	George S. Lavin	5,901	24.12%	
Independent Republican	Lawrence H. Smith	3,618	14.79%	
Democratic	Theodore W. Waller	1,625	6.64%	
Plurality		7,424	30.34%	
Total votes		24,469	100.0%	
Republican hold				

=== U.S. House (1941–1956) ===
Year	Election	Date	Elected				Defeated				Total	Plurality
1941	Special; Primary	Aug. 8	Lawrence H. Smith	Republican	3,896	28.61%	George R. Cady	Rep.	2,867	21.05%	13,619	1,029
1941	Special; Primary	Aug. 8	Lawrence H. Smith	Republican	3,896	28.61%	Glenn W. Birkett	Rep.	2,495	18.32%	13,619	1,029
1941	Special; Primary	Aug. 8	Lawrence H. Smith	Republican	3,896	28.61%	Richard G. Harvey	Rep.	1,459	10.71%	13,619	1,029
1941	Special; Primary	Aug. 8	Lawrence H. Smith	Republican	3,896	28.61%	Burger M. Engebretson	Rep.	1,387	10.18%	13,619	1,029
1941	Special; Primary	Aug. 8	Lawrence H. Smith	Republican	3,896	28.61%	Harvey C. Hansen	Rep.	1,141	8.38%	13,619	1,029
1941	Special; Primary	Aug. 8	Lawrence H. Smith	Republican	3,896	28.61%	Gordon T. Whittet	Rep.	374	2.75%	13,619	1,029
1941	Special	Aug. 29	Lawrence H. Smith	Republican	29,638	63.62%	Thomas R. Amlie	Dem.	16,949	36.38%	46,587	12,689
1942	General	Nov. 3	Lawrence H. Smith (inc)	Republican	46,453	71.92%	Bernard F. Magruder	Dem.	16,848	26.08%	64,589	29,605
1942	General	Nov. 3	Lawrence H. Smith (inc)	Republican	46,453	71.92%	Walter G. Benson	Soc.	1,275	1.97%	64,589	29,605
1944	General	Nov. 7	Lawrence H. Smith (inc)	Republican	74,223	74.80%	John K. Kyle	Dem.	24,013	24.20%	99,230	50,210
1944	General	Nov. 7	Lawrence H. Smith (inc)	Republican	74,223	74.80%	Victor Cooks	Soc.	978	0.99%	99,230	50,210
1946	General	Nov. 5	Lawrence H. Smith (inc)	Republican	58,344	56.50%	John R. Redstrom	Dem.	44,188	42.79%	103,269	14,156
1946	General	Nov. 5	Lawrence H. Smith (inc)	Republican	58,344	56.50%	Lars P. Christensen	Soc.	734	0.71%	103,269	14,156
1948	Primary	Sep. 21	Lawrence H. Smith (inc)	Republican	28,749	69.58%	Ben Marvin	Rep.	8,440	20.43%	41,319	20,309
1948	Primary	Sep. 21	Lawrence H. Smith (inc)	Republican	28,749	69.58%	Edward J. Finan	Rep.	4,130	10.00%	41,319	20,309
1948	General	Nov. 2	Lawrence H. Smith (inc)	Republican	67,387	51.92%	Jack Harvey	Dem.	61,791	47.61%	129,783	5,596
1948	General	Nov. 2	Lawrence H. Smith (inc)	Republican	67,387	51.92%	John C. Spence	Soc.	604	0.47%	129,783	5,596
1950	General	Nov. 7	Lawrence H. Smith (inc)	Republican	70,883	57.18%	Jack Harvey	Dem.	53,071	42.81%	123,965	17,812
1952	General	Nov. 4	Lawrence H. Smith (inc)	Republican	99,742	59.37%	Arnie W. Agnew	Dem.	68,269	40.63%	168,013	31,473
1954	General	Nov. 4	Lawrence H. Smith (inc)	Republican	65,562	54.44%	Edward A. Krenzke	Dem.	54,864	45.56%	120,427	10,698
1956	General	Nov. 6	Lawrence H. Smith (inc)	Republican	94,882	57.06%	Gerald T. Flynn	Dem.	71,379	42.93%	166,277	23,503

== See also ==
- List of members of the United States Congress who died in office (1950–1999)

U.S. House of Representatives
Preceded by Stephen Bolles	Member of the U.S. House of Representatives from Wisconsin's 1st congressional district August 29, 1941 – January 22, 1958	Succeeded by Gerald T. Flynn
