= F. Don Miller =

American military officer and Olympic committee leader (1920–1996)

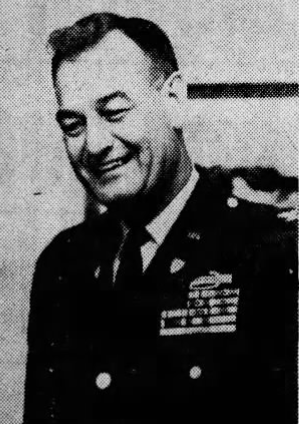
- Colonel F. Don Miller
- Born: April 9, 1920; Racine, Wisconsin
- Died: January 17, 1996 (aged 75); Colorado Springs, Colorado
- Burial place: Fort Sam Houston National Cemetery
- Military career
- Allegiance: United States
- Branch: United States Army
- Service years: 1943–1969
- Rank: Colonel
- Unit: Infantry Branch
- Commands: 79th Infantry Division (United States), 313th Infantry Regiment
- Conflicts: World War II, Korea, Vietnam
- Awards: Silver Star, 2 Bronze Stars, 2 Purple Hearts

Francis Donald Miller (April 9, 1920 – January 17, 1996) was a United States Army colonel, Executive Director of the USOC, President of the US Olympic & Paralympic Foundation, NCAA boxing champion, and a U.S. Olympic Boxing Team head coach.

== Early life and education ==
Col. F. Don Miller was born in Racine, Wisconsin on April 9, 1920. He was a graduate of St. Catherine's High School, class of 1939, and was a member of the boxing and football teams. He was the SE Wisconsin (novice-class) Golden Gloves welterweight champion in 1938 at 147 lbs. His senior year, he received the American Legion Medal, given to the best athlete of the class. He earned a physical education degree from the University of Wisconsin in 1943.

While at the University of Wisconsin, he was a member of the 1943 NCAA Boxing championships team and the individual champion at the 155 lbs.

== Military career ==
After earning the rank of second lieutenant in ROTC program at the University of Wisconsin, Miller entered active service at Fort Benning, Georgia, in April 1943. During combat in World War II, he served as a company commander for the 313th Infantry Regiment, 79th Division, in the European theater. On November 24, 1944, he was wounded by enemy fire while leading a 7th Army platoon into the city of Strasbourg, France.

In 1949, Miller was assigned to Fort Monmouth, New Jersey and oversaw boxing held at the U.S. Special Services School. While there he authored the first U.S. Army sports manual. During the 1950s, Miller worked for the Eighth United States Army as an assistant, and the Fourth United States Army, Fort Sam Houston as a special services officer. He coached the United States boxing teams in the 1951 Pan American Games and 1956 Olympic Games. In 1961, he was assigned to the Adjutant General's office at Fort Amador, Panama. In 1967, he was a representative of the U.S. delegation to the Pan-American games in Winnipeg and the 1968 Olympic Games in Mexico.

Colonel Miller retired from active service in 1969 as the director of Army Education and Morale Support Directorate, which made him the chief of all Army sports programs. He received multiple awards during his distinguished military career, including a Silver Star, 2 Bronze Stars, and 2 Purple Hearts.

== Olympics career ==
After retiring from the Army, Miller devoted the remainder of his life to the United States Olympic Committee (USOC) and America's athletes starting in 1969, when he was hired as an assistant executive director and led the fundraising department. In April 1971, he was appointed to USOC assistant executive director, and in 1973 he was named executive director, and remained at that position until 1985. During his tenure, Miller oversaw moving the USOC headquarters from New York to Colorado, initiated a sports medicine support program, and was a U.S. Olympic Festival planner. In 1985, he was named President of the U.S. Olympic Foundation and held that position until his passing in 1996.

Miller received the Olympic Order in 1984 and was inducted into the U.S. Olympic Hall of Fame in 1984. He also received the Centennial Trophy from the U.S. Olympic Committee in 1995.

== Personal life and death ==
Miller was married and had two 2 children. He died in Colorado Springs, Colorado in 1996 of cancer, and is buried at the Fort Sam Houston National Cemetery in San Antonio.

== Awards and recognition ==
- 1938 - awarded the American Legion Medal
- 1961 - received the United States Military Academy certificate of achievement
- 1965 - Knighted into the Order of Malta
- 1983 - presented the United States Sports Academy Distinguished Service Award
- 1984 - awarded the IOC Silver Olympic Order
- 1984 - inducted into the U.S. Olympic Hall of Fame
- 1984 - presented the Southland Olympia Award
- 1984 - presented the NASPE Hall of Fame Award
- 1985 - presented the DC Touchdown Club's Board of Governor's Award
- 1985 - awarded The Olympic & Paralympic Torch Award
- 1985 - the USOC creates the "F. Don Miller Award"
- 1995 - awarded the IOC Centennial Trophy
- 1996 - awarded the USOC Jack Kelly Fair Play Award
- 1996 - the Colorado Springs Sports Hall of Fame creates "Col. F. Don Miller Sports Service Award"
- 1997 - the "F. Don Miller Residence Hall" is dedicated at Olympic Training Center
- 2001 - inducted into the St. Catherine's H.S. Alumni Hall of Fame

=== United States Army Decorations ===
Combat Infantryman Badge
Army Distinguished Service Medal
Silver Star
Bronze Star with oak leaf cluster
Purple Heart with oak leaf cluster
Army Presidential Unit Citation
World War I Victory Medal
American Defense Service Medal with one bronze service star
American Campaign Medal
European-African-Middle Eastern Campaign Medal
Asiatic-Pacific Campaign Medal
World War II Victory Medal
Army of Occupation Medal
National Defense Service Medal
United Nations Korea Medal
