= Jack Harvey (politician) =

American politician (1907–1986)

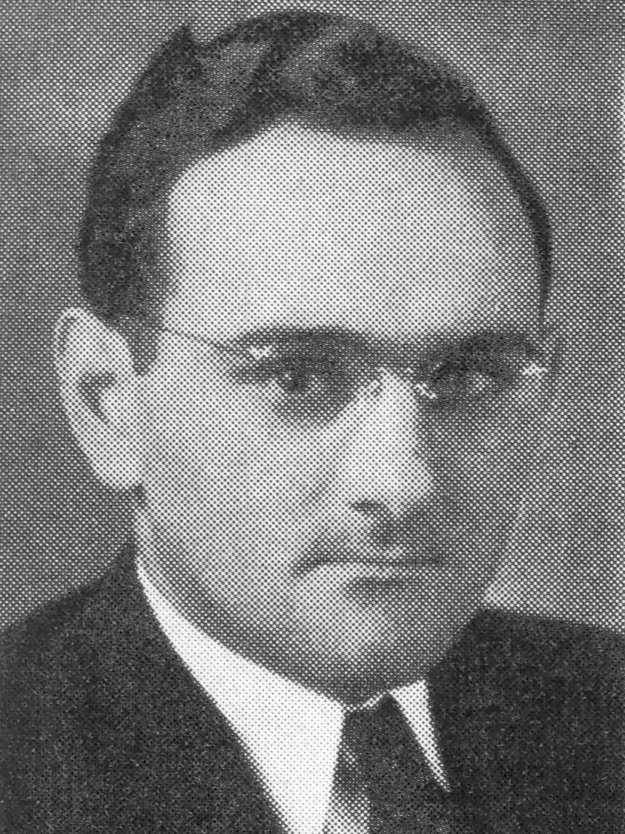
Harvey circa 1940

Jack Harvey (September 9, 1907 – March 13, 1986) was a politician in Wisconsin.

== Biography ==
Harvey was born in Chelsea, Massachusetts. Later, he moved to Racine, Wisconsin.

== Career ==
Harvey went to the University of Wisconsin–Madison and worked in factories and restaurants. He served on the Racine Common Council. Harvey was a member of the Wisconsin State Assembly from 1937 to 1940 on the Wisconsin Progressive Party ticket. In 1948 and 1950, he was candidate for the United States House of Representatives from Wisconsin's 1st congressional district, losing to incumbent Lawrence H. Smith both times. Harvey was a Democrat. He served in the United States Army during World War II. He died in 1986.
