= Dennis J. Flynn =

20th century America judge

Wisconsin Circuit Judge for the Racine Circuit, Branch 8
- In office August 1, 1978 – January 1, 2002
- Preceded by: Position established
- Succeeded by: Faye M. Flancher

Judge of Racine County, Branch 6
- In office August 1, 1976 – July 31, 1978
- Preceded by: Position established
- Succeeded by: Position abolished

Personal details
- Born: January 14, 1942 (age 84) Racine, Wisconsin, U.S.
- Party: Democratic
- Spouses: Nancy Gaetano (m. 1966, divorced); Patricia Bressers (m. 2001)
- Children: 6 (with Nancy Gaetano)
- Parent: Gerald T. Flynn (father)
- Education: Georgetown University; Marquette University Law School
- Profession: Lawyer, judge

Military service
- Allegiance: United States
- Branch/service: United States Army; United States Army Reserve
- Years of service: 1967–1969
- Rank: Captain, USA
- Unit: 1st Div. U.S. Infantry
- Battles/wars: Vietnam War
- Awards: Bronze Star Medal; Air Medal; Commendation Medal; Civil Actions Medal

Dennis John Flynn (born January 14, 1942) is a retired American lawyer and judge. He served 24 years as a Wisconsin circuit court judge in Racine County. He is still active as a reserve judge. His father was U.S. congressman Gerald T. Flynn.

== Biography ==
Dennis J. Flynn was born in January 1942, in Racine, Wisconsin. He graduated from Racine's St. Catherine's High School and went on to Georgetown University. He graduated from the Walsh School of Foreign Service in 1964 and then Marquette University Law School in 1967. While in school he was enrolled in the Reserve Officers' Training Corps. After graduating from law school, he entered active duty for two years in the United States Army. He spent a year in Vietnam, from Summer 1968 to Summer 1969, as captain of an ambulance company in the 1st Infantry Division, and later as adjutant of his battalion in that same division.

Flynn returned to Racine after completing his service in the Vietnam War and briefly partnered with his father in a law practice. In 1970, he left private practice when he was hired as an assistant district attorney. Flynn then spent the rest of his career in public service, being selected as corporation counsel to Racine County in 1971, then elected county judge in 1976. Following the constitutional amendments reorganizing Wisconsin's court system in 1977, Flynn transitioned to a Wisconsin circuit court judgeship in 1978. He was subsequently re-elected four times. For most of his judicial career, he was assigned to juvenile and family court cases. He retired at the end of 2001, but as of 2023 is still available as a reserve judge. After leaving active judicial service, Flynn was employed as of counsel in the firm Schoone, Lueck, Kelley, Pitts & Knurr.

In 2017, Flynn signed onto a letter along with 53 other retired Wisconsin judges petitioning the Wisconsin Supreme Court to adopt stricter recusal rules for themselves and all other state judges. Specifically, they sought guidelines advising judges not to handle cases where one of the litigants or attorneys had made substantial donations to the judge's election campaign. The Wisconsin Supreme Court declined to take any action.

That same year, Flynn was called on to serve as a referee in handling allegations of misconduct by Kenosha County district attorney Robert Zapf. Flynn's ultimate recommendation to the Wisconsin Supreme Court was that Zapf should have his law license suspended and should be prohibited from serving as a prosecutor again.

== Personal life and family ==
Dennis Flynn was one of four children born to Gerald T. Flynn and his wife Mary (née McAvoy). Gerald Flynn was a lawyer and Democratic politician in Racine who served one term in the United States House of Representatives.

Dennis Flynn married Nancy Tomasina Gaetano, of Silver Spring, Maryland, on August 6, 1966. They met in Washington, D.C., while Flynn was studying at Georgetown and Gaetano at Catholic University. They had six children together before divorcing. Flynn married his second wife, Patricia "Patti" Bressers, in 2001. Flynn now splits his time between homes in Racine and Scottsdale, Arizona.

Legal offices
New branch	Judge of Racine County, Branch 6 August 1, 1976 – July 31, 1978	Office abolished
New circuit	Wisconsin Circuit Judge for the Racine Circuit, Branch 8 August 1, 1978 – January 1, 2002	Succeeded by Faye M. Flancher
