= Henry C. Schadeberg =

American politician (1913–1985)

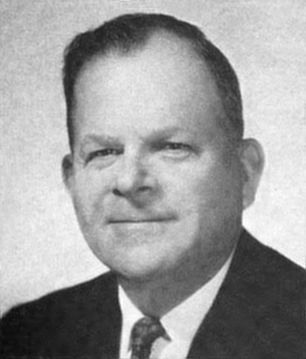

Member of the U.S. House of Representatives from Wisconsin's 1st district
- In office January 3, 1967 – January 3, 1971
- Preceded by: Lynn E. Stalbaum
- Succeeded by: Les Aspin
- In office January 3, 1961 – January 3, 1965
- Preceded by: Gerald T. Flynn
- Succeeded by: Lynn E. Stalbaum

Personal details
- Born: Henry Carl Schadeberg; October 12, 1913 Manitowoc, Wisconsin, U.S.
- Died: December 11, 1985 (aged 72) Rockbridge Baths, Virginia, U.S.
- Resting place: cremated
- Party: Republican
- Spouse: Ruth Eleanor Hamilton (m. 1938–1985)
- Education: Carroll College (B.A.); Garrett Biblical Institute (B.D.)
- Profession: Pastor

Military service
- Allegiance: United States
- Branch/service: United States Navy Reserve
- Years of service: 1943–1945; 1951–1966
- Rank: Captain, USNR
- Unit: USS Louisville (CA-28)
- Battles/wars: World War II; Pacific War; Philippines campaign; Volcano and Ryukyu Islands campaign; Korean War

Henry Carl Schadeberg (October 12, 1913 – December 11, 1985) was an American protestant minister and Republican politician from southeast Wisconsin. He was a member of the U.S. House of Representatives for four terms, representing Wisconsin's 1st congressional district from 1961 to 1965, and from 1967 to 1971. Schadeberg was known as an unabashed conservative and a strident anti-communist.

== Early life and education ==
Henry Schadeberg was born and raised in Manitowoc, Wisconsin. He graduated from Manitowoc's Lincoln High School in 1931. Schadeberg was active in his church and church community from an early age. He went to Carroll College in 1934. While in college, he began preaching at a Congregational church in East Troy, Wisconsin. After completing his bachelor's degree in 1938, he became pastor serving three Methodist churches in eastern Walworth County, Wisconsin. He went on to attend Garrett Biblical Institute in Evanston, Illinois, where he earned his Bachelor of Divinity degree in 1941.

== Pastoral career and military service ==
After completing his second degree, he moved to northern Wisconsin, where he was pastor of the Methodist church in Oconto. After a year, he returned to southern Wisconsin, preaching in central Rock County. In 1943, he was elected the first president of the Evansville Ministerial Association.

In the fall of 1943, he enlisted in the United States Navy to serve as a chaplain in World War II, and was commissioned as a lieutenant junior grade. He was initially assigned to chaplain to a group of African American sailors managing a naval ammunition depot in Virginia. He was deployed in the Summer of 1944 to the Pacific War with the cruiser USS Louisville (CA-28), and served with the first phase of the Philippines campaign. He returned to Wisconsin on shore leave in the Spring of 1945, but returned to the Louisville during the Volcano and Ryukyu Islands campaign. After V.J. Day, Schadeberg was appointed chaplain to Admiral George D. Murray in the Mariana Islands group. He was awarded a commendation in the Fall of 1945 and returned to the United States in December.

After the war, he began preaching at historic Plymouth Congregational Church in Burlington, Wisconsin, and became chaplain of the local American Legion post. He was formally installed as pastor of Plymouth Church in the Fall of 1946 and also continued reserve duties as chaplain for the Burlington Civil Air Patrol. In addition to his normal pastoral duties, he was outspoken about political issues of the day. He spoke against racial prejudice that he had encountered through his service in Virginia, and framed the Cold War competition as a moral crusade. He frequently gave speeches about "Americanism" and other patriotic ideas which later framed his political philosophy.

In 1952, he was formally recalled to active duty in the Navy due to the Korean War. After re-training, he was assigned as senior chaplain at United States Naval Training Center Bainbridge, in Maryland, where he was promoted to lieutenant commander. His family joined him there shortly after his arrival. He remained in Maryland until the conclusion of his active duty service in September 1953. He remained in the Navy Reserve until 1966, rising to the rank of captain.

In 1957, he was appointed chairman of the local committee to direct community efforts to integrate the staff and personnel of the planned R.I. Bong Air Force Base into Burlington society. The base, however, was never completed. Schadeberg remained active in the American Legion and continued blending patriotic messages with his pastoral duties. Later in 1957, he was elected moderator of the Milwaukee Association of Congregational Ministers, and the next year became president of the Burlington chapter of Rotary International.

== Political career ==
Wisconsin's 1st congressional district (1932–1963)

In the Fall of 1959, Schadeberg announced he would run for Congress, seeking the Republican Party nomination to challenge incumbent Democrat Gerald T. Flynn in Wisconsin's 1st congressional district. Republicans were widely expected to win the seat; Flynn was in his first term and had won a very narrow victory in the 1958 Democratic wave election after Republicans had held the 1st congressional district almost continuously since the founding of the party.

=== Congress ===
Schadeberg first faced a contested Republican primary against attorneys Richard Harvey Jr. and Edward Zahn Jr. Zahn was also a former assistant to then-Labor Secretary James P. Mitchell in the Eisenhower administration. Zahn and Harvey both criticized Schadeberg for lacking understanding of law and congressional process, but Schadeberg described that as an asset and suggested government didn't need more professional politicians. Schadeberg prevailed with 47% of the vote, assisted by a large volunteer campaign organization. In the general election, Schadeberg asserted his belief in small government and attacked the welfare state as "creeping socialism". Schadeberg won the election with 53% of the vote, unseating Flynn.

In the 87th Congress, Schadeberg quickly aligned himself with the conservative faction of Republicans and Dixiecrats. Throughout the term he frequently wrote or spoke in Wisconsin with fiery attacks on socialism, encouraging voters to elect more conservatives. He was assigned to the House Un-American Activities Committee and the House Veterans' Affairs Committee. By 1961, the House Un-American Activities Committee had become a political lightning rod due after the Hollywood blacklist, the downfall of Joe McCarthy, and a recent police riot at a committee hearing held at San Francisco City Hall. There were calls to abolish the committee in 1961, which Schadeberg rejected, impugning the patriotism of those who would call for the committee's discontinuation. In the 1962 election, Schadeberg faced a rematch with Gerald Flynn, who accused Schadeberg of blocking civil rights legislation with his conservative allies. Schadeberg prevailed again by a similar margin.

During the 88th Congress, Schadeberg voted against the Clean Air Act. And, although he publicly expressed disagreements with parts of the Civil Rights Act of 1964, he ultimately voted in favor.

Wisconsin's 1st congressional district 1964–1971

In 1963, the 76th Wisconsin Legislature passed a congressional redistricting act. The new map made only one change to Schadeberg's congressional district, but it was significant for his election chances—Green County was entirely removed from the district. At the time, Green County was described as a bank of reliable Republican votes. Later that year, Schadeberg was urged by the Wisconsin Young Republicans to run for United States Senate in 1964 against incumbent Democrat William Proxmire, but he ultimately chose to run for re-election instead. In the 1964 general election, he faced Racine state senator Lynn E. Stalbaum. Stalbaum, running as a moderate Democrat, attacked Schadeberg for blanket opposition to most of the agenda of presidents Kennedy and Johnson, and often attempted to link him to the Republican presidential nominee that year, Arizona U.S. senator Barry Goldwater. The 1964 election, another Democratic wave year, resulted in a landslide against Goldwater and Republican incumbents; Stalbaum defeated Schadeberg with 51.5% of the vote, roughly 5,500 votes ahead of Schadeberg.

=== Time between terms ===
After leaving office, Schadeberg immediately organized a lobbying and congressional affairs office, called Research and Public Affairs Services, Inc. He continued to make strident anti-communist speeches in the district, but attempted to moderate his public image. He did not initially commit to running again, but actively warned other Republicans away from entering the primary. Schadeberg officially entered the race in March 1966, and faced no opposition in the primary. Schadeberg received early support from Republican House minority leader Gerald Ford, and began attacking congressional Democrats for increased spending, "rubber stamping" Johnson's agenda, and mishandling of the Vietnam War. White backlash against the Voting Rights Act of 1965, which Stalbaum voted for, was also a significant motivating issue in the campaign, despite the fact that Schadeberg also indicated he would have voted for the law. The 1966 rematch was another very close election, with Schadeberg prevailing with 51% of the vote.

=== Return to Congress ===
Stalbaum returned for another rematch in 1968 resulting in a similarly close election; Schadeberg won his fourth term. Following the death of Martin Luther King Jr., Schadeberg infamously blamed urban rioting on foreign communist infiltration.

In 1970, however, Republicans early identified Schadeberg as facing a difficult re-election. Yale-educated economics professor Les Aspin emerged as his general election opponent, after narrowly defeating environmentalist Doug La Follette and former congressman Gerald Flynn in the Democratic primary. This was Aspin's second run for elected office after serving as a campaign manager and legislative staffer to U.S. Senator William Proxmire, as an aide to the Council of Economic Advisers under Kennedy, and as an appointee in the Department of Defense under Johnson. Aspin was a vigorous campaigner and a fiscal conservative, and demonstrated a mastery of foreign policy and military issues. But Aspin focused his message on the economy and inflation challenges, attacking the Nixon administration for mismanaging the economy. Aspin, who was 25 years younger than Schadeberg, also emphasized a message of new leadership and new ideas. Schadeberg doubled down on law and order rhetoric and traditional values, but avoided engaging on other issues. Aspin won the election with nearly 61% of the vote—a lopsided victory in the normally competitive district.

== Retirement and death ==
After leaving Congress, Schadeberg worked as a pastor for five years in Greenville, Michigan, before retiring to a farm in Rockbridge Baths, Virginia. He died of natural causes at his home, there, on December 11, 1985.

== Personal life and family ==
Henry Schadeberg was the youngest of nine children born to George Schadeberg and his wife Rosa Clara (née Brockhoff). George Schadeberg was a masonry contractor and served seven years on the Manitowoc school board and 17 years on the county board of supervisors. He also served on the county board of appeals and served as an undersheriff and justice of the peace. All four of Henry's grandparents were German American immigrants.

Henry Schadeberg married Ruth Eleanor Hamilton, of Waukesha, on June 18, 1938. Ruth was also a Carroll College graduate and, during college, was president of the national society of phrateres. She subsequently worked as a teacher and was active in the American Association of University Women. They had four children and were married for 47 years before Henry's death in 1985.

== Electoral history ==
=== U.S. House (1960–1970) ===
Year	Election	Date	Elected				Defeated				Total	Plurality
1960	Primary	Sep. 13	Henry C. Schadeberg	Republican	17,218	47.05%	Edward J. Zahn Jr.	Rep.	12,046	32.91%	36,598	5,172
1960	Primary	Sep. 13	Henry C. Schadeberg	Republican	17,218	47.05%	Richard G. Harvey Jr.	Rep.	7,334	20.04%	36,598	5,172
1960	General	Nov. 8	Henry C. Schadeberg	Republican	97,662	52.70%	Gerald T. Flynn (inc)	Dem.	87,646	47.30%	185,312	10,016
1962	General	Nov. 6	Henry C. Schadeberg (inc)	Republican	71,657	53.29%	Gerald T. Flynn	Dem.	62,800	46.71%	134,460	8,857
1964	General	Nov. 3	Lynn E. Stalbaum	Democratic	90,450	51.52%	Henry C. Schadeberg (inc)	Rep.	85,117	48.48%	175,567	5,333
1966	General	Nov. 8	Henry C. Schadeberg	Republican	65,041	51.04%	Lynn E. Stalbaum (inc)	Dem.	62,398	48.96%	127,439	2,643
1968	General	Nov. 5	Henry C. Schadeberg (inc)	Republican	89,200	50.89%	Lynn E. Stalbaum	Dem.	86,067	49.11%	175,267	3,133
1970	Primary	Sep. 8	Henry C. Schadeberg (inc)	Republican	16,615	86.28%	Emil F. Hess Jr.	Rep.	2,641	13.72%	19,256	13,974
1970	General	Nov. 3	Les Aspin	Democratic	87,428	60.93%	Henry C. Schadeberg (inc)	Rep.	56,067	39.07%	143,495	31,361

== See also ==
- List of members of the House Un-American Activities Committee

U.S. House of Representatives
Preceded by Gerald T. Flynn	Member of the U.S. House of Representatives from Wisconsin's 1st congressional district January 3, 1961 – January 3, 1965	Succeeded by Lynn E. Stalbaum
Preceded by Lynn Stalbaum	Member of the U.S. House of Representatives from Wisconsin's 1st congressional district January 3, 1967 – January 3, 1971	Succeeded by Les Aspin
