= Les Aspin =

American politician (1938–1995)

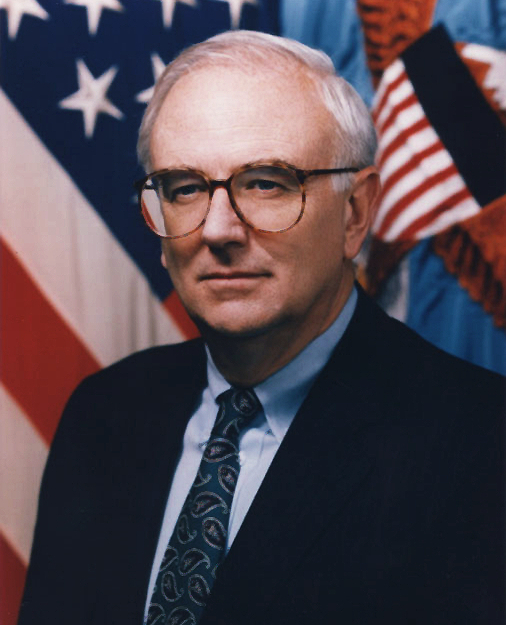
- Official portrait, c. 1993–1994

Chair of the President's Intelligence Advisory Board
- In office May 26, 1994 – May 21, 1995
- President: Bill Clinton
- Preceded by: William Crowe
- Succeeded by: Warren Rudman (acting)

18th United States Secretary of Defense
- In office January 21, 1993 – February 3, 1994
- President: Bill Clinton
- Deputy: William Perry
- Preceded by: Dick Cheney
- Succeeded by: William Perry

Chair of the House Armed Services Committee
- In office January 3, 1985 – January 20, 1993
- Preceded by: Melvin Price
- Succeeded by: Ron Dellums

Member of the U.S. House of Representatives from Wisconsin's 1st district
- In office January 3, 1971 – January 20, 1993
- Preceded by: Henry Schadeberg
- Succeeded by: Peter Barca

Personal details
- Born: Leslie Aspin Jr. July 21, 1938 Milwaukee, Wisconsin, U.S.
- Died: May 21, 1995 (aged 56) Washington, D.C., U.S.
- Party: Democratic
- Spouse: Maureen Shea (m. 1969; div. 1979)
- Education: Yale University (BA); University of Oxford (MPhil); Massachusetts Institute of Technology (PhD)

Military service
- Allegiance: United States
- Branch/service: United States Army
- Years of service: 1966–1968
- Rank: Captain
- Les Aspin's voice Aspin, as chair of the House Armed Services Committee, speaks on the use of force against Iraq; Recorded January 12, 1991

Leslie Aspin Jr. (July 21, 1938 – May 21, 1995) was an American Democratic Party politician and economist who served as the U.S. representative for Wisconsin's 1st congressional district from 1971 to 1993 and as the 18th United States Secretary of Defense under President Bill Clinton from 1993 to 1994.

In Congress, Aspin had a reputation as an intellectual who took a middle-of-the-road position on controversial issues. He supported the Reagan administration regarding the MX missile and aid to the Nicaraguan Contras, but he opposed the B-2 bomber and the Strategic Defense Initiative. He played a major role in convincing the House to support the January 1991 resolution supporting the use of force by President George H. W. Bush against Iraq, after it invaded Kuwait.

As Secretary of Defense, Aspin faced complex social issues, such as the roles of homosexuals in uniform, and of women in combat, as well as major decisions regarding the use of military force in Somalia, Bosnia, and Haiti. He proposed budget cuts and restructuring of forces as part of the downsizing of the military after the end of the Cold War. The deaths of U.S. soldiers in Somalia attributed to inadequate military support led to his resignation.

== Early life and education ==
Aspin was born in Milwaukee, Wisconsin. He graduated from Shorewood High School. He attended Yale University, where he was admitted to the Zeta Psi fraternity, and graduated summa cum laude in 1960 with a Bachelor of Arts in history. Aspin then attended the University of Oxford, where he received his Master of Philosophy in economics in 1962. He later received a Doctor of Philosophy in economics from the Massachusetts Institute of Technology in 1966.

Aspin met his wife, Maureen Shea, in Saigon during the Vietnam War. Shea, a graduate of Hollins College, was working for a research firm interviewing Vietcong defectors when the two were introduced by a mutual acquaintance. After the project was completed she moved to Wisconsin to work on Aspin's unsuccessful bid for Wisconsin State Treasurer in 1968. The couple became engaged in October 1968 and married in January 1969 in Shea's hometown of Hillsdale, New York. The couple divorced in 1979 and had no children.

Aspin served a brief tenure as a congressional staff member for United States Senator William Proxmire. As an officer in the U.S. Army from 1966 to 1968, he served as a systems analyst in the Pentagon under Secretary of Defense Robert S. McNamara, serving in the Office of Systems Analysis. Before his election as a Democrat to Congress in 1970, Aspin had been active in Wisconsin politics and had taught economics at Marquette University.

== U.S. Congress ==
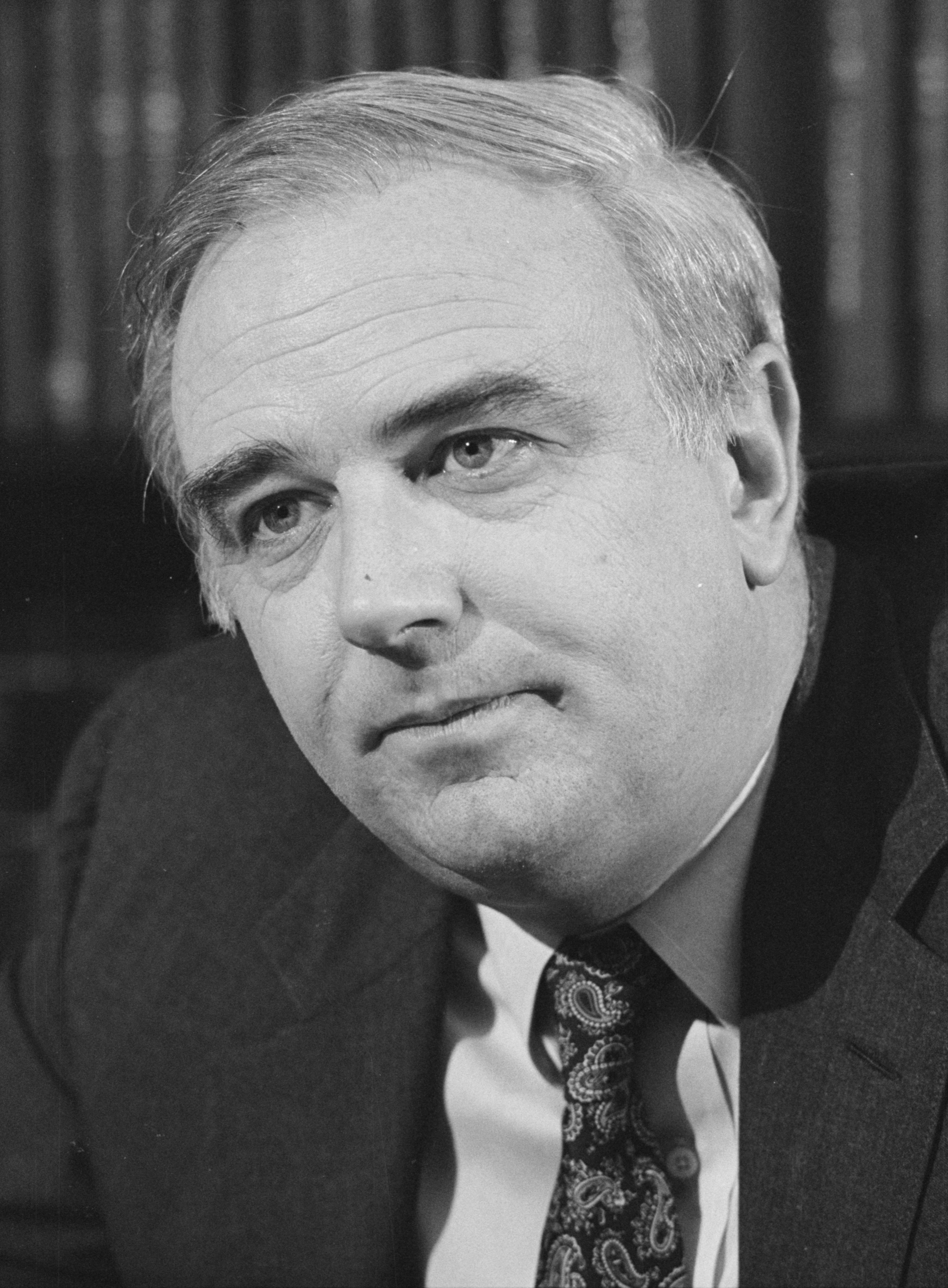
Les Aspin in 1981

Aspin ran as a peace candidate in 1970, opposing the Vietnam War. In the Democratic primary he was opposed by Doug La Follette, who was endorsed by the party. Aspin lost the initial count by a few dozen votes, and initially refused to pay for a recount out of his own pocket. It was only after his Kenosha County campaign director, Edwin M. Andersen, was able to garner financial support from numerous supporters, however, that the legendarily thrifty Aspin then demanded a recount and won the primary, by a few dozen votes. In the general election he defeated the incumbent, Henry Schadeberg.

Aspin was elected as a Democrat to the 92nd and to the 11 succeeding Congresses and served from January 3, 1971, until his resignation January 20, 1993. Aspin began his career in the United States House of Representatives as an outsider but honed his particular interest and expertise in defense matters. Before and during his tenure in the House, he had opposed the U.S. involvement in the Vietnam War. In April 1972, he sued Department of Defense in District Court for the U.S. Army to release the Peers Commission investigation of the My Lai massacre.

In his early years in Congress, he often issued press releases critical of shortcomings he detected in the armed forces. In 1973, he criticized the Air Force for devising a plan to purchase 200 beagle puppies, tie the dogs' vocal cords, and conduct tests of poisonous gases. After Aspin began a publicity campaign against the Air Force's plan, an outraged public sent a record number of letters to the Defense Department, surpassing the amount ever sent about any other subject. In March 1974, Aspin told an audience at Brown University, including future 4-star General Wesley Clark and four West Point cadets: "You, the young officer and cadets sitting there - never in your lifetimes will you see us intervene abroad. We've learned that lesson."

By 1985, when Aspin became chairman of the Armed Services Committee, he was recognized as a leading defense authority. His chairmanship caused controversy among some House Democrats, particularly because he supported the Reagan administration's policies on the MX missile and aid to the Nicaraguan Contras. Although temporarily removed from his committee chair by his Democratic colleagues in January 1987, Aspin weathered the crisis and regained the chairmanship three weeks later. He again broke with many Democrats in January 1991 when he issued a paper supporting the Bush administration's intention to use military force to drive the Iraqis from Kuwait. The accuracy of his prediction that the United States could win a quick military victory with light casualties added to his reputation as a military expert.

== Secretary of Defense ==
=== Nomination and confirmation ===
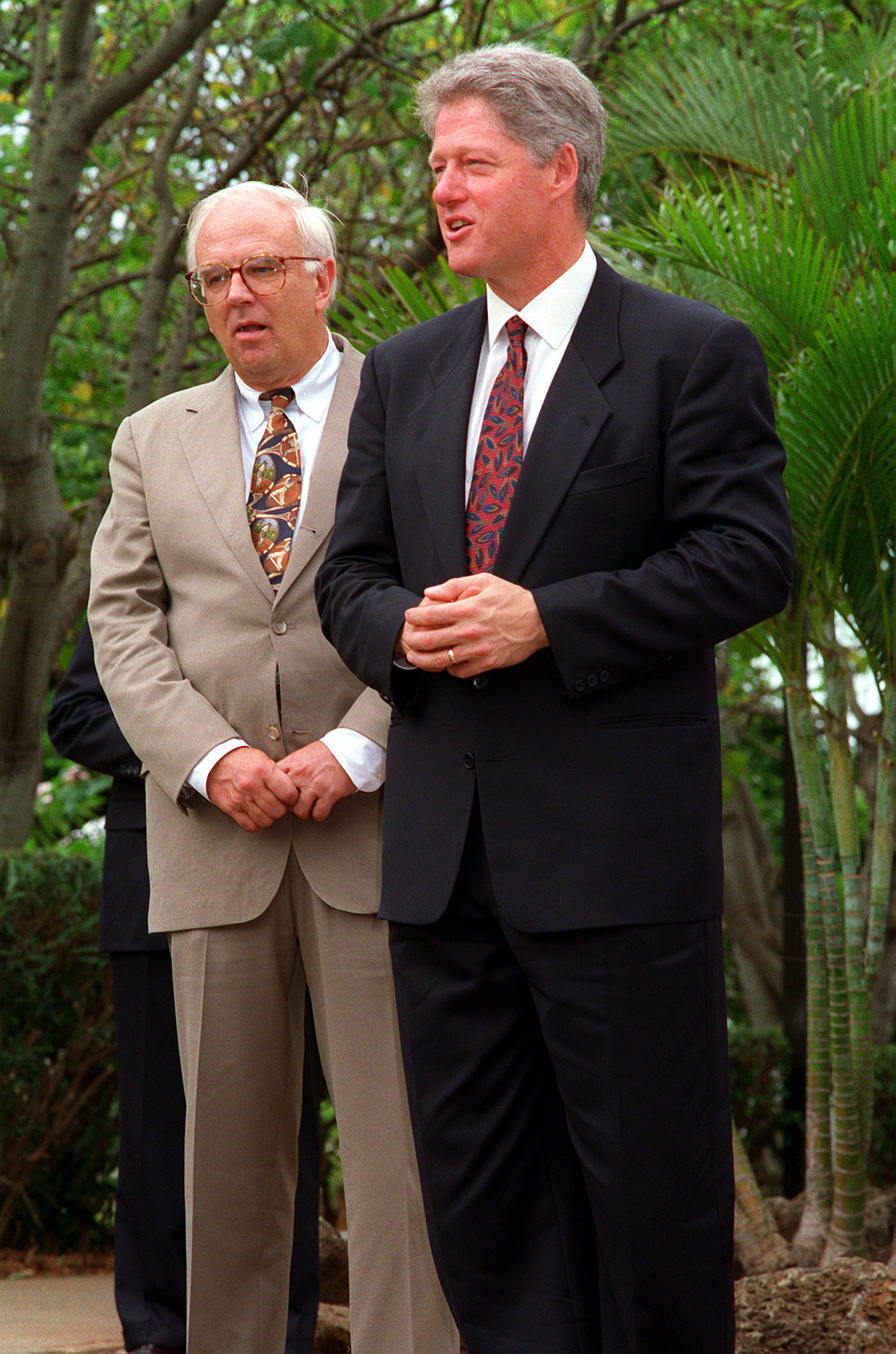
Les Aspin and President Clinton in at Admiral's Landing as they prepare to visit the USS Arizona Memorial (July 1993)

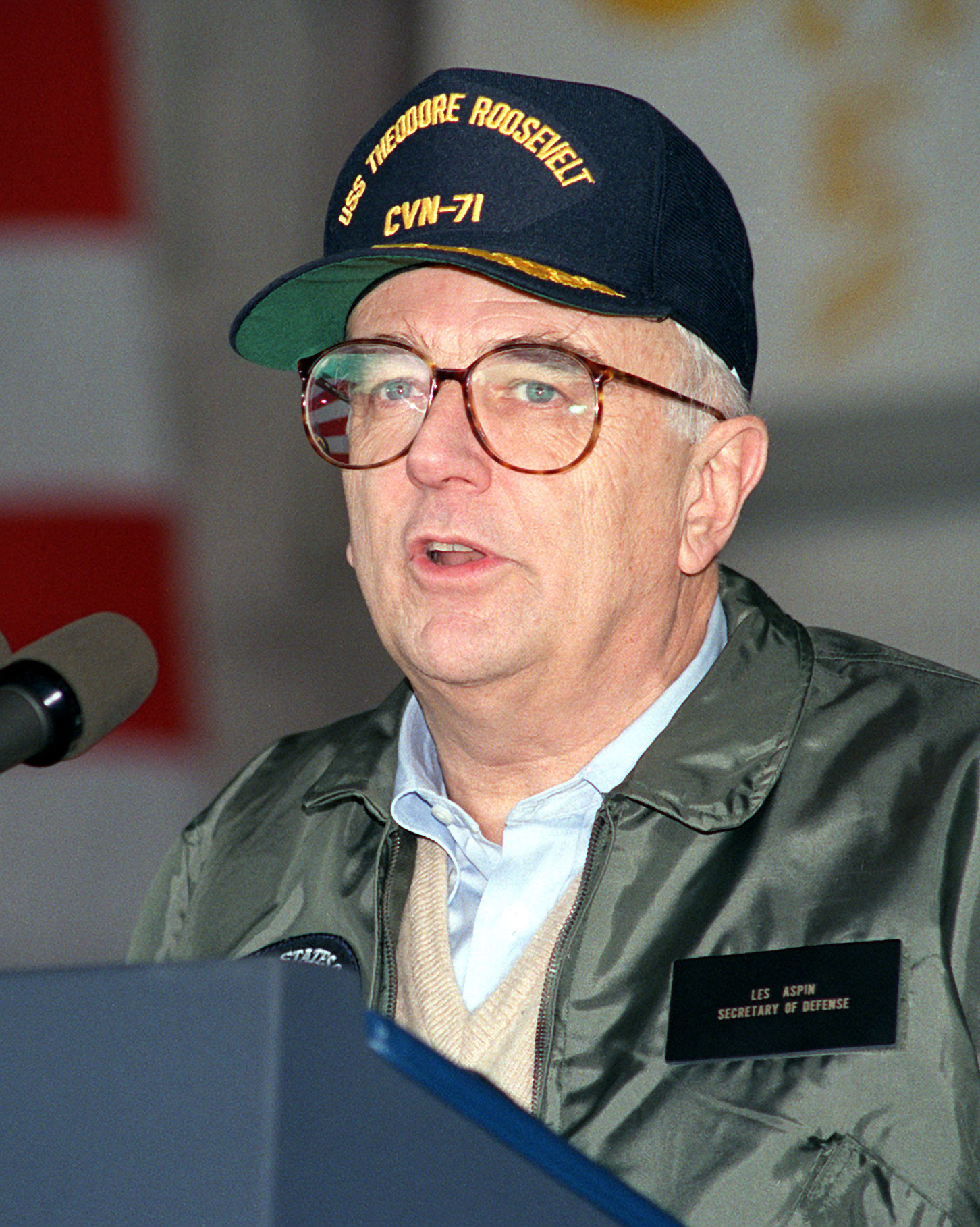
Aspin speaking aboard USS Theodore Roosevelt in 1993

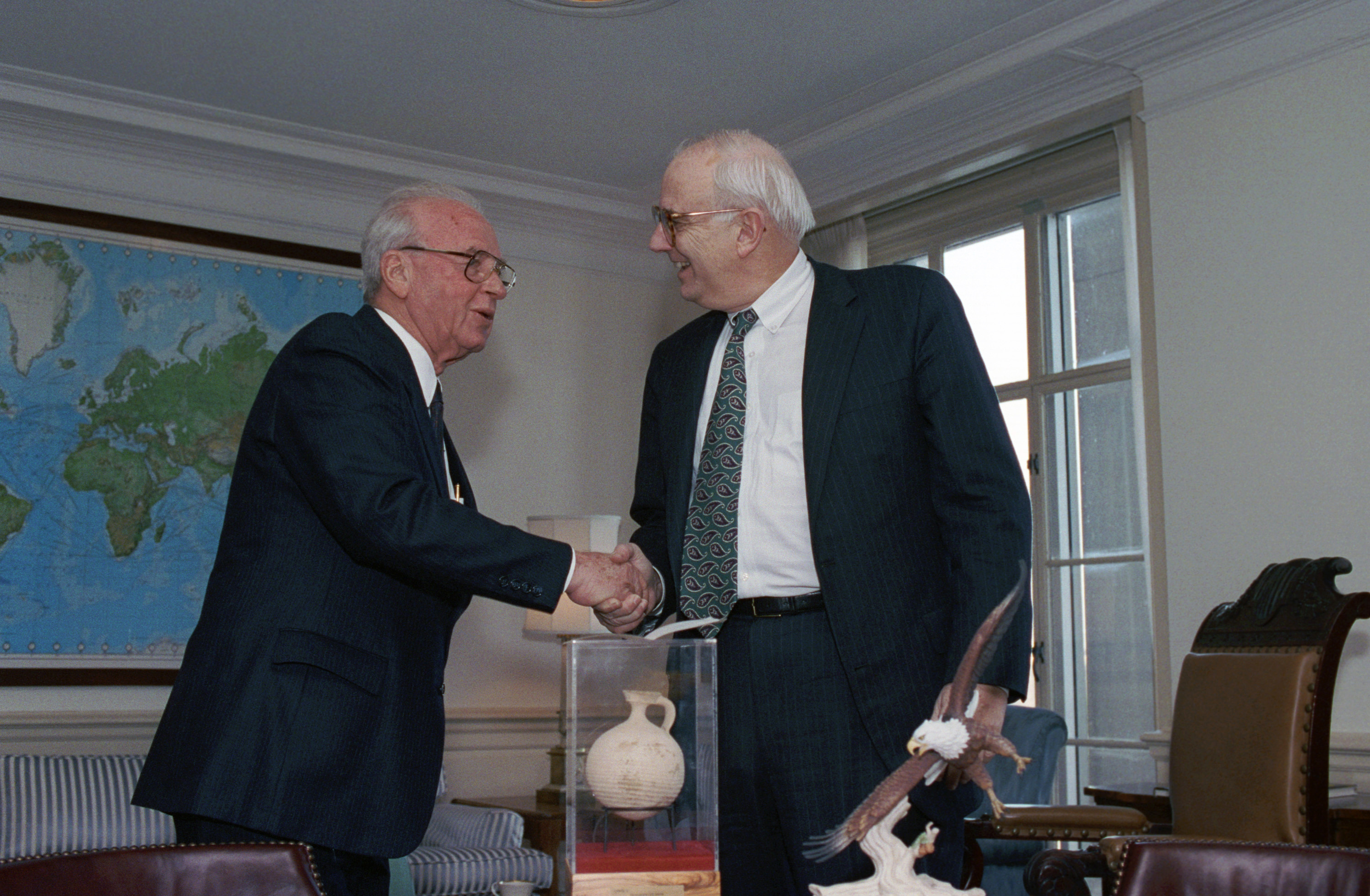
Aspin shakes hands with Israeli Prime Minister Yitzhak Rabin in 1993

Aspin served as an adviser to Clinton on defense matters during the 1992 presidential campaign. Given Clinton's lack of military experience, appointment of a prominent and respected defense expert to head The Pentagon seemed desirable. Because of his leadership position in the House, Aspin's views on defense issues were well known. He was skeptical about the Strategic Defense Initiative, and favored a smaller Navy, a cut in U.S. troops in Europe, and further reduction of military personnel strength. These positions, along with the assumption that Aspin would work toward a substantial cut in the Defense budget, worried the military. Defense industry leaders applauded Aspin's selection because he favored maintaining a viable defense industrial base. Although questioned extensively, Aspin won easy confirmation in the Senate.

=== Agenda and early difficulties ===
"Shortly after he took office, Aspin discussed dangers that had emerged with the end of the Cold War: the uncertainty that reform could succeed in the former Soviet Union; the enhanced possibility that terrorists or terrorist states could acquire nuclear weapons; the likely proliferation of regional conflicts; and the failure to take adequate account of the impact of the state of the domestic economy on U.S. national security interests. Given these conditions and the end of the Cold War, it seemed clear that the Pentagon was entering a period of potentially profound change. Aspin looked like a sound choice to manage this change.

As it turned out, Aspin faced difficulties from the beginning. A serious heart ailment put him in the hospital for several days in February 1993, after barely a month in office. A month later he was back in the hospital for implantation of a heart pacemaker. Even so, he had to deal immediately with the highly charged question of homosexuals in the military, a controversy left over from his predecessor Dick Cheney's tenure. That had become an issue in the 1992 campaign, when Clinton had promised to end discrimination against homosexuals. During his confirmation hearings Aspin indicated that he would take action quickly, and on entering office he presented a plan to the president to discuss the matter with Congress and the Joint Chiefs of Staff and presented a timetable leading to an order dealing with the matter. This plan provoked widespread protest from all sides on the issue."

=== Gender and sexuality in the military ===
The fallout from the controversy wounded both Clinton and Aspin politically and dragged on until December 1993, when, after many months of equivocation, confusion, and more controversy, Aspin released new regulations, known as the "Don't ask, don't tell" policy on homosexual conduct in the armed forces: Applicants for the services would not be asked about their sexual orientation, and homosexual orientation would not disqualify anyone from service "unless manifested by homosexual conduct"; military personnel would be judged on suitability for service, not sexual orientation; separation from the service would be based on homosexual acts, same sex marriage, or statements by an individual that he or she was bisexual or homosexual, with the person accorded the opportunity to rebut the presumption of homosexual acts; DoD criminal investigation or law enforcement organizations would not investigate solely to determine a service member's sexual orientation, and sexual orientation questions would not be included in personnel security questionnaires; finally, service members would be informed of DoD policy on sexual conduct during their training. This compromise policy, issued after an agonizing and divisive public debate, did not completely satisfy any of the concerned parties.

Also on the social side, Aspin had to deal with the volatile question of service women in combat. In April 1993 he announced a revised policy on the assignment of women in the armed forces: The services were to allow women to compete for assignments in combat aircraft; the Navy was to open additional ships to women and draft a proposal for Congress to remove existing legislative barriers to the assignment of women to combat vessels; and the Army and Marine Corps were to look for opportunities for women to serve in such components as field artillery and air defense. (This was a response to recommendations made by an ad hoc committee chaired by Barbara S. Pope appointed in the wake of the Tailhook scandal.) Meanwhile, Secretary of the Air Force Sheila E. Widnall became the first woman service secretary.

=== Defense budget and "bottom-up review" ===
Development of the Defense budget for FY 1994, beginning on 1 October 1993, remained Aspin's biggest task. The budget process proved more complicated than usual, owing to Clinton's campaign pledge to reduce DoD funding and to a "bottom-up review" of the military structure ordered by Aspin shortly after he took office. The end of the Cold War and the consequent opportunity to cut military costs clearly called for the kind of reevaluation of ends and means that the bottom-up review might contribute. A Pentagon steering group chaired by Under Secretary of Defense (Acquisition and Technology) John M. Deutch and including representatives from various OSD offices, the Joint Staff, and the services conducted the review.

Because of the growing threat of regional conflicts, Aspin wanted to have a strong capability to carry out limited military operations, including peacekeeping, and to maintain "a strong peacetime presence of U.S. forces around the world". The bottom-up review report, which Aspin released in September 1993, took into account strategy formulation, force structure, weapon systems modernization, and Defense infrastructure. The report projected a reduced force structure still capable of fighting and winning two simultaneous major regional conflicts. Forces would include 10 active Army divisions; 11 carrier battle groups, 45 to 55 attack submarines, and about 345 ships; 5 active Marine brigades; and 13 active and 7 reserve Air Force fighter wings. The report also called for additional prepositioned equipment and airlift/sealift capacity, improved anti-armor and precision-guided munitions, and enhanced Army National Guard combat brigade readiness.

The conclusions of the bottom-up review influenced the development of the FY 1994 Defense budget, although detailed work on the budget had begun as soon as Aspin took office. In March 1993 Aspin introduced a FY 1994 budget proposal costing $263.4 billion, about $12 billion below current levels, and reflecting cuts in the military services similar to those later included in the bottom-up review. To some critics of high military spending, Aspin's budget plan differed little from that of the Bush administration.

In the fall of 1993 Aspin began to tell the White House that the five-year Defense budget, reflecting the results of the bottom-up review, would exceed the more than $1 trillion projected by the Clinton administration. In December 1993 he put the anticipated shortfall at no less than $50 billion, the consequence of inaccurate inflation estimates, a military pay raise, and failure to account for other Pentagon costs, including peacekeeping operations. The size of the force needed to meet the two regional wars scenario contributed to the projected budget shortfall. Furthermore, Aspin was on record as favoring the use of U.S. troops in regional conflicts, as opposed to other decisionmakers, including General Colin Powell, chairman of the JCS. Aspin's departure from office early in 1994 left further decisions on the Defense budget to his successor. The final FY 1994 budget amounted to a little under $252 billion in total obligational authority.

Like his predecessors Carlucci and Cheney, Aspin faced the perennial issue of base closures, which could also affect the Defense budget. In March 1993 he released a plan to close an additional 31 large military installations and to shrink or consolidate 134 other sites, projecting a savings of over $3 billion a year beginning in 2000. A new Defense Base Closure and Realignment Commission approved the proposal, which went into effect when Congress accepted it as a package.

The SDI program also held important budget implications. In May 1993 Aspin announced "the end of the Star Wars era," explaining that the collapse of the Soviet Union had determined the fate of SDI. He renamed the Strategic Defense Initiative Organization as the Ballistic Missile Defense Organization (BMDO) and established its priorities as theater and national missile defense and useful follow-on technologies. Aspin's assignment of responsibility for BMDO to the under secretary of defense (acquisition and technology) signified the downgrading of the program.

=== Global crises and initiatives ===
While seeking solutions to the complex budget and force structure issues, Aspin found himself beset with difficult regional problems and conflicts that demanded decisions and action. In NATO he pushed the U.S.-sponsored "Partnership for Peace" program to bring together NATO members and nonmembers for military activities, including training maneuvers, equipment sharing, search and rescue, antiterrorist efforts, environmental cleanup, and peacekeeping operations. At a meeting in Brussels in December 1993 the NATO defense ministers agreed to consider for future alliance membership those non-NATO nations that participated in the program. Russian president Boris Yeltsin warned that attempts to bring Eastern European nations into NATO would threaten his country's strategic interests and endanger hopes for the former Soviet bloc's reconciliation with the West. Yeltsin argued that enlarging NATO would reawaken old Russian concerns about encirclement and possibly weaken the cause of democratic reform.

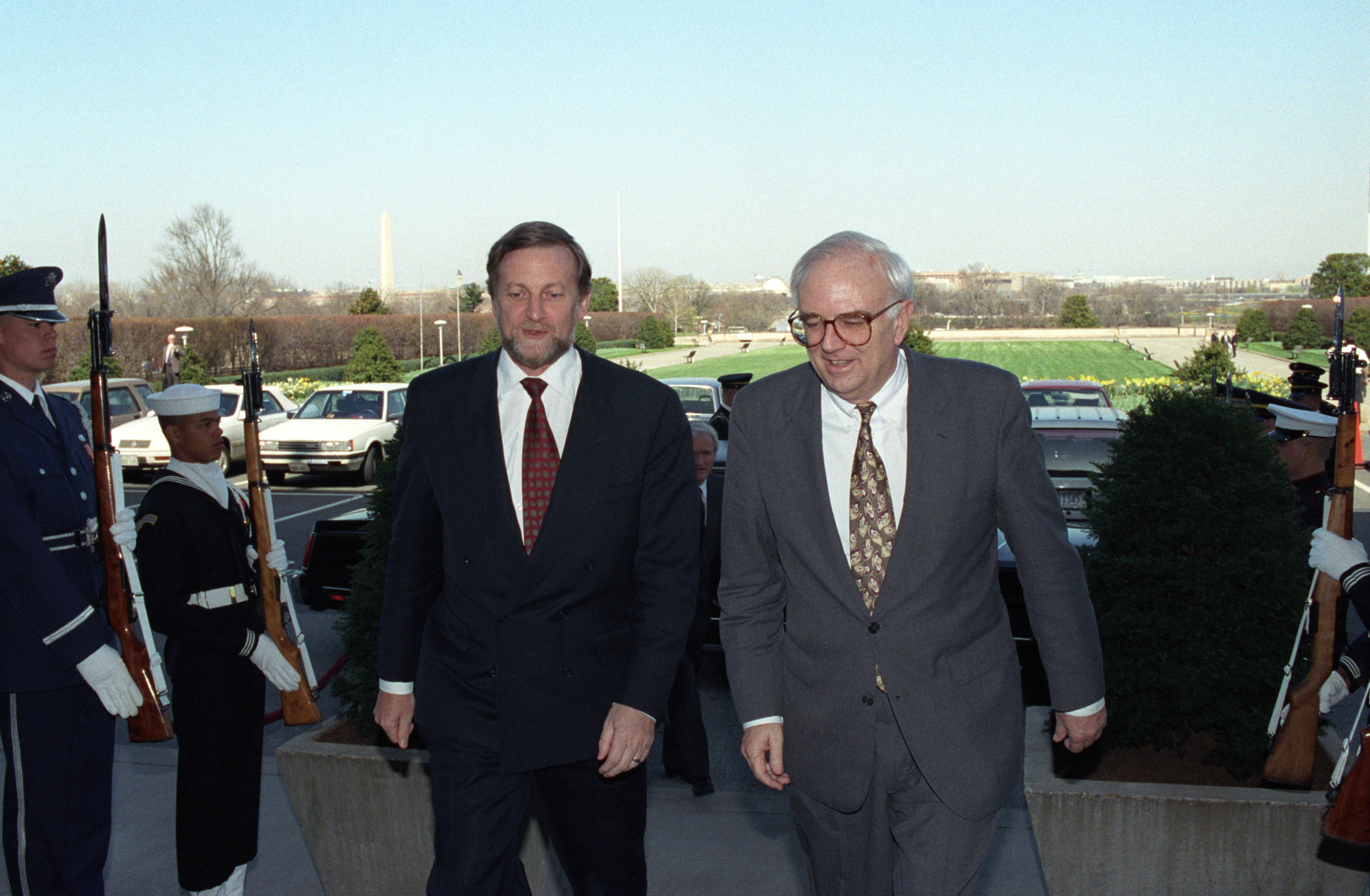
Aspin (right) with Australian foreign minister Gareth Evans in 1993.

The unstable situation in Haiti, where elected president Jean-Bertrand Aristide had been ousted from office by the military in September 1991, presented another regional problem. The United States pressured the military government to restore Aristide. In July 1993, the Haitian military regime agreed to reinstate Aristide by October 30, 1993, but then refused to step down. In October, in an effort Clinton approved even though Aspin opposed it, the United States sent the USS Harlan County carrying 200 troops to Port-au-Prince, Haiti's capital. Met by a hostile mob of armed Haitians, the ship turned away without attempting to undertake its mission, which the Pentagon described as an effort to professionalize the Haitian military and undertake civil assistance projects. Some observers attacked Aspin for not taking a harder stand in the administration against an action he opposed and then aborting the effort in the face of local opposition.

During Aspin's term the U.S. was concerned that Communist North Korea might have underway a nuclear weapons development program. This gave way to alarm when that country refused to allow full inspection of nuclear sites. In November 1993 North Korea demanded that the United States and South Korea cancel a planned joint training exercise as a precondition during discussions on the nuclear issue. Aspin rejected this demand and announced that the United States would suspend plans to withdraw its troops gradually from the peninsula.

In the Persian Gulf area, Iraq remained a problem. In June 1993 two U.S. Navy ships fired Tomahawk missiles against the headquarters building of Iraq's intelligence service in Baghdad in response to evidence of a plot to assassinate former President Bush during a visit to Kuwait. Aspin described the attack as a "wake up call" for Saddam Hussein. Two months later Aspin received a report on the U.S. military performance during the 1991 Gulf War, the result of a study undertaken by the House Armed Services Committee when he chaired it. The report concluded that the U.S. Central Command had greatly exaggerated damage done to Iraqi military equipment, such as tanks and naval vessels, by air strikes. Aspin also had to consider the question of health problems of U.S. service personnel who participated in the action against Iraq. He announced that a preliminary review disclosed no connection between chemical weapon agents and the reported health problems. Nevertheless, he formed a panel of outside experts to examine the issue further.

The worsening crisis in Bosnia commanded attention and demanded some kind of U.S. response. Aspin did not favor using ground forces to intervene in the civil war involving the Bosnian Muslims, Serbs, and Croats, but thought that the use of sophisticated weapons was a more reasonable option. Eventually the administration decided on an airdrop of humanitarian aid, even though Aspin did not favor the plan.

Somalia turned out to be Aspin's biggest headache. A civil war involving various clans had engulfed the country since 1991. Direct U.S. involvement, begun in August 1992, provided food through a military airlift and other means to the people of Somalia. In December 1992, shortly before Aspin became secretary of defense, the United States joined a new Unified Task Force (UNITAF) to provide security as well as food relief. The United States sent 26,000 troops to Somalia to join about 13,000 others from more than 20 nations. UNITAF, operating until May 1993, restored order in Somalia and distributed food widely.

In March 1993, United Nations Operation in Somalia II began in an effort to create conditions to enable the Somalis to rebuild the country. The United States cut its troops in Somalia to some 4,000 and then added 400 Army Rangers in August 1993. At that time, confronting criticism at home that the United States was getting more deeply involved in the factional violence in Somalia without a clear rationale, Aspin explained that U.S. troops would remain until order had been restored in Mogadishu, Somalia's capital, progress had been made in disarming rival clans, and effective police forces were operating in the country's major cities. At the same time the United States increased its military efforts against a leading Somali warlord, Mohamed Farrah Aidid.

=== Criticism and final days in office ===
In September 1993, General Powell asked Aspin to approve the request of the U.S. commander in Somalia for tanks, armored vehicles and AC-130 Spectre gunships for his forces. Aspin turned down the request and did not take Powell's request seriously. At some point during a lunch meeting, Powell presented to Aspin on the need of additional tanks, armored vehicles, AC-130 Spectre gunships air-support to support the U.S. Troops that were about to be deployed for Battle of Mogadishu and, discussing the battle preparation instead of paying attention to Powell's recommendation, Aspin caused Powell to grow more irritated. This was believed to be the primary reason for Powell's early departure as Chairman of the Joint Chiefs of Staff. Shortly thereafter Aidid's forces in Mogadishu killed 18 U.S. soldiers and wounded more than 75 in attacks that also resulted in the shooting down of two U.S. helicopters and the capture of one pilot in the Battle of Mogadishu. In the face of severe congressional criticism, Aspin admitted that in view of what had happened he had made a mistake, but stated that the request for armored equipment had been made within the context of delivering humanitarian aid to Somalia rather than protecting troops. In an appearance before a congressional committee to answer questions about the Somalia disaster, Aspin made an unfavorable impression and appeared weak in response to the detailed probing and criticism of his performance. The president publicly defended Aspin but made clear that the White House was not involved in the decision not to send armor reinforcements to Somalia. Several members of Congress called on Clinton to ask for Aspin's resignation.

In September 1993, Les Aspin faced additional criticism related to his participation in a NATO defense ministers’ meeting in Venice, amid ongoing U.S. military operations in Somalia. Media reports noted that Aspin was accompanied on the trip by his romantic partner, and that elements of the visit included formal dinners and cultural activities held in historic Venetian venues.

Questions were raised in the press and by political critics regarding the appropriateness of the trip’s optics and whether public funds were used to support non-official leisure activities. The Department of Defense stated that Aspin’s companion traveled at her own expense and that official funds were used only for authorized government purposes related to the NATO meeting. Pentagon officials further emphasized that the conference had been scheduled in advance and was conducted as part of routine alliance business.

Although no formal findings of misuse of public funds were made, the episode intensified scrutiny of Aspin’s judgment and leadership during a period of heightened sensitivity following U.S. casualties in Somalia. The Venice controversy became part of a broader pattern of criticism surrounding Aspin’s tenure, contributing to political pressure that preceded his resignation later that year.

On 15 December 1993 President Clinton announced Aspin's resignation, for personal reasons. Given the problems that Aspin encountered during his short term, most obviously the losses in Mogadishu, observers assumed that the president had asked him to step down. Speculation in the media centered on the Somalia embarrassment and on Aspin's differences with the Office of Management and Budget over how much the Defense budget should be cut. The secretary's health problems may well have also been a factor. One news magazine stated that Aspin's major handicap was "neither his famously unmilitary bearing nor his inability to discipline himself or the enormous Pentagon bureaucracy; it is his politician's instinct for the middle ground on defense issues." Aspin continued to serve as Secretary of Defense until February 3, 1994, when William Perry took office.

After Aspin's resignation, a number of observers would come to his defense about his job performance. This included Newsweek, who said the real fault for the events in Somalia lay with the United Nations.

== Final months and death ==
After leaving his position, Aspin joined the faculty of Marquette University's international affairs program in Washington and joined the board of directors of the Washington-based think-tank the Henry L. Stimson Center. In March, he became a member of the Commission on Roles and Missions, and in May Clinton chose him to be chairman of the president's Foreign Intelligence Advisory Board. In March 1995, he began work as chairman of the study group on the Roles and Capabilities of the Intelligence Community (Aspin–Brown Commission).

Aspin had had increasing difficulty during the last years of his life with a congenital heart condition (asymmetric septal hypertrophy; hypertrophic cardiomyopathy/obstructive cardiomyopathy). It necessitated hospitalization during his tenure as Defense Secretary, with placement of a pacemaker. His cardiac disorder was complicated in May 1995 by a stroke, which resulted in his death on May 21, 1995, in Washington, D.C. He is interred at Brookfield's Wisconsin Memorial Park cemetery.

Marquette University named its Les Aspin Center for Government in his honor.

== Electoral history ==
=== U.S. House (1970–1992) ===
Year	Election	Date	Elected				Defeated				Total	Plurality
1970	Primary	Sep. 8	Les Aspin	Democratic	15,185	39.83%	Doug La Follette	Dem.	15,165	39.78%	38,124	20
1970	Primary	Sep. 8	Les Aspin	Democratic	15,185	39.83%	Gerald T. Flynn	Dem.	6,130	16.08%	38,124	20
1970	Primary	Sep. 8	Les Aspin	Democratic	15,185	39.83%	Perry J. Anderson	Dem.	1,644	4.31%	38,124	20
1970	General	Nov. 3	Les Aspin	Democratic	87,428	60.93%	Henry Schadeberg (inc)	Rep.	56,067	39.07%	143,495	31,361
1972	Primary	Sep. 12	Les Aspin (inc)	Democratic	28,211	90.55%	Gerald H. Janca	Dem.	2,943	9.45%	31,154	25,268
1972	General	Nov. 7	Les Aspin (inc)	Democratic	122,973	64.41%	Merrill E. Stalbaum	Rep.	66,665	34.91%	190,937	56,308
1972	General	Nov. 7	Les Aspin (inc)	Democratic	122,973	64.41%	Charles J. Fortner	Amer.	1,299	0.68%	190,937	56,308
1974	General	Nov. 5	Les Aspin (inc)	Democratic	81,902	70.49%	Leonard W. Smith	Rep.	34,288	29.51%	116,190	47,614
1976	General	Nov. 2	Les Aspin (inc)	Democratic	136,162	64.90%	William W. Petrie	Rep.	71,427	34.05%	209,794	64,735
1976	General	Nov. 2	Les Aspin (inc)	Democratic	136,162	64.90%	Eugene Zimmerman	Amer.	2,205	1.05%	209,794	64,735
1978	General	Nov. 7	Les Aspin (inc)	Democratic	77,146	54.49%	William W. Petrie	Rep.	64,437	45.51%	141,583	12,709
1980	General	Nov. 4	Les Aspin (inc)	Democratic	126,222	56.24%	Kathryn H. Canary	Rep.	96,047	42.79%	224,437	30,175
1980	General	Nov. 4	Les Aspin (inc)	Democratic	126,222	56.24%	Arthur F. Jackson	Lib.	2,168	0.97%	224,437	30,175
1982	General	Nov. 2	Les Aspin (inc)	Democratic	95,055	61.01%	Peter N. Jansson	Rep.	59,309	38.07%	155,802	35,746
1982	General	Nov. 2	Les Aspin (inc)	Democratic	95,055	61.01%	Arthur F. Jackson	Lib.	1,438	0.92%	155,802	35,746
1984	General	Nov. 6	Les Aspin (inc)	Democratic	76,384	65.07%	Robert V. Nolan	Rep.	41,007	34.93%	117,391	35,377
1986	General	Nov. 4	Les Aspin (inc)	Democratic	106,288	74.26%	Iris Peterson	Rep.	34,495	24.10%	143,137	71,793
1986	General	Nov. 4	Les Aspin (inc)	Democratic	106,288	74.26%	John Graf	L&F	2,354	1.64%	143,137	71,793
1988	General	Nov. 8	Les Aspin (inc)	Democratic	158,552	76.16%	Bernard J. Weaver	Rep.	49,620	23.84%	208,172	108,932
1990	General	Nov. 6	Les Aspin (inc)	Democratic	93,961	100.0%					93,961	93,961
1992	General	Nov. 3	Les Aspin (inc)	Democratic	147,495	57.56%	Mark Neumann	Rep.	104,352	40.72%	256,238	43,143
1992	General	Nov. 3	Les Aspin (inc)	Democratic	147,495	57.56%	John Graf	Ind.	4,391	1.71%	256,238	43,143

U.S. House of Representatives
Preceded by Henry Schadeberg	Member from Wisconsin's 1st congressional district 1971–1993	Succeeded by Peter Barca
Preceded by Melvin Price	Chair of the House Armed Services Committee; 1985–1993	Succeeded by Ron Dellums
Political offices
Preceded by Dick Cheney	United States Secretary of Defense; 1993–1994	Succeeded by William Perry
Government offices
Preceded by William Crowe	Chair of the President's Intelligence Advisory Board; 1994–1995	Succeeded by Warren Rudman; Acting
