= Lynn E. Stalbaum =

American politician

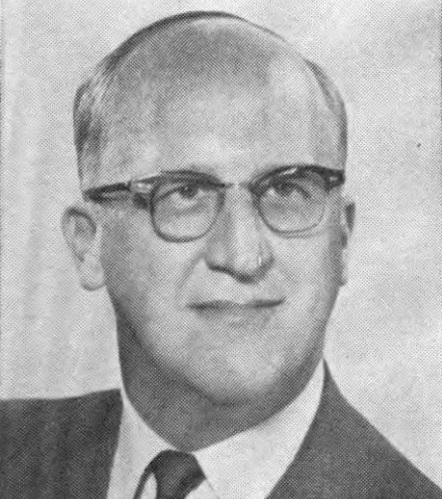

Member of the U.S. House of Representatives from Wisconsin's 1st district
- In office January 3, 1965 – January 3, 1967
- Preceded by: Henry Schadeberg
- Succeeded by: Henry Schadeberg

Member of the Wisconsin Senate from the 21st district
- In office January 3, 1955 – January 3, 1965
- Preceded by: Gerald T. Flynn
- Succeeded by: Henry Dorman

Personal details
- Born: Lynn Ellsworth Stalbaum; May 15, 1920 Norway, Wisconsin, U.S.
- Died: June 17, 1999 (aged 79) George Washington University Hospital, Washington, D.C., U.S.
- Cause of death: Leukemia
- Resting place: Norway Cemetery, Norway, Wisconsin
- Party: Democratic
- Spouse: Alice Gunderson (m. 1950; died 1984)
- Children: 4
- Relatives: Merrill E. Stalbaum (brother)

Military service
- Allegiance: United States
- Branch/service: United States Navy
- Years of service: 1944–1946
- Battles/wars: World War II: Pacific War

Lynn Ellsworth Stalbaum (May 15, 1920 – June 17, 1999) was an American farmer, businessman, World War II veteran and Democratic politician from Racine County, Wisconsin. He served one term in the United States House of Representatives, representing Wisconsin's 1st congressional district in the 89th Congress from 1965 to 1967.

He previously served ten years in the Wisconsin Senate. His elder brother, Merrill E. Stalbaum, served in the Wisconsin State Assembly.

== Biography ==
Stalbaum was born on a farm in the town of Norway, Wisconsin, near Waterford, in Racine County. He attended the rural public schools and graduated from the Racine County Agricultural School in 1936. He was employed with the United States Department of Agriculture in Racine County from 1936 to 1944, working on the New Deal Agricultural Adjustment Act program, and serving as administrative officer from 1937.

=== World War II ===
In 1944, he enlisted in the United States Navy, in the midst of World War II. He served in the Pacific War aboard a U.S. Navy destroyer and participated in the invasion of Luzon in 1945. He was discharged after the end of the war, in 1946, and returned to Wisconsin, where he worked for several years as a feed salesman.

=== Early career ===
He was secretary-treasurer of the Racine Milk Producers Cooperative Association and manager of the Harmony Dairy Co. from 1951 to 1964.

In 1954 he was elected to the Wisconsin State Senate (reelected in 1958 and 1962), where he served as caucus chairman in 1957, 1959, and 1961, and as assistant minority leader in 1963.

=== Congress ===
In 1964, Stalbaum announced that he would challenge incumbent Republican congressman Henry C. Schadeberg. He faced a competitive primary and defeated former state senator Gerald T. Flynn with 55% of the vote. He then went on to upset Schadeberg in the 1964 general election, receiving 51.5% of the general election vote in a Democratic wave year.

During his service in the 89th Congress (January 3, 1965 – January 3, 1967) he sponsored bills on consumer protection, clean water, and GI benefits.

Stalbaum ran for re-election in 1966 and faced a rematch with former congressman Henry C. Schadeberg. The political climate in 1966 was far less favorable for Democrats, and Stalbaum was narrowly defeated, receiving 49% of the vote.

=== Later career ===
Two years later, Stalbaum made one final attempt to return to office, challenging Schadeberg again. He prevailed in another competitive primary, and the general election rematch produced another close result, but Schadeberg retained his seat, winning just under 51% of the vote. The Vietnam War was a major issue in the 1968 election. Stalbaum had been a reluctant supporter of President Lyndon Johnson's war policies during his term in office, but was advocating a change in strategy in 1968. His primary opponent, Racine teacher Jerald Maiers, a supporter of Eugene McCarthy, asserted that Stalbaum's previous support for the war was disqualifying.

=== Retirement ===
After losing in 1968, Stalbaum remained in the Washington, D.C., area and resided in Bethesda, Maryland, for the rest of his life. He worked as a legislative consultant to rural electric and dairy cooperatives from 1968 until his retirement in 1985.

== Personal life and family ==
Lynn Stalbaum was the youngest of three children born to John Martin and Amanda (née Ebert) Stalbaum. Both parents were natives of Wisconsin, and the Stalbaum farm had belonged to the family since 1854. Lynn's older brother, Merrill E. Stalbaum, also served in the Wisconsin Legislature as a member of the Wisconsin State Assembly and overlapped with Lynn Stalbaum's service during the 1961 and 1963 legislative sessions, making them the only siblings to serve together in the Wisconsin Legislature until Scott and Jeff Fitzgerald in 2001–2013. Unlike the Fitzgerald brothers, Merrill and Lynn Stalbaum had opposing political beliefs and often clashed.

Lynn Stalbaum married Alice Gunderson on April 29, 1950. They had two sons and two daughters and were married for 34 years before her death from cancer in 1984.

== Death ==
Lynn Stalbaum died at George Washington University Hospital in Washington, D.C., on June 17, 1999, due to complications from leukemia.

== Electoral history ==
=== Wisconsin Senate (1954, 1958, 1962) ===
Year	Election	Date	Elected				Defeated				Total	Plurality
1954	General	Nov. 2	Lynn E. Stalbaum	Democratic	22,892	55.61%	Carl C. Christensen	Rep.	18,273	44.39%	41,165	4,619
1958	General	Nov. 4	Lynn E. Stalbaum (inc)	Democratic	27,916	64.80%	Richard G. Harvey	Rep.	15,164	35.20%	43,080	12,752
1962	General	Nov. 6	Lynn E. Stalbaum (inc)	Democratic	28,549	61.45%	Richard G. Harvey	Rep.	17,910	38.55%	46,459	10,639

=== U.S. House (1964, 1966, 1968) ===
Year	Election	Date	Elected				Defeated				Total	Plurality
1964	Primary	Sep. 8	Lynn E. Stalbaum	Democratic	20,293	55.44%	Gerald T. Flynn	Dem.	16,310	44.56%	36,603	3,983
1964	General	Nov. 6	Lynn E. Stalbaum	Democratic	90,450	51.52%	Henry C. Schadeberg (inc)	Rep.	85,117	48.48%	175,567	5,333
1966	General	Nov. 8	Henry C. Schadeberg	Republican	65,041	51.04%	Lynn E. Stalbaum (inc)	Dem.	62,398	48.96%	127,439	2,643
1968	Primary	Sep. 10	Lynn E. Stalbaum	Democratic	18,215	73.50%	Jerald E. Maiers	Dem.	6,567	26.50%	24,782	11,648
1968	General	Nov. 5	Henry C. Schadeberg (inc)	Republican	89,200	50.89%	Lynn E. Stalbaum	Dem.	86,067	49.11%	175,267	3,133

Wisconsin Senate
Preceded by Gerald T. Flynn	Member of the Wisconsin Senate from the 21st district January 3, 1955 – January 3, 1965	Succeeded by Henry Dorman
U.S. House of Representatives
Preceded by Henry C. Schadeberg	Member of the U.S. House of Representatives from Wisconsin's 1st congressional district January 3, 1965 – January 3, 1967	Succeeded by Henry Schadeberg
