= Eddie Race =

American football coach

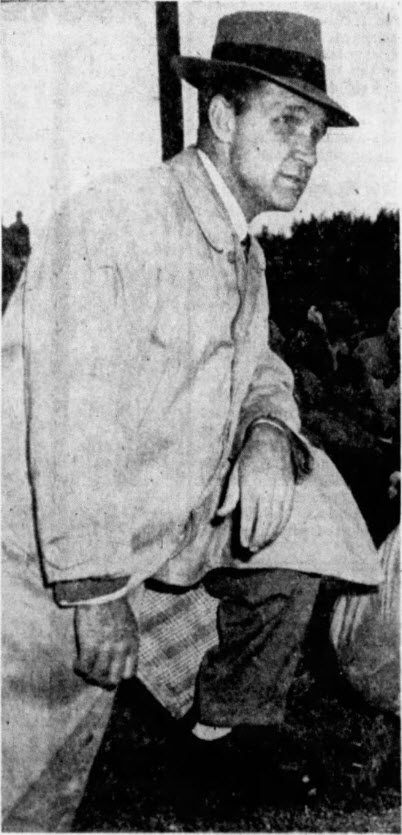
Eddie Race in 1958

Edward Joseph Race (22 October 1914 – 23 May 2005) was an American football coach from Pittsburgh, Pennsylvania.

== Early life ==
Race was born in Pittsburgh, Pennsylvania and later moved to Milwaukee. He was active in sports throughout his high school career and won multiple honors for basketball. In 1933, he was recruited by Loyola Marymount University where he played football and hockey. As the goalkeeper, he helped the Loyola Hockey team to a 47-5-2 record and two Hoover Cup Championships. He graduated in 1937 with a B.S. in Philosophy and English. He was also cast as a hockey player in the 1937 film The Game That Kills.

== Coaching career ==
- From 1938 to 1941, he taught and established the athletic program at St. Benedict the Moor School in Milwaukee, coaching football, and basketball.
- From 1941 to 1947, he taught and coached football, hockey, boxing, and baseball at Messmer High School (Milwaukee).
- In 1947–1948, he coached football, hockey, boxing, and baseball at St. Francis Minor Seminary (now Saint Thomas More High School (Milwaukee)).
- In 1948, he was head coach of the Racine Bees, a semi professional football club.
- At St. Catherine's High School (Racine, Wisconsin), from 1948 to 1961, Race was the head coach for football (80-31-6) and baseball, and the assistant basketball coach. In that time, his football teams produce six Catholic conference championships (1948, '49,'53,'55,'56,'57) and went undefeated for three seasons straight (1955, 1956, 1957), which set a city record for championships in-a-row and winning streak (24 games).
- In 1961, he coached football at Casimir Pulaski High School in Milwaukee. The next year, he moved to Cudahy High School, coaching football and volleyball until 1969, retiring from there in 1983.
- In the summers, he taught at Knute Rockne summer camp in northern Wisconsin.

== Awards and honors ==
- Wisconsin Football Coaches Association Hall of Fame 1996
- Loyola Marymount University Hall of Fame 1993
- St. Thomas More High School Alumni Hall of Fame 1996
- St. Thomas More High School Athletic Hall of Fame 1997
- St. Catherine's High School Hall of Fame 1998
- 1985 named "One of the Most Interesting People in Town" by Milwaukee Magazine
