= Eugene "Scrapiron" Young =

American coach and trainer (1903–1987)

Eugene John "Scrapiron" Young (June 21, 1903 – January 7, 1987) was an American writer, professional trainer, coach, and attorney.

== Early life and education ==
Eugene Young was born in Dover, Ohio on June 21, 1903, to an Italian mother and an English father. His father died when Eugene was six years old.

He worked eight hours a day at a steel mill, and was still able to put himself through high school, graduating in two years. He was also able to still play school sports, being a member of the football, basketball, and baseball teams.

In the fall of 1923 he entered into the University of Notre Dame, and broke his leg during tryouts for the football team, but went on to join the track team, breaking the school's 1- and 2- mile records.

In June 1927, he graduated from Notre Dame Law School, receiving the Byron V. Kanaley Award (athlete with highest scholastic average) and magna cum laude honors.

== Coaching career ==
In the fall of 1927, on the advice of Knute Rockne, he accepted the athletic director and head coaching job at St. Catherine's High School in Racine, Wisconsin, and taught algebra and physical education. As football coach with a 22-5-3 career record, he led his team to an undefeated season in 1929. As basketball coach with a 60-17 career record, he led the team to three consecutive invitations to the National Catholic Interscholastic Basketball Tournament.

== Personal life ==
On February 9, 1930, he married Mary Agnes Pfaffl at St. Patrick's Roman Catholic Church in Racine.

== Athletic training career ==
In the fall of 1930, Rockne hired Young to be Notre Dame's first head athletic trainer. He held that position for 21 years, quitting in 1945 to spend time on his pecan farm in Covington, Louisiana. There, he started a boys' camp for religious order. Later that year he was hired as head trainer of the Detroit Lions, and in 1946 he was hired by the Chicago Rockets. In 1947, he was hired by the University of San Francisco as their athletic trainer. In 1951, his book "With Rockne at Notre Dame" was published by G. P. Putnam's Sons.

== Death and burial ==
He died on January 7, 1987, in Shawnee, Oklahoma, and was buried at Holy Cross Cemetery in Racine, Wisconsin.
