= Randolph H. Runden =

American farmer and politician

Randolph H. Runden (August 27, 1897 – December 15, 1964) was an American farmer and politician.

Born in Chicago, Illinois, Runden received his bachelor's degree from University of Wisconsin–Madison and was a farmer in the town of Norway in Racine County, Wisconsin. Runden served on the Town of Norway Board and was town chairman. He also served on the Racine County Board of Supervisors and was chairman of the board. Runden was also commissioner of the Norway-Dover Drainage District and was a Republican. From 1941 to 1949. Runden served in the Wisconsin State Assembly. Runden died in Racine, Wisconsin.
