= John Hansen (Wisconsin politician) =

American politician

John R. Hansen (August 28, 1917 – May 1, 2015) was an American politician who was a member of the Wisconsin State Assembly. He was a Democrat.

He was born in Raymond, Wisconsin. Later, he resided in Franksville, Wisconsin.

== Career ==
Hansen was elected to the Assembly in 1958. Previously, he had been an unsuccessful candidate for the seat in 1956. Additionally, he was a member of the Raymond School Board from 1940 to 1945, the Raymond Town Board from 1945 to 1948 and the Racine County, Wisconsin Board from 1951 to 1958.
