= National Register of Historic Places listings in Racine County, Wisconsin =

Location of Racine County in Wisconsin

This is a list of the National Register of Historic Places listings in Racine County, Wisconsin. It is intended to provide a comprehensive listing of entries in the National Register of Historic Places that are located in Racine County, Wisconsin. The locations of National Register properties for which the latitude and longitude coordinates are included below may be seen in a map.

There are 59 properties and districts listed on the National Register in the county.

This National Park Service list is complete through NPS recent listings posted September 4, 2026.

== Current listings ==
	Name on the Register	Image	Date listed	Location	City or town	Description
1	Badger Building	Badger Building	December 3, 1980 (#80000174)	610 Main St. 42°43′36″N 87°46′58″W	Racine	1915 Prairie style office building designed by Edmund Bailey Funston to house the Tidyman Candy Company.
2	Elam Beardsley Farmhouse	Elam Beardsley Farmhouse	March 1, 1982 (#82000699)	5601 Northwest Hwy. 42°47′28″N 88°15′45″W	Waterford	Italianate-styled farmhouse with hip roofs and walls of cobblestone and split-faced fieldstone, with cut-stone quoins, built about 1855. Beardsley was one of the first settlers of Racine County, arriving over 20 years before building this house.
3	Burlington Cemetery Chapel	Burlington Cemetery Chapel	October 9, 2013 (#13000824)	701 S. Browns Lake Dr. 42°40′56″N 88°15′35″W	Burlington	Richardsonian Romanesque-styled chapel built in 1922.
4	Burlington Community Swimming Pools and Bathhouse	Burlington Community Swimming Pools and Bathhouse	October 23, 2013 (#13000850)	394 Amanda St. 42°40′48″N 88°17′10″W	Burlington	Public swimming pool facility, designed by Carl Iverson in mid-20th century style and built in 1965. The bathhouse is a notable early user of precast concrete joists, made by the Burlington firm J.W. Peters & Sons.
5	Burlington Downtown Historic District	Burlington Downtown Historic District	June 2, 2000 (#00000603)	Roughly bounded by E. Jefferson, N. Pine, E. Washington, E. Chestnut, N. Dodge, Commerce, Mill, and W. Chestnut Sts. 42°40′49″N 88°16′37″W	Burlington	Burlington's old downtown, with buildings ranging from the 1868 Italianate-styled Jones Block, to the 1895 Queen Anne Finke & Co. Block, to the 1909 Classical Revival Bank of Burlington, to the 1916 20th Century Commercial Agner Garage, to the 1926 English cottage-like Hansen Oil Co. Filling Station.
6	John Collins House	John Collins House	November 20, 1974 (#74000119)	6409 Nicholson Rd. 42°48′20″N 87°53′40″W	Caledonia	Frame Greek Revival-styled home built in 1853, with a full temple front with four Doric columns supporting a large pediment. Wing added around 1873.
7	Eli R. Cooley House	Eli R. Cooley House	April 11, 1973 (#73000273)	1135 S. Main St. 42°43′09″N 87°46′55″W	Racine	Designed by Lucas Bradley and built in the early 1850s, this house has been described as "Wisconsin's finest remaining Greek Revival residence."
8	Thomas Driver and Sons Manufacturing Company	Thomas Driver and Sons Manufacturing Company	July 14, 2004 (#04000713)	134 S. Main St., 214 State St. 42°43′55″N 87°47′03″W	Racine	Factory complex, comprising the 1882 4-story former Star Roller Mills, the 1888 Driver office building, and the 1896 Driver Planing Mill, Sash, Door and Blind Factory.
9	First Presbyterian Church	First Presbyterian Church	March 20, 1973 (#73000093)	716 College Ave. 42°43′32″N 87°47′07″W	Racine	Stately Greek Revival Presbyterian church designed by Lucas Bradley and built 1851-52.
10	Gold Medal Camp Furniture Company	Gold Medal Camp Furniture Company	May 7, 2019 (#100003915)	1700-1701 Packard Ave. 42°42′39″N 87°48′03″W	Racine	3-story brick-walled mill-type factory complex built from 1905 to 1924, where portable folding furniture was built: cots, chairs, tables, etc.
11	Chauncey Hall Building	Chauncey Hall Building	October 10, 1980 (#80000175)	338-340 Main St. 42°43′46″N 87°47′00″W	Racine	Queen Anne-styled red-brick commercial building designed by E. Townsend Mix and built in 1883 for banker Chauncey Hall to hold a store and restaurant or saloon on the 1st floor, offices on 2nd, and a hall on 3rd floor.
12	Chauncey Hall House	Chauncey Hall House	January 2, 1976 (#76000075)	1235 S. Main St. 42°43′04″N 87°46′55″W	Racine	Oldest Gothic Revival house in Racine, designed by A.J. Downing with picturesque irregular form and elaborate bargeboards and built before 1854 for Hall.
13	Hansen House	Hansen House	June 6, 1979 (#79000103)	1221 N. Main St. 42°44′10″N 87°47′04″W	Racine	Greek Revival house with cornice returns and a colonnaded porch built around 1855 by carpenter Thomas Fuller on a hill above Racine harbor. Occupants included ship captains and the harbormaster.
14	Thomas P. Hardy House	Thomas P. Hardy House	December 3, 1974 (#74000120)	1319 S. Main St. 42°42′59″N 87°46′55″W	Racine	1905 winged Prairie School house designed by Wright, running down the bluff above Lake Michigan.
15	Franklyn Hazelo House	Franklyn Hazelo House	December 30, 1974 (#74000121)	34108 Oak Knoll Rd. 42°44′01″N 88°17′23″W	Burlington	Greek Revival-styled house with its front veneered in cobblestone, built in 1858.
16	Historic Sixth Street Business District	Historic Sixth Street Business District	March 24, 1988 (#88000263)	Roughly bounded by Water St. and Fifth St., Main Seventh St., and Grand Ave. 42°43′36″N 87°47′07″W	Racine	Business district that grew along the main road coming into Racine from the west, with buildings ranging from the 1858 cream brick Italianate Ernst Hueffner Building to the 1933 Art Deco-styled First National Bank Trust Department building.
17	Horlick Malted Milk Company Industrial Complex	Horlick Malted Milk Company Industrial Complex	February 24, 2020 (#100004988)	2100-2234 Northwestern Ave., 1450-1500 Summit Ave. 42°44′18″N 87°48′29″W	Racine	Factory complex where William Horlick's company produced malted milk from sprouted barley, wheat flour, and evaporated milk. Included are the castle-like Gothic Revival-style factory blocks begun in 1882 and 1902, the 1910 engine room building, and the 1916 garage.
18	Herbert F. Johnson House	Herbert F. Johnson House	January 8, 1975 (#75000076)	33 E. Four Mile Rd. 42°46′49″N 87°46′16″W	Wind Point	Prairie School home known as Wingspread, with four wings radiating from a central hub, designed by Frank Lloyd Wright and built in 1938-39 for Herbert Fisk Johnson Jr. on the Wind Point peninsula.
19	Peter Johnson House	Peter Johnson House	January 6, 1986 (#86000053)	1601 State St. 42°43′54″N 87°48′00″W	Racine	Vernacular Queen Anne-styled house built in 1890, with sunburst motif in the gable ends, scroll-sawed decorations in the porch, and a distinctive tipped diamond stairway window. Also owned by bookkeeper William Havens and retired farmer Esek B. Sears.
20	S. C. Johnson and Son Administration Building and Research Tower	S. C. Johnson and Son Administration Building and Research Tower	December 27, 1974 (#74002275)	1525 Howe St. 42°42′49″N 87°47′27″W	Racine	Office buildings designed by Frank Lloyd Wright. The 1939 admin building has the iconic "lily pad" columns, and revived Wright's career. The 1947 research tower was the first tall building without visible support for the outer walls.
21	Karel Jonas House	Karel Jonas House	March 1, 1982 (#82000700)	1337 N. Erie St. 42°44′17″N 87°47′13″W	Racine	1878 home of Karel Jonas, Czech nationalist and exile, journalist, author, Racine civic leader, Wisconsin assemblyman, Lieutenant Governor, and U.S. ambassador.
22	Kaiser's	Kaiser's	November 25, 1980 (#80000176)	218 6th St. 42°43′37″N 87°47′01″W	Racine	2-story store with its facade redesigned by Frank J. Hoffman in Art Deco glazed terra cotta in 1928. Housed Maurice and Helen Kaiser's men's clothes store for 40 years.
23	Kane Street Historic District	Kane Street Historic District	July 25, 2014 (#14000452)	Generally bounded by Washington & Rudolph Sts., Perkins Blvd., Gardner Ave. 42°40′39″N 88°16′39″W	Burlington	Large historic neighborhood with 137 contributing buildings, including the 1846 Greek Revival Perkins house, the 1851 Federal-style Burhans house, the 1859 Georgian Revival Union School, the 1897 Queen Anne Jones house, the 1914 Tudor Revival Kinsley house, the 1920 American Foursquare McKercher house, the 1925 Dutch Colonial Revival Gehritz house, the 1925 Spanish Colonial Revival Harper house, and the 1927 Spetzman bungalow.
24	Kate Kelly (Shipwreck)	Kate Kelly (Shipwreck)	November 21, 2007 (#07001219)	L. Michigan, 2 mi. E of Wind Pt. 42°46′48″N 87°43′31″W	Wind Point	126-foot wooden-hulled 2-masted schooner built in 1867. Carried grain, coal and iron around the Great Lakes. Sank in a storm in 1895 carrying a load of hemlock railroad ties to Chicago.
25	Mitchell Lewis Building	Mitchell Lewis Building	April 20, 2005 (#05000334)	815 Eighth St. 42°43′26″N 87°47′25″W	Racine	3-story brick car factory/office building of the Mitchell Motor Company, designed by Guilbert and Funston and built in 1910. Later used for production of army tanks during WWII while owned by Massey-Harris.
26	Lincoln School	Lincoln School	August 19, 1994 (#94000999)	1800 State St. 42°44′06″N 87°48′14″W	Racine	Public school designed in Romanesque style by Guilbert and Chandler and built in 1890. Converted to loft apartments around 1990.
27	McClurg Building	McClurg Building	July 13, 1977 (#77000044)	245 Main St. 42°43′51″N 87°47′00″W	Racine	4-story office building built in 1858 in Italian Renaissance Revival style for the Racine and Mississippi Railroad. Later housed Racine's first public library, a vaudeville theater, Victorian Turkish baths, and the U.S.'s first vocational school, among other enterprises.
28	Melvin Avenue Residential Historic District	Melvin Avenue Residential Historic District	November 2, 2011 (#11000788)	Melvin Ave. generally bounded by Erie & N. Main Sts. 42°45′20″N 87°47′07″W	Racine	Neighborhood north of the downtown including the 1928 Seith bungalow, the 1928 Colonial Revival Voelker house, the 1929 Spanish Colonial Revival Griswold house, the 1930 Dutch Colonial Revival Dederich house, and the 1930 Tudor Revival Maier house.
29	Memorial Hall	Memorial Hall	April 10, 1980 (#80000177)	72 7th St. 42°43′33″N 87°46′51″W	Racine	Limestone auditorium above Lake Michigan, designed by Howard Van Doren Shaw in Neoclassical style, with a 2-story portico entrance. Built 1924-25 in memory of Racine's war dead.
30	George Murray House	George Murray House	June 6, 1979 (#79000104)	2219 Washington Ave. 42°42′49″N 87°48′22″W	Racine	Fine 2-story cream brick Italianate house designed by Walter Blythe and built in 1874. Murray was a Scottish immigrant who joined a lumber, lathe and shingle business in Racine.
31	No. 4 Engine House	No. 4 Engine House	June 27, 1979 (#79000102)	1339 Lincoln St. 42°44′16″N 87°47′20″W	Racine	Fire station with 4-story hose-drying and observation tower, designed by W.F. Goodhue in High Victorian Italianate style and built in 1888.
32	Northside Historic District of Cream Brick Workers' Cottages	Northside Historic District of Cream Brick Workers' Cottages	March 16, 1994 (#94000155)	Roughly bounded by Goold, Erie, English, Main, Yout and Chatham Sts. and Lakeview Community Center; 42°44′46″N 87°47′08″W	Racine	Neighborhood of modest homes, mostly 1.5 stories and front-gabled. Before 1900 they were mostly cream brick; after mostly frame. The 1884 Italianate-styled Falk house is a good example of an early brick cottage. Other structures include the 1894 Staaden butcher shop and the 1922 Kort bungalow.
33	Norwegian Buildings at Heg Park	Norwegian Buildings at Heg Park	July 17, 1980 (#80000178)	NE of Waterford on Heg Park Rd. 42°48′16″N 88°10′22″W	Wind Lake	The 1837 Bendickson log cabin and the Eielson frame house were moved from elsewhere. The 1869 Norway Evangelical Lutheran church was built on this site when this community was a focal point of Norwegian immigration to America.
34	Old Main Street Historic District	Old Main Street Historic District	August 11, 1987 (#87000491)	Roughly bounded by Second St., Lake Ave., Fifth St., and Wisconsin Ave. 42°43′46″N 87°47′00″W	Racine	Racine's old downtown, including the 1849 Italianate Durand and Hill Block, the 1857 Italian Renaissance Revival McClurg building, the 1880 Werner saloon and tailor shop, the 1891 Queen Anne-styled Mrvicka/Pabst saloon, the 1907 Engine House No 5, the 1915 Prairie Style YMCA, the 1919 Neoclassical Manufacturer's National Bank, the 1924 Chicago style Zahn's department store, and the 1929 White Tower Restaurant.
35	Orchard Street Historic District	Orchard Street Historic District	August 22, 2016 (#16000566)	Generally bounded by Haven & Lindermann Aves., Russet & Kentucky Sts. 42°43′26″N 87°49′43″W	Racine	West-side neighborhood that developed from 1929 to 1958, including the 1929 Matson bungalow, the 1930 Tudor Revival Tagatz house, the 1936 Colonial Revival Cooke house, the 1936 Mediterranean Revival Anderson house, the 1946 Georgian Revival Carnell house, and the 1949 Ranch-style Hess house.
36	Racine College	Racine College	December 12, 1976 (#76000076)	600 21st St. 42°42′22″N 87°47′10″W	Racine	Episcopal college founded in 1852, with Neo-Gothic buildings. Reorganized as a prep school and military school from 1889 to 1933. Now the DeKoven Center.
37	Racine County Courthouse	Racine County Courthouse	July 28, 1980 (#80000179)	730 Wisconsin Ave. 42°43′30″N 87°47′03″W	Racine	11-story courthouse designed by Holabird & Root in Modernist style with Art Deco details and built 1930 to 1931. Features relief sculptures by Carl Milles.
38	Racine Depot	Racine Depot	October 10, 1980 (#80000180)	1402 Liberty St. 42°43′50″N 87°47′52″W	Racine	Depot of the Chicago & NW Railway, designed by Frost & Granger and built in 1901 in Classical Revival style, built of red brick with stone trim.
39	Racine Elks Club, Lodge No. 252	Racine Elks Club, Lodge No. 252	September 7, 1984 (#84003778)	601 Lake Ave. 42°43′37″N 87°46′52″W	Racine	3-story Elks clubhouse, designed by A. Arthur Guilbert in Neoclassical style, and built in 1912.
40	Racine Harbor Lighthouse and Life Saving Station	Racine Harbor Lighthouse and Life Saving Station	September 9, 1975 (#75000077)	Racine Harbor North Pier; 42°44′03″N 87°46′43″W	Racine	Lightkeeper's quarters with integrated lighthouse tower built in 1866 to mark the entrance to Racine's harbor. In 1903 a separate life-saving station was added, from which a team from the Life-Saving Service launched search-and-rescue operations on Lake Michigan.
41	Racine Public Library	Racine Public Library	March 20, 1981 (#81000056)	701 S. Main St. 42°43′33″N 87°46′56″W	Racine	Former Carnegie Library, designed by John Mauran in Beaux-Arts style and built in 1904. Now houses Racine Heritage Museum.
42	Racine Rubber Company Homes Historic District	Racine Rubber Company Homes Historic District	September 27, 2006 (#06000904)	Roughly bounded by Victory Ave., Republic Ave., Cleveland Ave. and West Boulevard; 42°42′44″N 87°49′10″W	Racine	Planned neighborhood built in 1919-20 by the Ajax Rubber Company for its workers. Consists of 100 duplex homes in 10 standard models. All originally had clapboard siding, wood shingles, and open porches. 3117-3119 17th St is an example of type 1. The neighborhood is also known as "Rubberville."
43	Rickeman Grocery Building	Rickeman Grocery Building	March 1, 1982 (#82000701)	415 6th St. 42°43′35″N 87°47′08″W	Racine	Italianate-styled store with a pressed sheet metal cornice, built in 1894 to house Rickeman's grocery and saloon.
44	Root River Parks (Island, Riverside, Cedar Bend, and Washington Parks)		June 18, 2025 (#100011952)	42°43′13″N 87°48′24″W	Racine	Beginning of Racine's city park system, started around 1905, initially funded privately and designed by Jens Jensen in landscape Prairie Style - i.e. native vegetation and gently curving paths around a water feature.
45	Shoop Building	Shoop Building	April 26, 1978 (#78000129)	215 State St. 42°43′53″N 87°47′04″W	Racine	6-story Richardsonian Romanesque-styled office building designed by James Gilbert Chandler and built from 1893 to 1902, from which Dr. Clarendon Shoop sold his patent medicines. Later housed Western Publishing.
46	Southern Wisconsin Home Historic District	Southern Wisconsin Home Historic District	September 27, 1991 (#91001394)	21425 Spring St. 42°41′36″N 88°04′52″W	Dover	Complex of "cottages" and service buildings built from 1918 to 1938 to house and educate people with intellectual disabilities in a somewhat home-like environment.
47	Southside Historic District	Southside Historic District	October 18, 1977 (#77000147)	Roughly bounded by Lake Michigan, DeKoven Ave., Villa and Eighth Sts. 42°42′51″N 87°46′57″W	Racine	Prestigious neighborhood with over 500 contributing structures representing many architectural styles, some built as early as the 1840s.
48	St. Luke's Episcopal Church, Chapel, Guildhall, and Rectory	St. Luke's Episcopal Church, Chapel, Guildhall, and Rectory	July 27, 1979 (#79000105)	614 S. Main St. 42°43′35″N 87°46′59″W	Racine	Episcopal parish complex, including the 1866 Gothic Revival-styled church designed by E. Townsend Mix.
49	St. Patrick's Roman Catholic Church	St. Patrick's Roman Catholic Church	July 5, 1979 (#79000106)	1100 Erie St. 42°44′04″N 87°47′15″W	Racine	Church that is surprisingly modern-looking for being built in 1925. In his design, Barry Byrne mixed Neogothic style with Art Deco and perhaps a bit of Prairie School.
50	Thomas H. Smith Shipwreck (Steambarge)		June 15, 2026 (#100013123)	Address Restricted	Caledonia vicinity	130-foot wood-hulled steambarge built in 1881 by Rand & Burger in Manitowoc. The Smith hauled lumber and lumber products between Sturgeon Bay and Chicago. On November 11, 1893 in a fog while towing a schooner, the Smith collided with the steel steamer Arthur Orr and sank. The crew was rescued by the Orr.
51	United Laymen Bible Student Tabernacle	United Laymen Bible Student Tabernacle	December 8, 1983 (#83004318)	924 Center St. 42°43′19″N 87°47′23″W	Racine	Brick auditorium designed with Art Deco front by J. Mandor Matson and built in 1927 for a cross-church Bible study group.
52	Uptown Theater	Uptown Theater	March 1, 1982 (#82000702)	1426-1430 Washington Ave. 42°42′57″N 87°47′54″W	Racine	1200-seat theater with ornate Gothic Revival interior designed by Wade B. Denham - the last historic theater interior in Racine.
53	US Post Office-Racine Main	US Post Office-Racine Main	May 8, 1985 (#85000989)	603 Main St. 42°43′37″N 87°46′56″W	Racine	large Neoclassical-styled post office built in 1930, with the front entrance ornamented with six large Corinthian columns.
54	Walker Manufacturing Company-Ajax Plant	Walker Manufacturing Company-Ajax Plant	August 9, 2016 (#16000519)	1520 Clark St. 42°42′48″N 87°47′42″W	Racine	Brick factory complex begun in 1894 which manufactured automobile mufflers, and where the innovative Walker Silencer was invented. Demolished in 2020.
55	Whitman-Belden House	Whitman-Belden House	January 17, 1980 (#80000181)	108 N. State St. 42°44′31″N 88°13′37″W	Rochester	Intact Greek Revival-styled house built in 1847 by Abial Whitman, a clothes merchant from Vermont. The lot was initially owned by Philo Belden, early settler, land speculator, businessman, legislator, and judge. His grandson Ellsworth, also a judge, grew up in the house and inherited it at the age of 10.
56	Wilmanor Apartments	Wilmanor Apartments	June 24, 1994 (#94000649)	1419-1429 W. Sixth St. and 253-255 N. Memorial Dr. 42°43′32″N 87°47′55″W	Racine	3-story Georgian Revival-styled apartment building designed by J. Mandor Matson and built by Wm. M. Christensen Construction in 1929, when it was only the second large-scale apartment building in Racine.
57	Windpoint Light Station	Windpoint Light Station	July 19, 1984 (#84003780)	Windridge Dr. at Lake Michigan; 42°46′51″N 87°45′30″W	Racine	108-foot lighthouse designed by Orlando Metcalfe Poe and built in 1880 on the point 3.5 miles north of Racine.
58	Yorkville #4 School	Yorkville #4 School	August 4, 2011 (#11000518)	17640 Old Yorkville Rd. 42°44′31″N 88°01′37″W	Yorkville	1-room school built in 1885, with cream brick walls, Italianate-styled brackets under the eaves, and a matching cupola.
59	Young Men's Christian Association Building	Young Men's Christian Association Building	March 1, 1982 (#82000703)	314-320 6th St. 42°43′36″N 87°47′05″W	Racine	Queen Anne-styled YMCA building, designed by James Gilbert Chandler and built in 1886.

== See also ==
- List of National Historic Landmarks in Wisconsin
- National Register of Historic Places listings in Wisconsin
- Listings in neighboring counties: Kenosha, Milwaukee, Walworth, Waukesha
