= Mitchell Lewis =

Mitchell or Mitch Lewis may also refer to:

- Mitchell Lewis (actor) (1880–1956), American film actor
- Mitch Lewis (born 1954), Canadian multi-instrumentalist
- Mitchell Lewis (footballer) (born 1998), Australian footballer

== See also ==
- Mitchell (automobile), manufactured by Mitchell-Lewis Motor Company
  - Mitchell Lewis Building, a historic building in Racine, Wisconsin
- Lewis Mitchell (1847–1930), Native American member of the Maine state legislature
