= Kaiser's =

Kaiser's may refer to:

- Kaiser's (Evansville, Indiana), listed on the National Register of Historic Places in Vanderburgh County, Indiana
- Kaiser's (Racine, Wisconsin), listed on the National Register of Historic Places in Racine County, Wisconsin
- Kaiser's (supermarket), a German supermarket chain
