= Racine Heritage Museum =

Museum in Racine, Wisconsin

- U.S. National Register of Historic Places
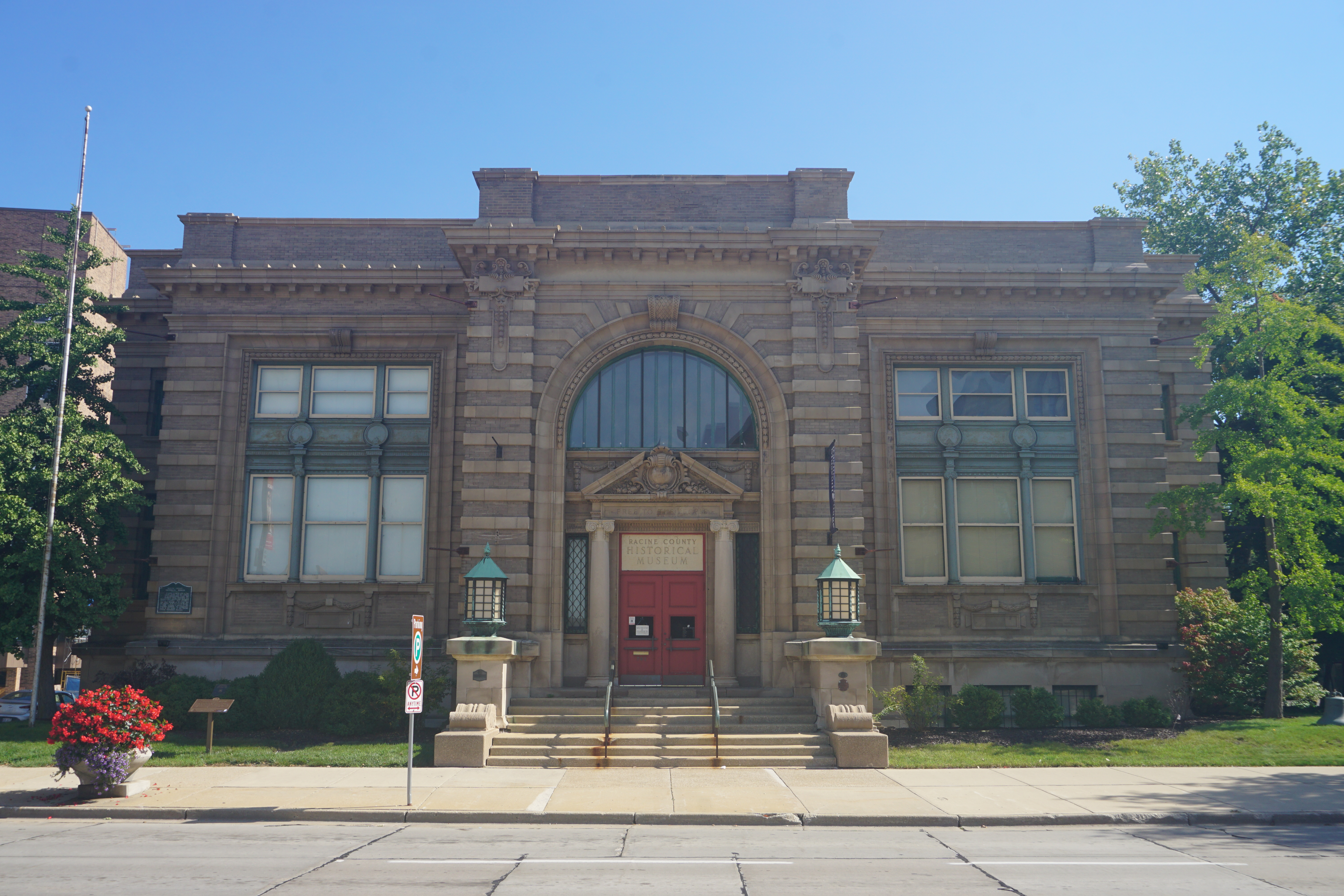

- Location within Wisconsin Location within the United States
- Location: 701 S. Main St., Racine, Wisconsin
- Coordinates: 42°43′33″N 87°46′56″W
- Area: 0.1 acres (0.040 ha)
- Built: 1904
- Architect: John Mauran
- Architectural style: Beaux-Arts architecture
- NRHP reference No.: 81000056
- Added to NRHP: March 20, 1981

The Racine Heritage Museum is a historical museum building and former Carnegie library, located at 701 S. Main St. in downtown Racine, Wisconsin. Designed by John Mauran in the Beaux-Arts style, the building served as the Racine Public Library from 1904 until 1958, and has housed the Racine Heritage Museum since 1963. It is also the home of the Racine County Historical Society. It was added to the National Register of Historic Places on March 20, 1981.

== Description ==
John Mauran designed the building, in an architectural style that has been described varyingly as Beaux-Arts and as Renaissance Revival. The two-story building is constructed of Bedford limestone and brick, with accents in "St. Louis granite pressed brick" and buff-colored terracotta. This terracotta is used to create many embellished decorations on each of the building's facades.

The front of the building faces west toward Main Street, dominated by a Roman arch with an Ionic portico, topped by a broken pediment. The transom plaque, not original to the building, reads "Racine County Historical Society". The frieze features the words "Free to the People". On the north facade, facing Seventh Street, a panel reads "Intelligence is the Foundation of Prosperity and Social Order". An accompanying panel on the south side read "Ye Shall Know the Truth and the Truth Shall Make You Free." The original east facade was destroyed by an expansion of the building in 1989, and a 1981 survey records nothing significant about it.

== History ==
The idea of a public library for Racine was first proposed at a meeting of businessmen and ladies at the home of A. Arthur Guilbert in 1895. A library association was founded the following year, which lobbied for a successful ballot referendum that provided city funding to the project. Some city philanthropists, including William Horlick, offered additional funding. The city's first public library, located in a room in the Secor Block, thus opened in September 1897. Almost immediately afterward, the library association began raising funds for a permanent library building in West Park, but their efforts were hampered when the City Council blocked that site from being developed. Meanwhile, the library's board sought the aid of Andrew Carnegie, who had recently funded the construction of hundreds of libraries in the United States, and he ultimately offered a donation of $50,000 in 1901. However, it was stipulated that the library offer $5,000 of its proceeds to the Carnegie Foundation each year of its operation.

After contentious debate, the library board chose the southeast corner of Main and Seventh streets as the site for its new building. The site was purchased from Mary E. Hall in 1902. The farmhouse that formerly stood there was sold and moved. A number of plans for the building were submitted, and the one chosen was a design by John Mauran, a two-story stone and brick building in the Beaux-Arts style. The plans were presented at the convention of the Western Library Association in August 1902, where it was declared "The Library Beautiful". The building's cornerstone was laid on May 30, 1903, in a ceremony featuring judge Charles E. Dyer. Construction was contracted to A.H. Harcus and Co., and it opened to the public unceremoniously on March 16, 1904.

At the time of the library's opening, it held 97,000 books in its collection. Its ground floor featured two reading rooms, with a small auditorium and museum upstairs, and newspaper archives in the basement. Even this building, however, was insufficient before long, and the library was augmented with the opening of a branch in 1914, which had a higher circulation than the main building in the following year. Some of the library's collection was also housed in the libraries of the city's public schools. By 1929, the building had been called "outgrown", and proposals for a replacement in 1934 were inspired by the New Deal's public works programs. Architects Kirchhoff & Rose submitted a plan that year for a large five-story building on that site, which the PWA approved but which was never built.

Efforts to replace the Racine Public Library were renewed in 1954, with the city council approving the proposal to build in Memorial Park, although cost concerns reduced the size of the planned building. After the new library building opened on May 18, 1958, the old building was left vacant. Over 75,000 books were moved from the old library to the new in a single day. Various uses were proposed for it, including making it part of the University of Wisconsin–Racine campus or administrative offices for the Racine Unified School District. The Racine County Historical Society, then outgrowing its existing space in the county courthouse, held a campaign in 1960 to gain funding to buy the building.

The Racine County Museum opened May 18, 1962. The museum remained a separate entity from the Historical Society, with which it shared the building, until they merged in 1982. A large addition on the east side of the building was constructed in 1989. A proposal for an entirely new museum, known as "Discovery Place", received state and local funding in 2001, but was never built. The museum has housed the Racine County Sports Hall of Fame since its creation in 2011. In addition to the former Carnegie library building, the historical society also owns the 1888 Bohemian Schoolhouse in Caledonia.

== Museum ==
As the primary historical museum of Racine County, the Heritage Museum is home to a large archival collection, which is kept in the basement, and features several permanent exhibits in the upper floors. These exhibits include:

- "Racine County: Factory for the World", highlighting a variety of well-known commercial products that were manufactured in Racine.
- "This Train is Bound For Glory: Racine County's Underground Railroad", focusing on abolitionist activism in Racine prior to the Civil War.
- "Waterways", featuring artifacts from Racine's history as a Lake Michigan port and harbor, the centerpiece of which is a Fresnel lens from the Wind Point Lighthouse.
- "An Amazing Journey: the Life and Legacy of Laurel Clark", showing artifacts recovered from the Space Shuttle Columbia disaster.
- "Frank Lloyd Wright in Racine"
- "Racine Belles Baseball"
- "Immigration and Settlement"

Other unique artifacts in the museum's collection include an Egyptian mummy formerly owned by William Horlick, Case an 1883 reverse-flue steam tractor, and a fully restored 1927 Case Model Y touring car.

The museum is also home to the Racine County Sports Hall of Fame.

== See also ==
- National Register of Historic Places listings in Racine County, Wisconsin
