= Racine Elks Club, Lodge No. 252 =

- U.S. National Register of Historic Places
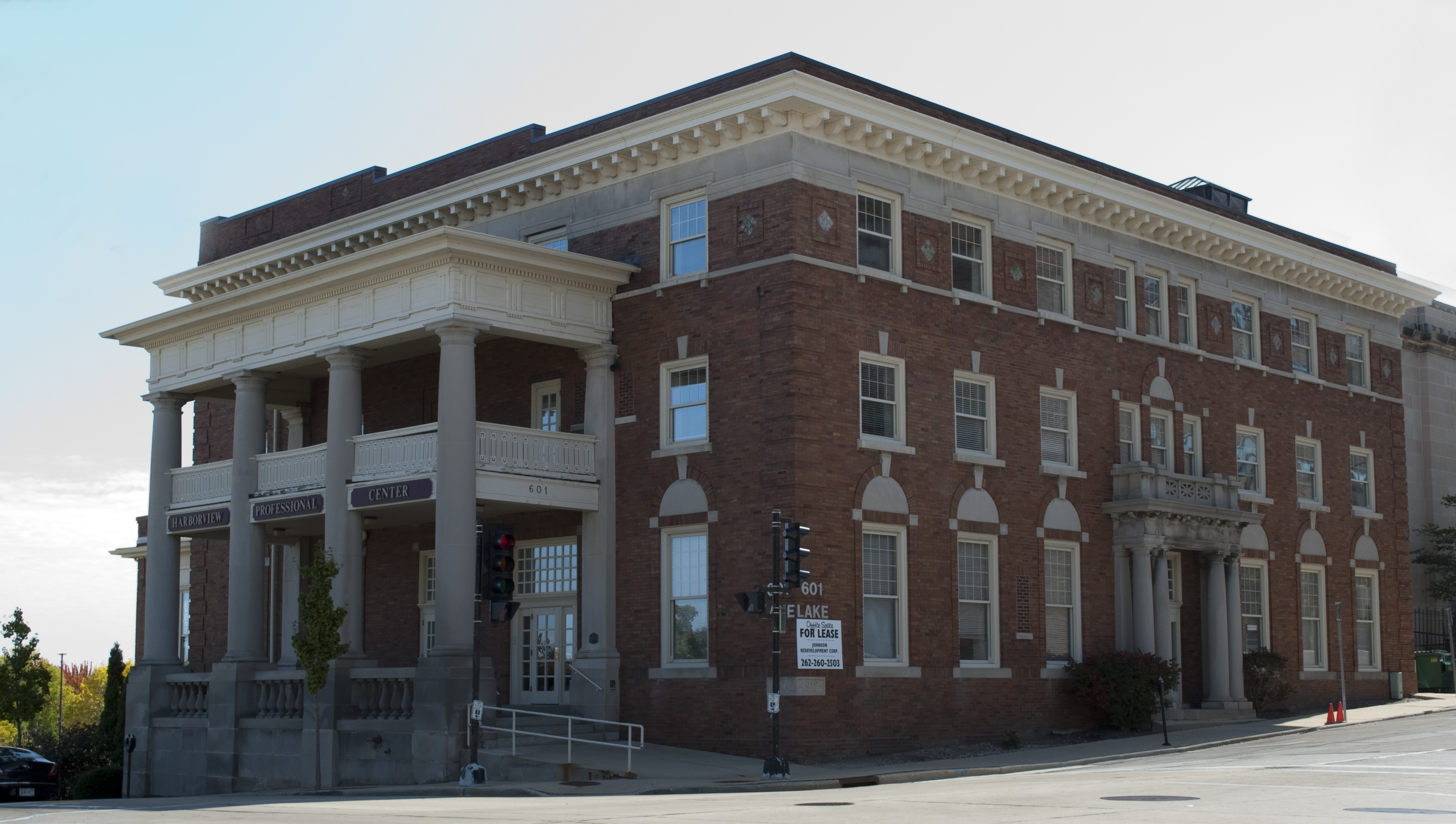

- Location within Wisconsin Location within the United States
- Location: 601 Lake Ave., Racine, Wisconsin
- Coordinates: 42°43′37″N 87°46′52″W
- Area: less than one acre
- Built: 1912
- Architect: Guilbert & Funston
- Architectural style: Classical Revival
- NRHP reference No.: 84003778
- Added to NRHP: September 7, 1984

The Racine Elks Club, Lodge No. 252 is an historic building located in Racine, Wisconsin, United States. It was built in 1912 and listed on the National Register of Historic Places in 1984. It was probably designed primarily by A. Arthur Guilbert.

The 3-story building is a Neoclassical design, with red brick walls trimmed in limestone and brick quoins on the corners. The entrances are framed in Tuscan columns and pilasters. The first and second floor windows are accented with keystones. Above the third floor windows is a wide wooden cornice, and above that a brick parapet.

The lodge closed in January 2011 and the building has since been repurposed for office space. In 2014, the top floor of the building was fully renovated to accommodate the new headquarters for the intellectual property law firm Jansson Munger McKinley & Kirby, Ltd.
