= Lincoln School (Racine, Wisconsin) =

- U.S. National Register of Historic Places
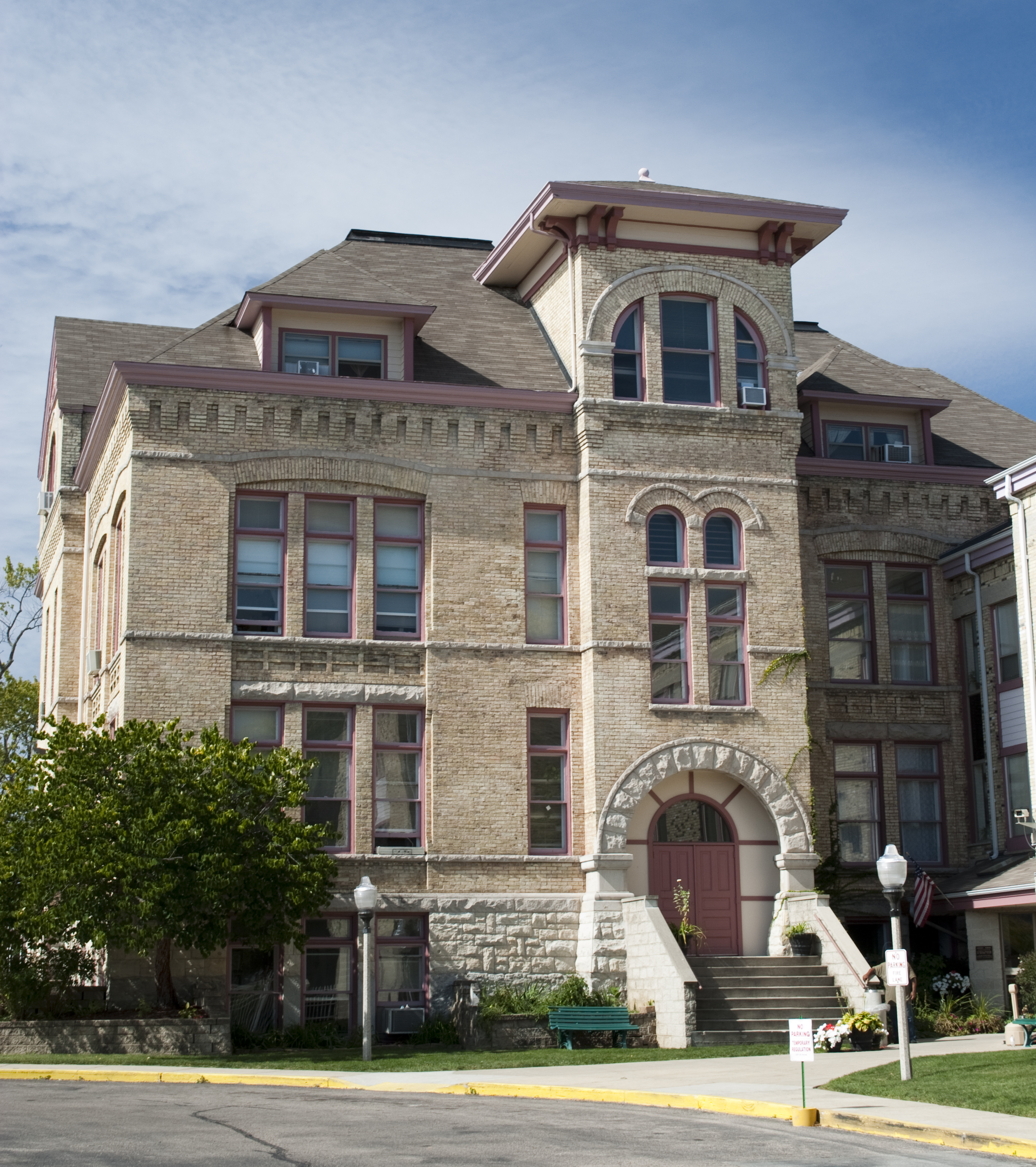

- Location within Wisconsin
- Location: 1800 State Street, Racine, Wisconsin
- Coordinates: 42°44′06.0″N 87°48′14.0″W
- Architect: A. Arthur Guilbert and James Gilbert Chandler
- Architectural style: Romanesque architecture
- NRHP reference No.: 94000999
- Added to NRHP: 19 August 1994

Lincoln School Historic Apartments, formerly Lincoln School, is a former public school and current loft apartment building in Racine, Wisconsin. Constructed in 1890, it replaced an earlier school on the other side of State Street, which had been built in 1862 and damaged by a tornado in 1883. The school opened in April 1891, with eight classrooms. An addition was made in 1908, adding eight more rooms, as well as an auditorium, stockroom, nurse's room, and teacher's lounge. A statue of the school's namesake, Abraham Lincoln, was erected on a triangular plot next to the school in 1923. A chimney was added in 1932, with a boiler house built in 1936. The school closed in 1981, and was used for storage by the school district until it was sold to the Toldt-Hennessy Group of Brookfield in 1988. On September 1, 1991, the first tenants moved into the newly converted Lincoln School Historic Apartments, a loft building geared toward seniors.
