= Burlington Community Swimming Pools and Bathhouse =

- U.S. National Register of Historic Places
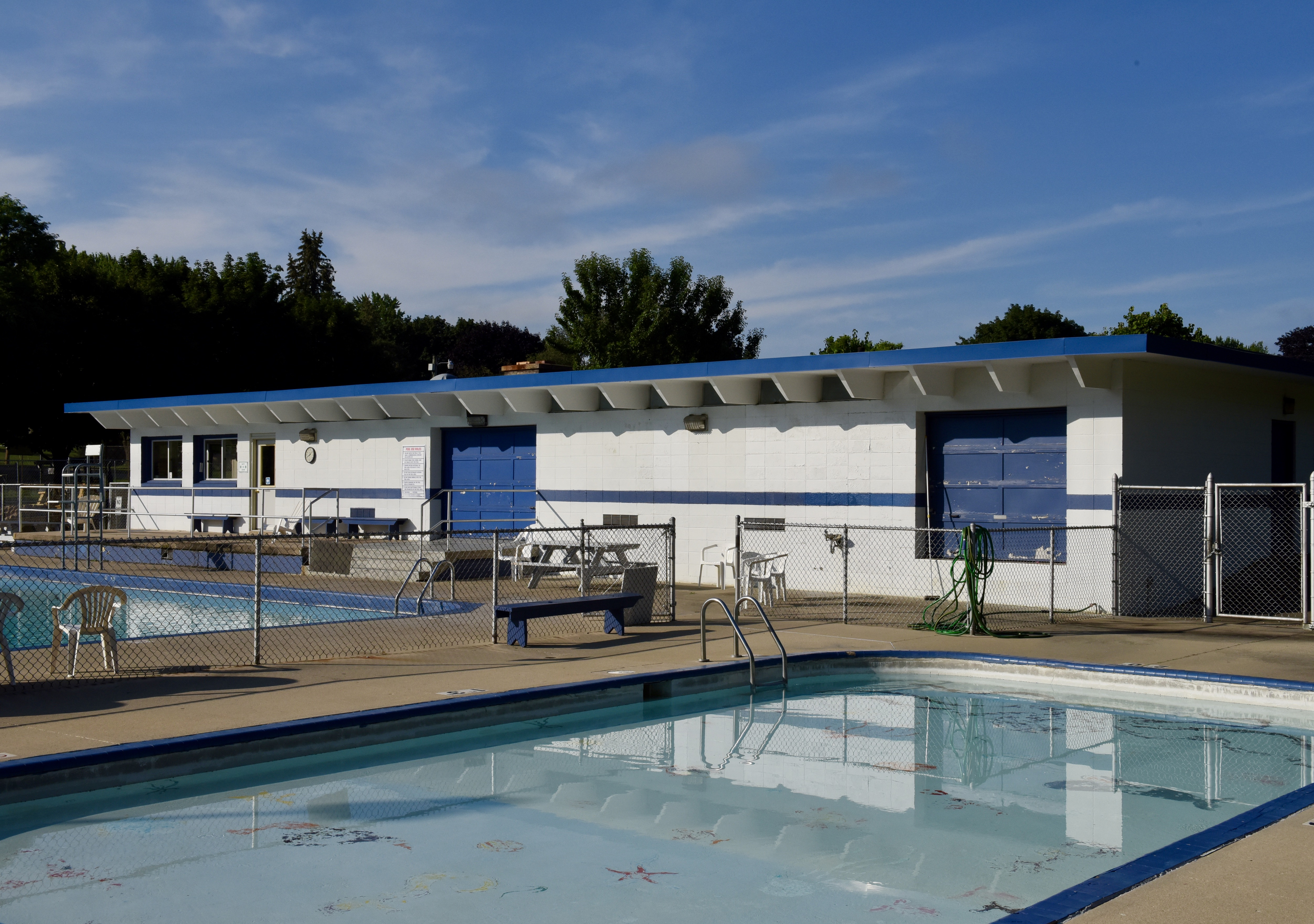

- Location within Wisconsin Location within the United States
- Location: 394 Amanda St. Burlington, Wisconsin
- Coordinates: 42°40′56″N 88°15′35″W
- Built: 1965
- Built by: Zinzow Construction Company
- Architect: Carl Iverson
- Architectural style: Modern movement
- NRHP reference No.: 13000850
- Added to NRHP: October 23, 2013

Burlington Community Swimming Pools and Bathhouse in Burlington, Wisconsin, is a historic property that was listed on the National Register of Historic Places on October 23, 2013.

The property, located at 394 Amanda Street, consists of a swimming pool and bathhouse that were privately built in 1965. It was listed on the National Register as an "excellent example of contemporary style architecture," including the use of prestressed and precast concrete structural members manufactured in the local area. It was designed by Carl Iverson.

== See also ==
- National Register of Historic Places listings in Racine County, Wisconsin
