= Mitchell Lewis Building =

- U.S. National Register of Historic Places
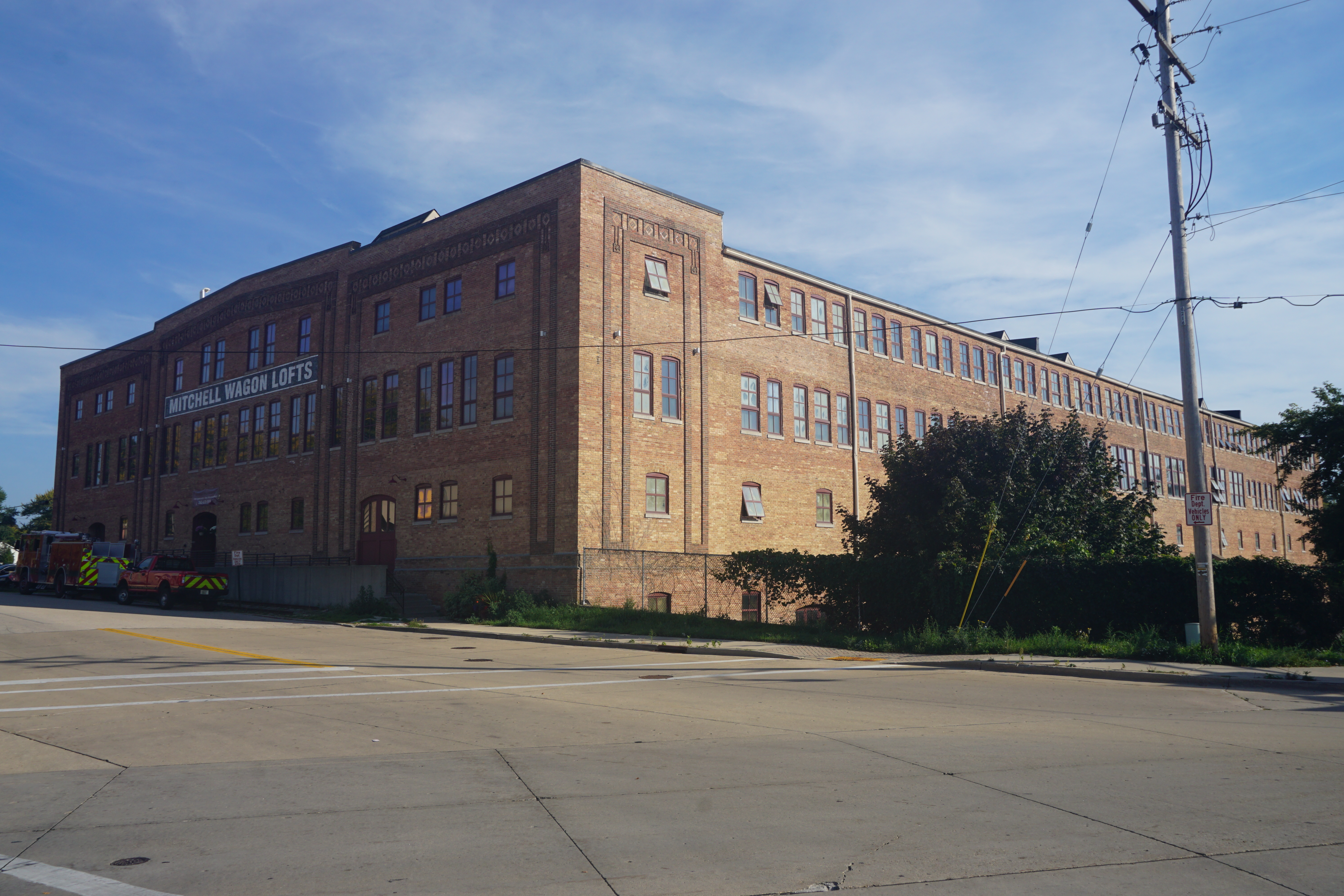

- Location within Wisconsin
- Location: 815 Eighth Street, Racine, Wisconsin
- Coordinates: 42°43′26.0″N 87°47′25.6″W
- Architect: Guilbert and Funston
- Architectural style: Late 19th and early 20th century American movements
- NRHP reference No.: 05000334
- Added to NRHP: 20 April 2005

The Mitchell Lewis Building is a historic building in Racine, Wisconsin, and a former office building and automobile factory for the Mitchell Motor Company. Designed by the local architectural firm of Guilbert and Funston, it was built in 1910 at 815 Eighth Street, alongside the Chicago and North Western railroad track. After the Mitchell company went out of business in 1923, the factory was used by Nash Motors until 1929, when it was sold to the J.I. Case company, which used it as a warehouse. Later owned by Massey-Harris, it was used to build tanks during World War II. In 1960, the building was acquired by Jacobsen Manufacturing, a subsidiary of Textron, which closed the factory on June 29, 2001. Madison-based firm Gorman and Company, also responsible for the Belle Harbor lofts conversion in Racine, purchased the vacant building and converted it into apartment lofts, which opened October 13, 2004. The building was added to the National Register of Historic Places the following year.
