= Franklyn Hazelo House =

Historic house in Wisconsin, United States

- U.S. National Register of Historic Places
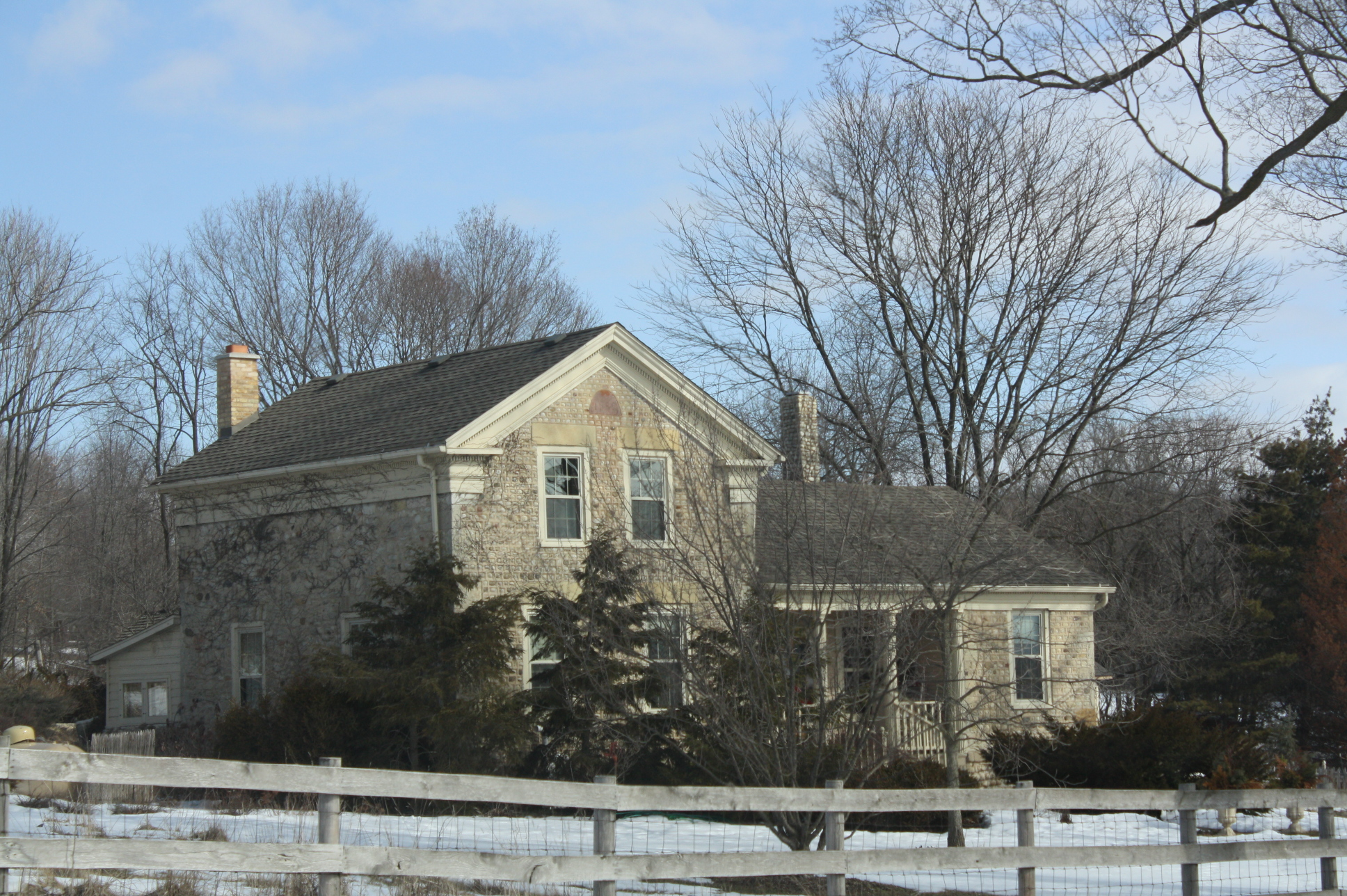

- Location within Wisconsin Location within the United States
- Location: 34108 Oak Knoll Rd. Burlington, Wisconsin
- Coordinates: 42°44′1″N 88°17′23″W
- Area: less than one acre
- Built: 1858
- Architectural style: Greek Revival
- NRHP reference No.: 74000121
- Added to NRHP: December 30, 1974

The Franklyn Hazelo House is a Greek Revival-styled house clad in cobblestones that was built in 1858 in Rochester, Wisconsin, United States. It was added to the National Register of Historic Places in 1974.

Jedediah Healy and his family were early settlers in Racine County, arriving in 1841. By 1858 he was well-enough established to build a fine house, reminiscent of homes back east. The style is Greek Revival, with a complex cornice, cornice returns, symmetric windows in the front of the main block, and Doric columns in the entry porch. The side walls and back consisted of coursed dolomite, but the front surface is the notable one.

The front is veneered in small cobblestones - i.e. hard little rocks rounded by millennia of wave action or by the grinding of glaciers. The cobbles are laid in rows, with each set in a frame of raised mortar. Their colors vary somewhat, but are all earth tones. The corners of the walls are framed in quoins of rough-cut stone. A delicate cobblestone chimney rises from the side wing. The use of cobblestone to veneer houses came from western New York, where such stones were plentiful. In Wisconsin, cobblestone treatment is rather rare, and even more rare is its choice by non-New Yorkers.
