= No. 4 Engine House =

- U.S. National Register of Historic Places
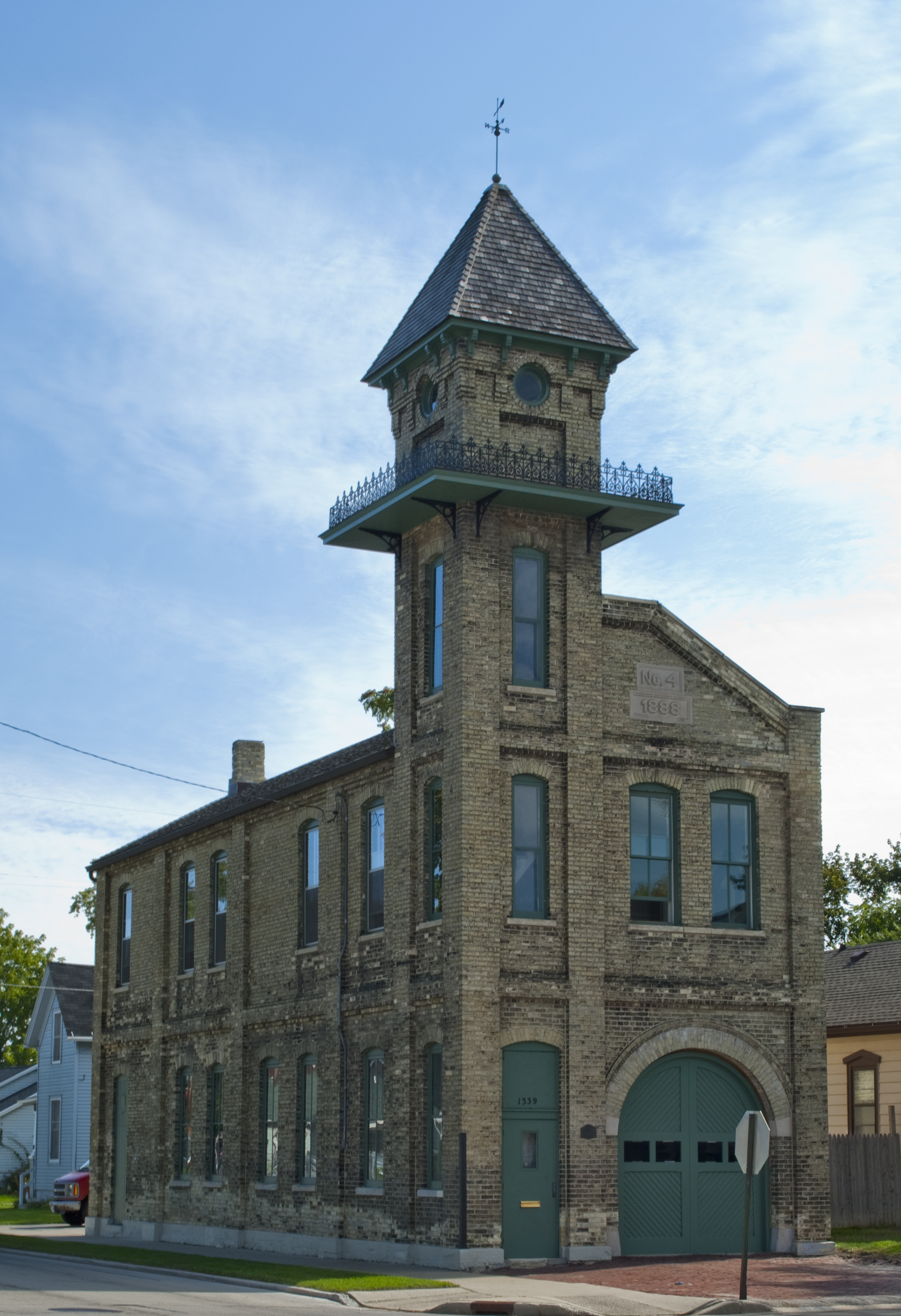

- Location within Wisconsin
- Location: 1339 Lincoln Street
- Coordinates: 42°44′16″N 87°47′20″W
- Built: 1888
- Architect: W.F. Goodhue
- Architectural style: High Victorian Italianate
- NRHP reference No.: 79000102
- Added to NRHP: June 27, 1979

No. 4 Engine House is a historic fire station building in Racine, Wisconsin, built in 1888 in a High Victorian Italianate style. It is located in the north-central part of the city, at the corner of Lincoln Street and Barker Street. The cream brick building, designed by W.F. Goodhue, is primarily two stories tall but features a four-story hose-drying and observation tower.

== History ==
A major fire in Racine in 1882 inspired the city to abolish its volunteer fire brigades and created several companies of professional firefighters. City Engineer W.F. Goodhue submitted plans in January 1888 for a new building for Engine Company No. 4, and construction was carried out that summer by Hannibal Lugg and Peter Beffel. The building was used by the Racine fire department until 1926, when it was replaced with a bungalow-style building at the corner of Marquette Street and Kewaunee Street. The building was purchased by the Hurley-Stuebe Printing Company, which donated the firehouse bell to the Saint Francis Monastery in Burlington, Wisconsin in 1933. Hurley-Stuebe continued to use the building as its printing office until 1950, and it later became the home of the Greene Glass company. By 1979, when the building was listed on the National Register of Historic Places, the building's original exterior was essentially unchanged, although the interior had been modified enough to not be included in the listing.
