= Thomas Driver and Sons Manufacturing Company =

- U.S. National Register of Historic Places
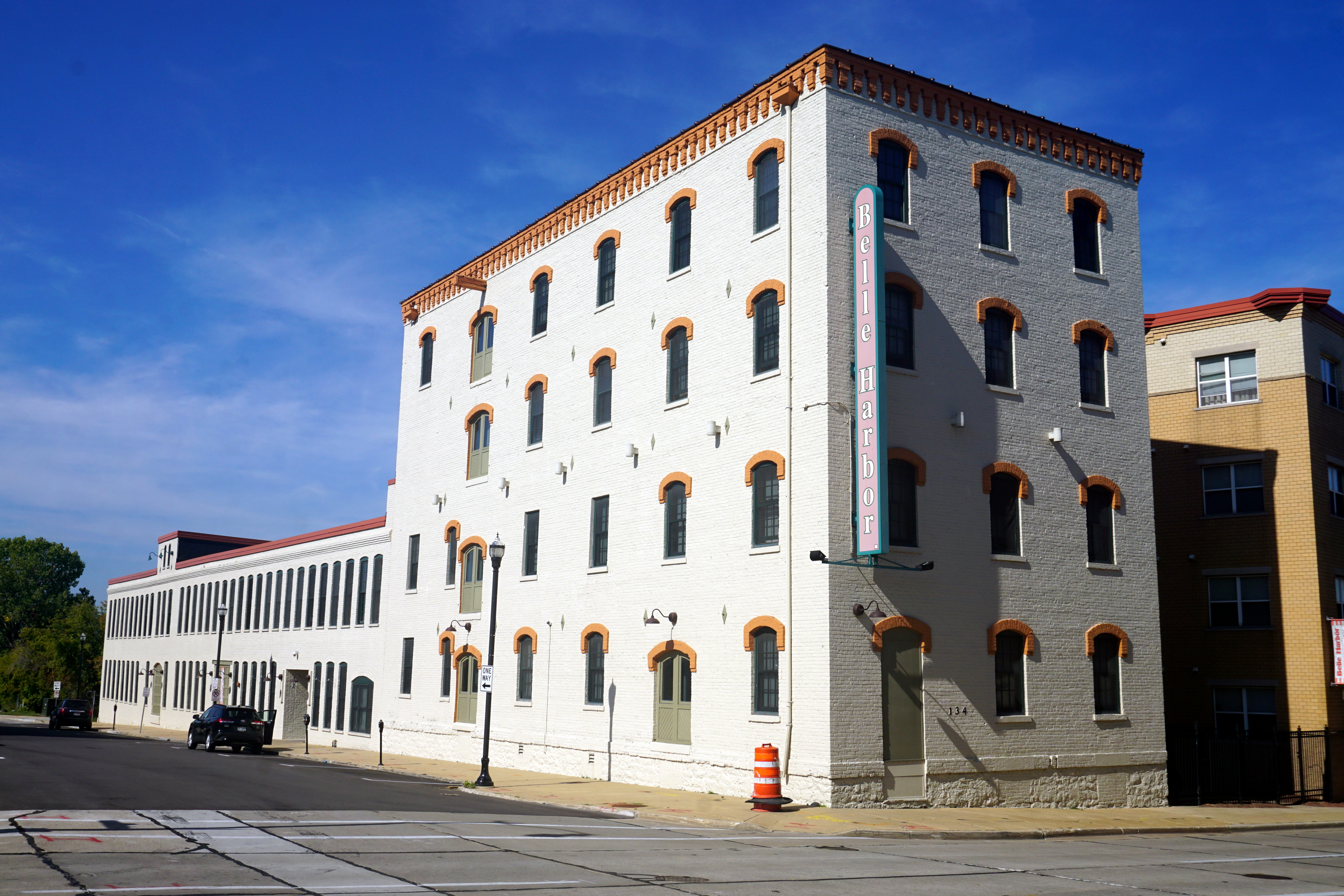
- The Main Street building in 2023

- Location within Wisconsin
- Location: 134 S. Main St., 214 State St., Racine, Wisconsin
- Coordinates: 42°43′55″N 87°47′3″W
- Area: 1.2 acres (0.49 ha)
- Architectural style: Late 19th And Early 20th Century American Movements
- NRHP reference No.: 04000713
- Added to NRHP: July 14, 2004

The Thomas Driver and Sons Manufacturing Company is a complex of two historic factory buildings in downtown Racine, Wisconsin. The Thomas Driver and Sons manufacturing company itself was a manufacturer of sash windows and doors that was first established in 1867. The buildings, located at 134 South Main Street and 214 State Street, are on opposite sides of Second Street. The site was added to the National Register of Historic Places on July 14, 2004.

== History ==
Thomas Driver immigrated to Racine from Orkney in 1854. Driver first established his manufacturing business in Racine in 1867. He purchased the factory owned by the architect Lucas Bradley, at which he had previously worked. This factory had existed at Sixth and Campbell (now Grand Avenue) Streets since the 1840s, but burned down on January 17, 1870. The first building on the present site was built at State Street shortly after the fire.

The currently surviving warehouse north of Second Street was built in 1882. The original 1870 building was struck by fire in 1896, and it was rebuilt in its present form within the year. Thomas Driver died in 1899, and the operations of his company were taken over by his son, Sinclair, who ran the business until it closed in 1917.

After the Driver company closed, the buildings were sold to Western Publishing. The Main Street building was occupied by an auto supply store for much of the 20th century until its closure in the 1980s. The idea of converting the vacant building to hold dozens of apartments was first proposed in 1990, and Belle Harbor Lofts opened in the building in 2002. Today, the State Street building houses a print shop that opened in 1989, and a liquor store that opened in 2014.

== See also ==
- Republic Windows and Doors
- National Register of Historic Places listings in Racine County, Wisconsin
