= Kane Street Historic District =

- U.S. National Register of Historic Places
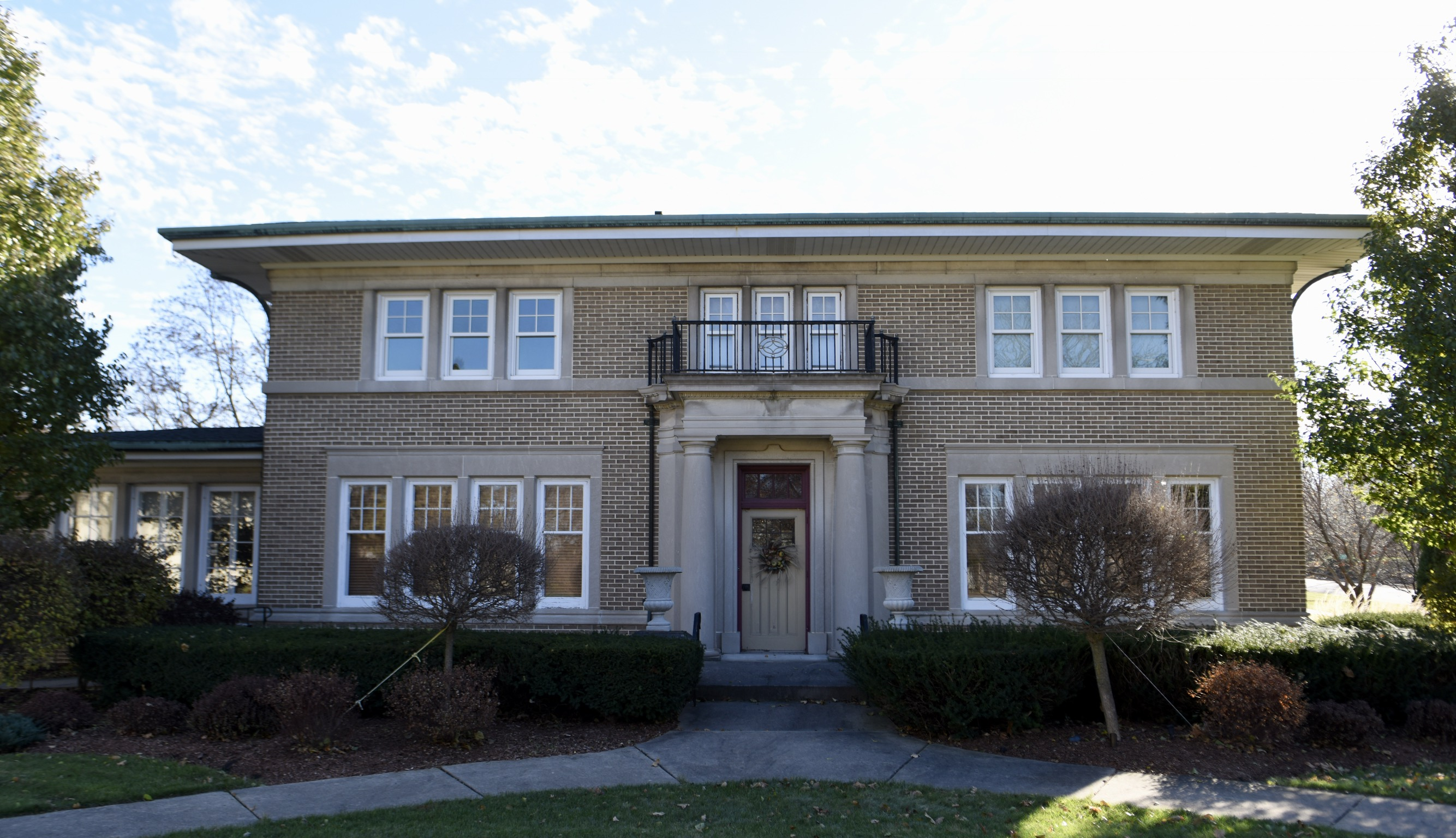
- House at 101 E. State St.

- Location within Wisconsin
- Location: Generally bounded by Washington & Rudolph Sts., Perkins Blvd., Gardner Ave., Burlington, Wisconsin
- Coordinates: 42°40′39″N 88°16′39″W
- NRHP reference No.: 14000452
- Added to NRHP: July 25, 2014

The Kane Street Historic District is a residential historic district in central Burlington, Wisconsin. The district includes 158 buildings, 137 of which are considered contributing buildings to its historic character, and a statue of Abraham Lincoln. Development in the district began in the 1840s shortly after Burlington was settled and continued through the mid-twentieth century, though construction peaked in the decades after the Wisconsin Central Railroad opened a station in Burlington in 1884. Many of the homes in the district belonged to Burlington's most influential residents, including merchant Ephraim Perkins, the Meinhardt banking family, and Louis H. Rohr, owner of the Wisconsin Condensed Milk Company. The district includes examples of most of the popular American architectural styles of the nineteenth and early twentieth centuries. Its earliest homes have Greek Revival, Italianate, and gabled ell vernacular designs. The Queen Anne style was popular during the district's building boom, and 54 of its houses utilize the style. Early twentieth century styles are also well-represented in the district, including American Foursquare, bungalow, Colonial Revival, Dutch Colonial, and Tudor Revival.

The district was added to the National Register of Historic Places on July 25, 2014. The 1882 Meinhardt House, a large Queen Anne home in the district, burned down in November 2024.
