= McClurg Building (Racine, Wisconsin) =

- U.S. National Register of Historic Places
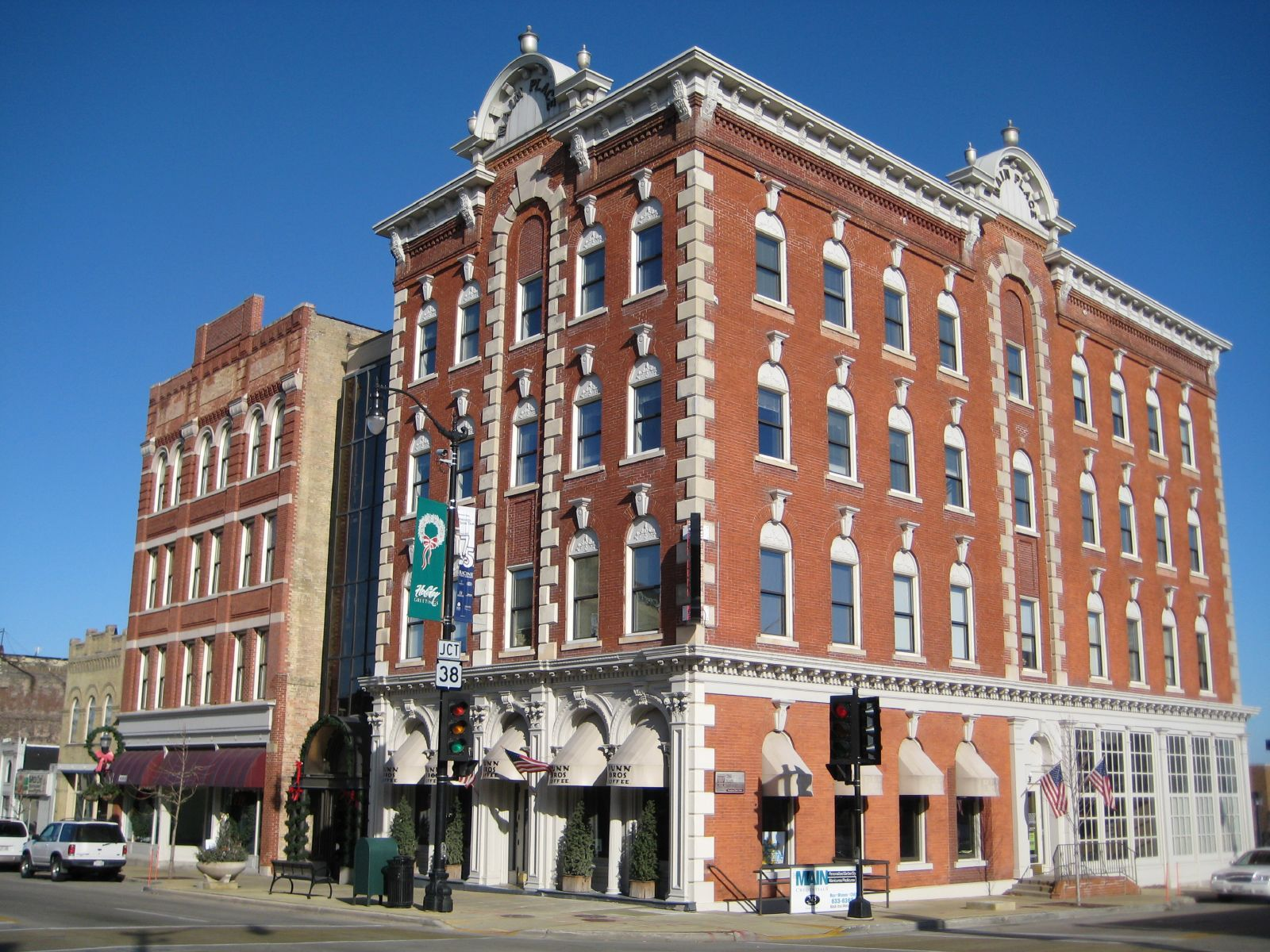

- Location within Wisconsin Location within the United States
- Location: 245 Main St., Racine, Wisconsin
- Coordinates: 42°43′51″N 87°47′0″W
- Area: 0.2 acres (0.081 ha)
- Built: 1858
- Architect: Alexander McClurg
- Architectural style: Renaissance, Italianate
- NRHP reference No.: 77000044
- Added to NRHP: July 13, 1977

The McClurg Building is a historic building located at 245 Main St. in Racine, Wisconsin. The building was built in 1858 and designed by Alexander McClurg in the Renaissance architecture and Italianate architecture styles.

The building originally held offices for the Racine and Mississippi Railroad and has served a variety of other uses since its construction. Many of the businesses and institutions which occupied the building were the first of their kind in Racine, including the city's first public library, municipal court, vaudeville theater, movie theater, and Victorian Turkish baths, as well as the United States' first vocational school. The building was added to the National Register of Historic Places on July 13, 1977.
