= Kaiser's (Racine, Wisconsin) =

- U.S. National Register of Historic Places
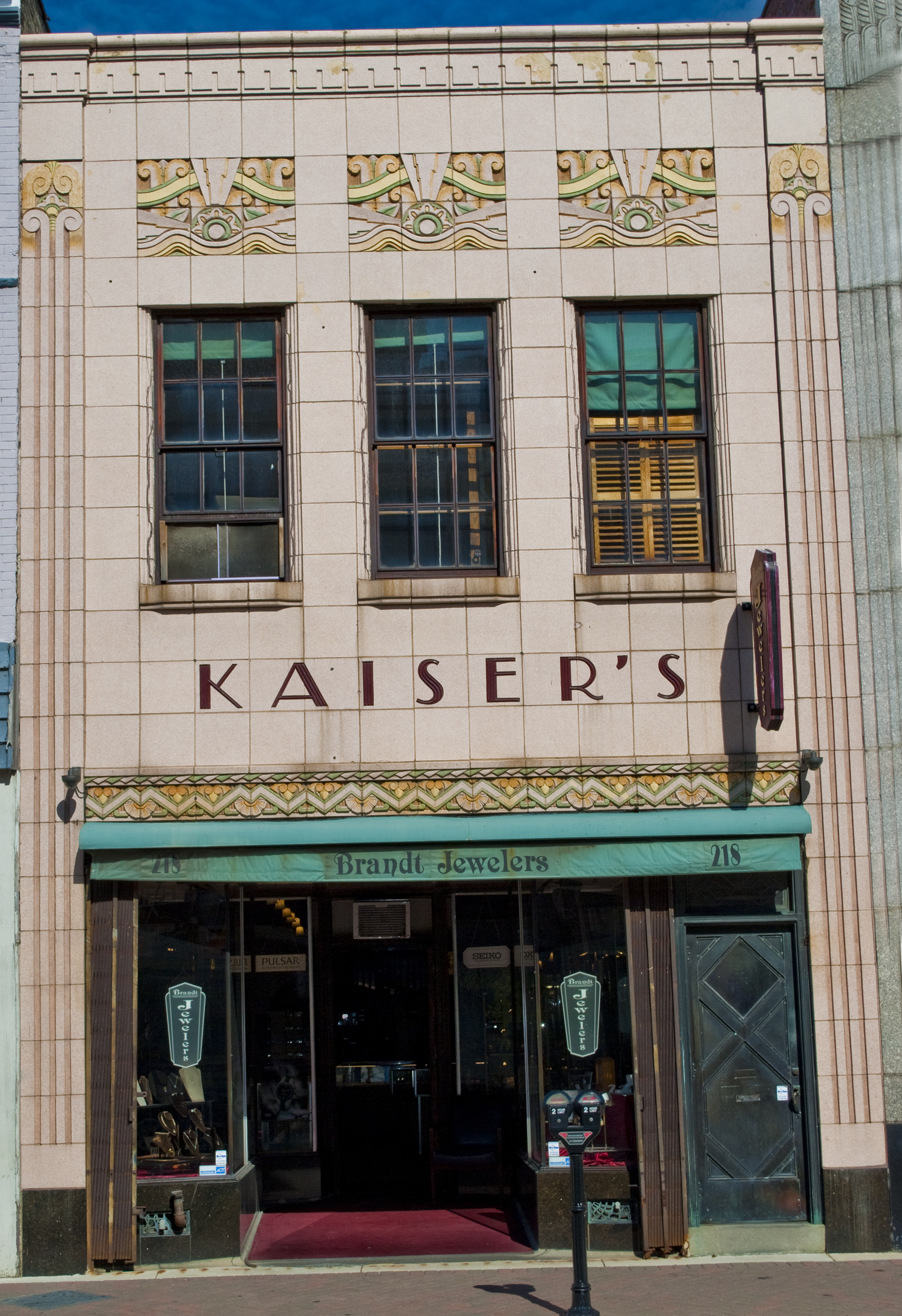

- Location within Wisconsin
- Location: 218 6th Street; Racine, Wisconsin
- Coordinates: 42.726944°N 87.783611°W
- Architect: Frank J. Hoffman (facade)
- Architectural style: Art Deco
- NRHP reference No.: 80000176
- Added to NRHP: November 25, 1980

The Kaiser's building is a historic building in downtown Racine, Wisconsin. The longtime home of Maurice and Helen Kaiser's men's clothes store, the two-story building is listed on the National Register of Historic Places primarily for its Art Deco facade, which was redesigned by Frank J. Hoffman in 1928.

== History ==
The building, located on a 20-foot-wide and 90-foot-deep lot facing Sixth Street, was in use as a hardware store as early as 1887. Previously home to the United Woolen Mills Co., Kaiser's clothing store opened in the building in 1914 and went out of business in 1957. In 1928, Frank J. Hoffman designed a new Art Deco-style glazed terra cotta facade for the building, which was built in early 1929. By 1980, when the building was listed on the National Register of Historic Places, the facade was almost unchanged from Hoffman's design, except for the installation of a neon sign advertising the building's new occupant, Trauger's Jewelry. As of 2020, the building is occupied by Brandt Jewelers, and the large Trauger's sign has been removed in favor of a smaller sign for Brandt.
