= Mitchell (automobile) =

Defunct American motor vehicle manufacturer

Mitchell Motor Car Company Mitchell-Lewis Motor Co. Mitchell Motors Company, Inc.
- Mitchell Automobile Logo

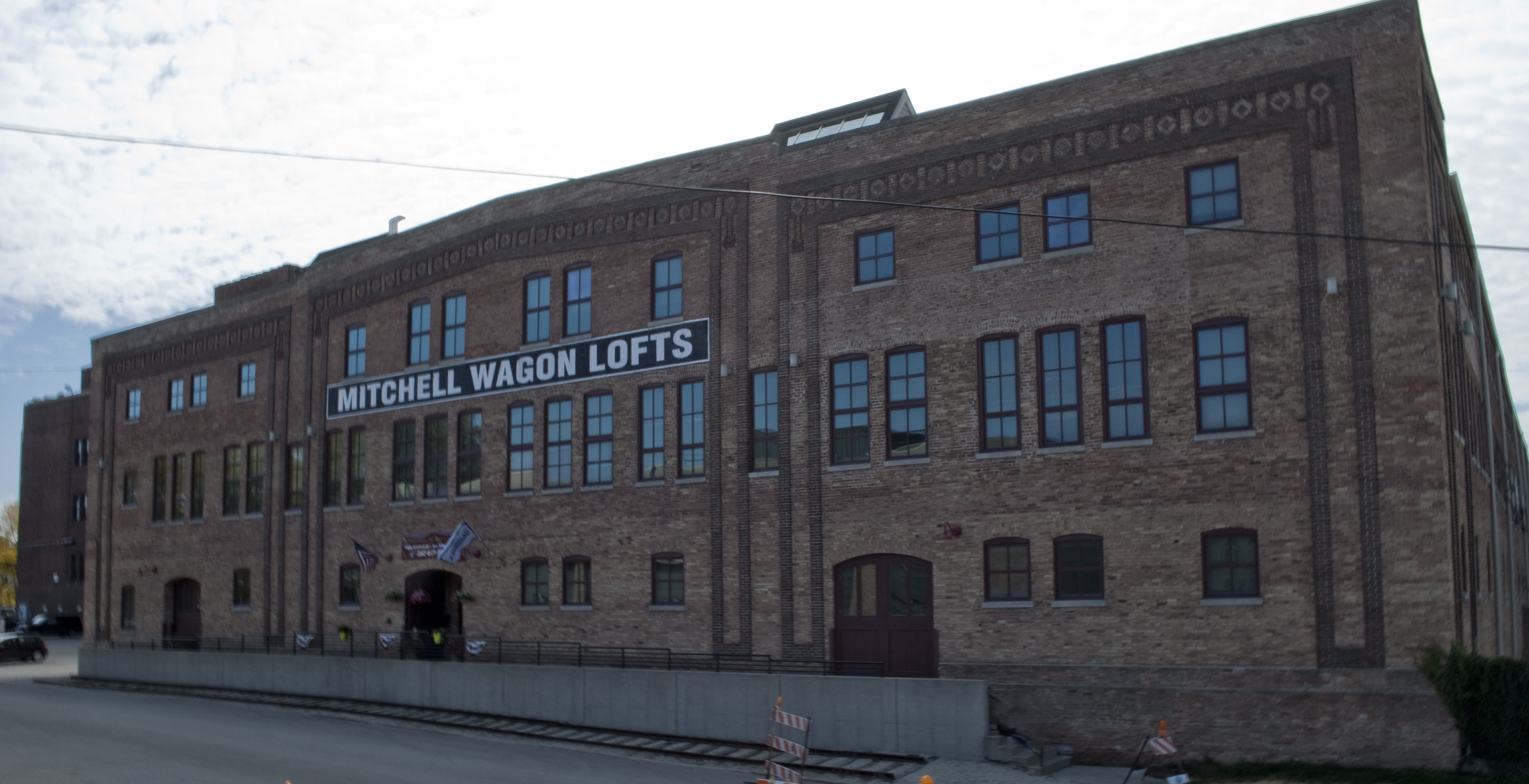
- Mitchell-Lewis Building in Racine, Wisconsin
- Type: Automobile Manufacturing
- Industry: Automotive
- Predecessor: Mitchell & Lewis Company
- Founded: 1903; 123 years ago
- Founder: William T. Lewis
- Defunct: 1923; 103 years ago
- Fate: Bankruptcy, Sold
- Headquarters: Racine, Wisconsin, United States
- Key people: William T. Lewis, William M. Lewis, John W. Bates, Rene Petard, Otis Friend
- Products: Automobiles; Automotive parts
- Production output: 86,964 (1903-1923)

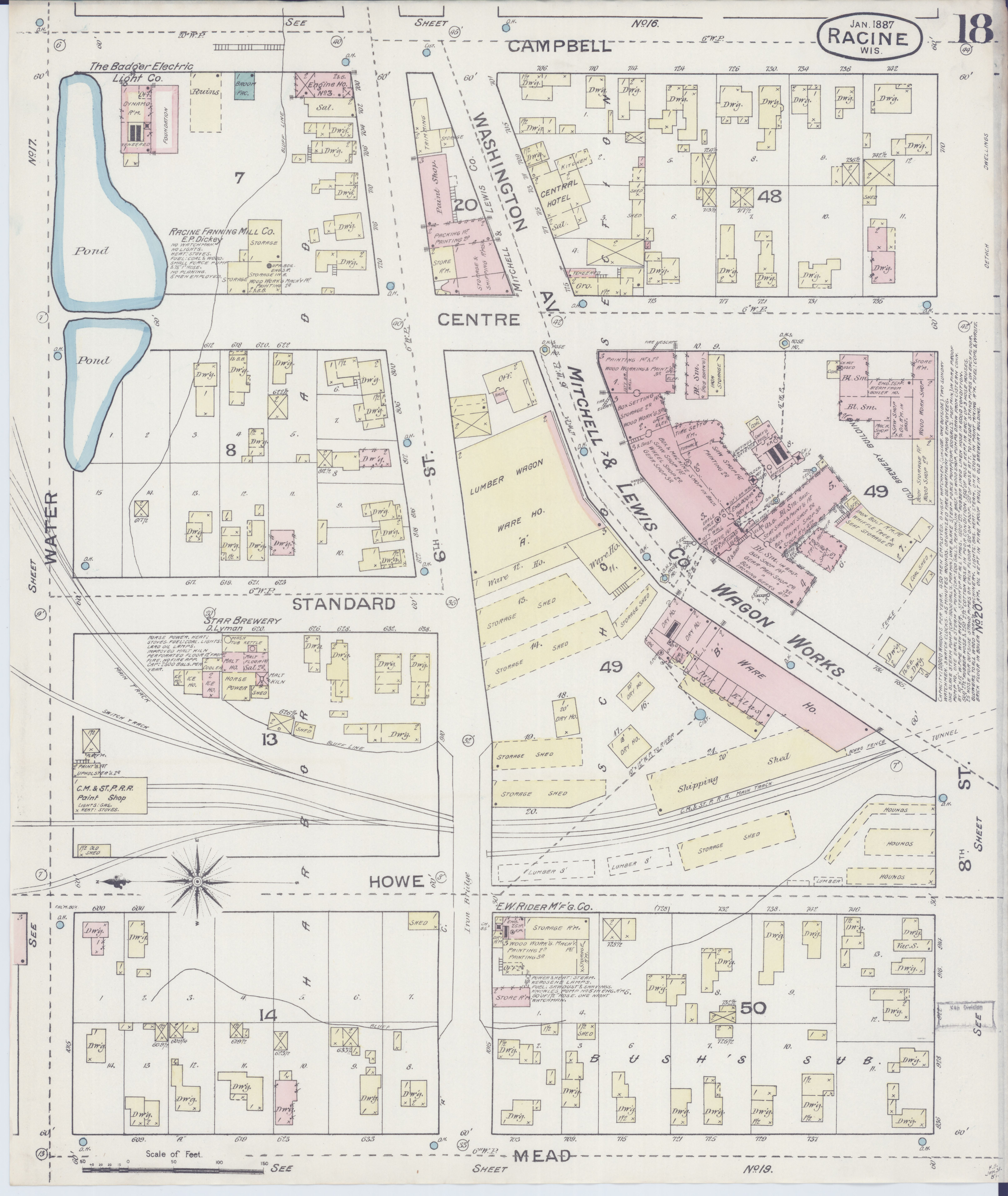
Mitchell & Lewis Company, Ltd. plant (1887)

Mitchell was a major brass-era automobile marque in Racine, Wisconsin, from 1903 to 1923.

== History ==
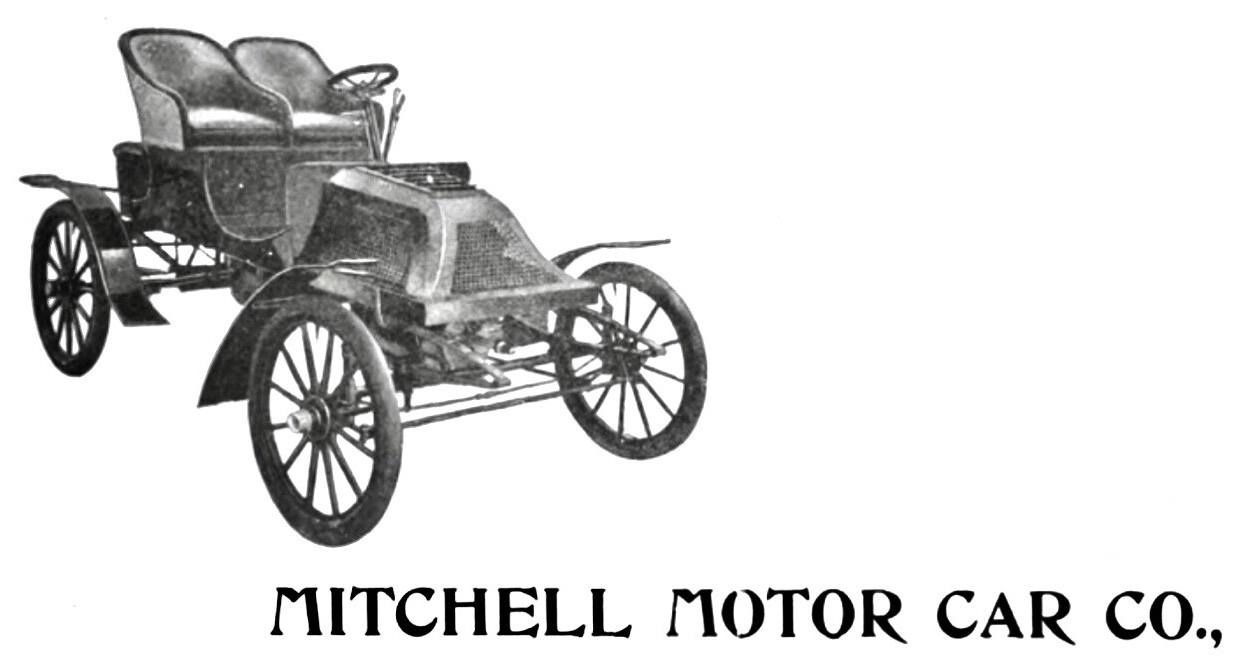
Mitchell Model B-2 (1904–1905)

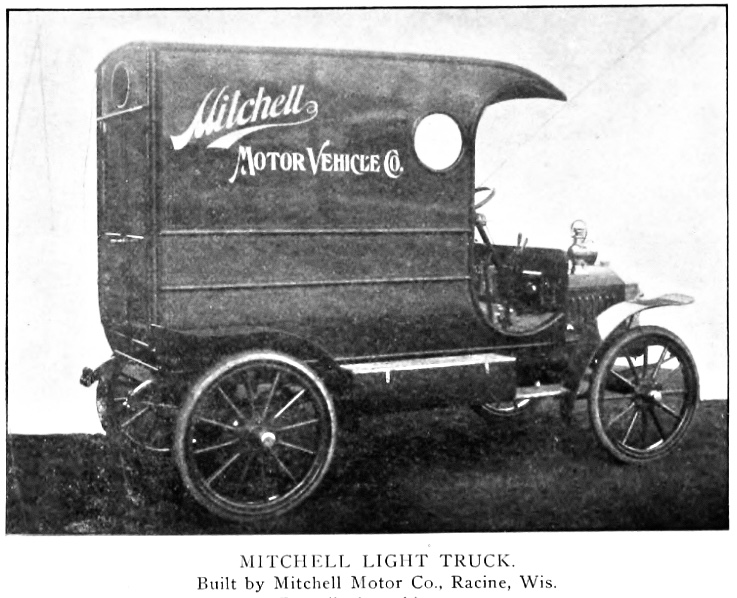
Mitchell 1t (1905–1906) 12-14 hp

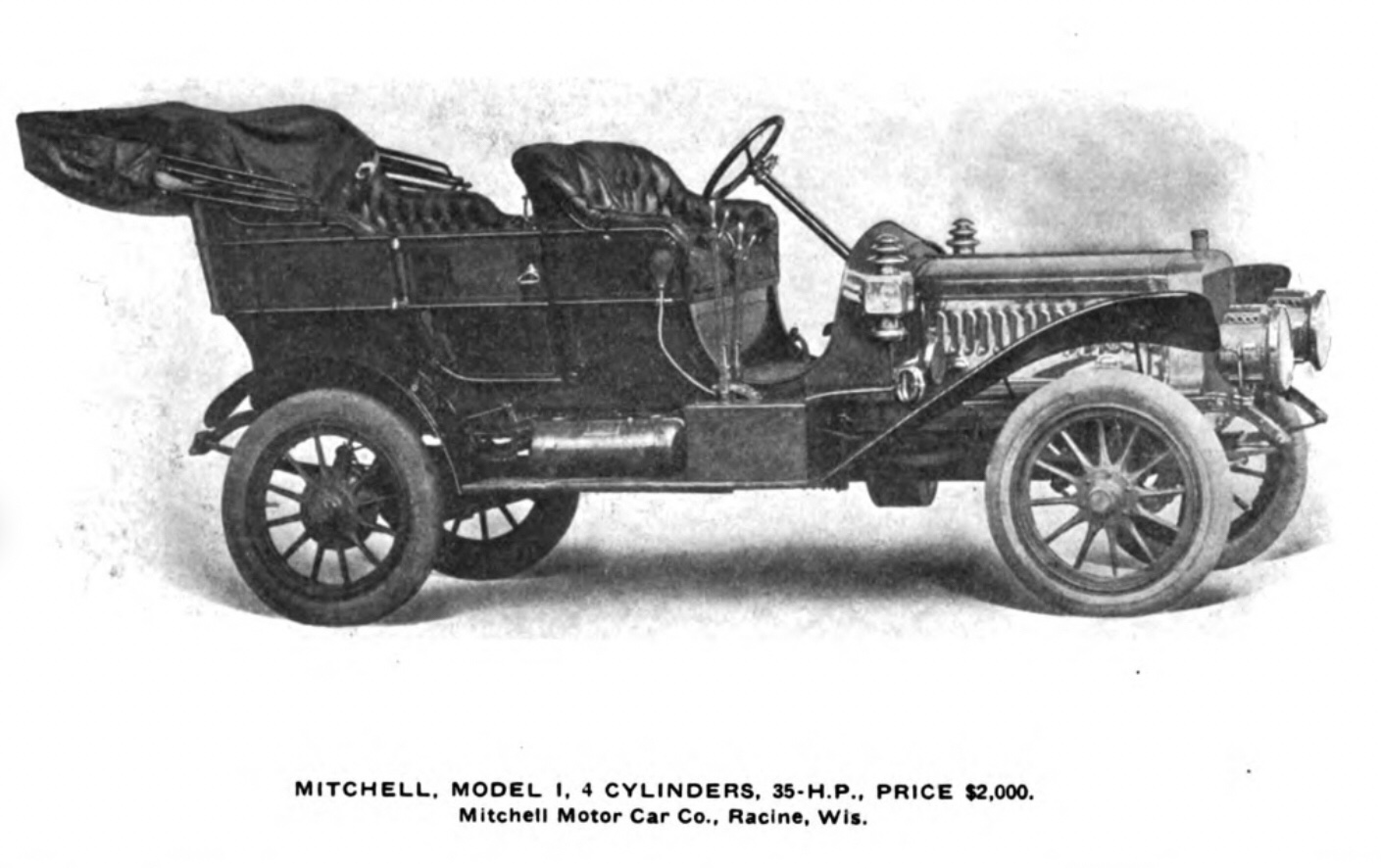
Mitchell Model I (1908)

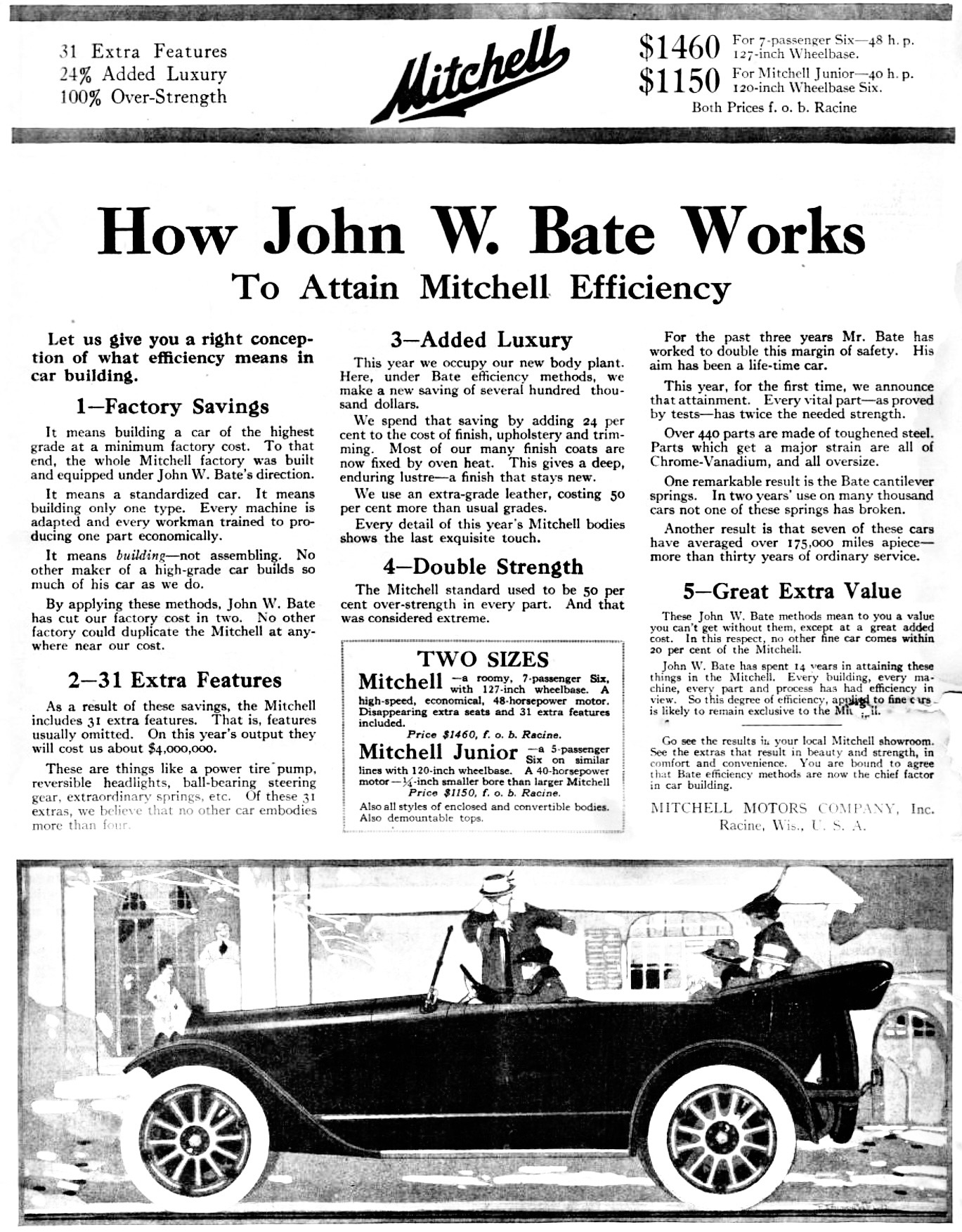
Mitchell Model D40 Junior (1917-1919)

As early as 1883, Mitchell, Lewis & Company were manufacturing two-wheel and four-wheel wagons in Racine, Wisconsin. Wisconsin Wheel Works was established in the 1890s by the wagon maker Mitchell & Lewis Company, Ltd., to manufacture bicycles and the company developed a motorcycle in 1900. The firm began manufacturing automobiles in 1903 as the Mitchell Motor Car Company.

=== Motor Cars ===
The company's first models were a chain driven and water-cooled four-stroke 4hp and two-stroke 7 hp runabout, with tiller steering and a two-speed planetary transmission. The cars were designed by John W. Bates, a Chicago engineer. In 1904, air-cooling and the introduction of a four-cylinder model, the Model B-4, were brought. By 1907 four-cylinders only were produced, improved with shaft drive on all models and all engines water-cooled. Mitchell participated in many automobile contests to show the power and reliability of their new four-cylinder cars.

William T. Lewis retired in 1910 and William M. Lewis took over. The wagon business and automobile company were combined into Mitchell-Lewis Motor Company. The 1910 line of Mitchell's included two four-cylinder models and a new six-cylinder model was introduced. The Mitchell engines were cast in pairs with three-bearing crankshafts on the fours and five-bearing crankshafts on the six-cylinders.

== Production models ==
- Mitchell Model B-2
- Mitchell Model B-4
- Mitchell 1t delivery van
- Mitchell Model R
- Mitchell Model S
- Mitchell Model T
- Mitchell Model D40 Junior (1917-1919)

=== Growth ===
Mitchell built virtually all of the components for their cars, and the company enjoyed a reputation as a quality builder of medium-priced cars. Mitchell annual production was growing steadily from 82 cars in 1904 to 1,377 in 1907, 2,946 in 1909, 5,614 in 1910 and to just over 6,000 in 1912. This made them the leading car maker in Wisconsin. A small production of trucks and buses were run from 1905 to 1908. Pricing in 1912 ran from a runabout at $950 (equivalent to $31,694 in 2025) to a limousine at $2,250 (equivalent to $75,065 in 2025) and Mitchell would remain in this mid-price market.

French engineer Rene Petard was imported to design a new series of T-head engines which were introduced for the 1913 model year. These were called "The American built French car" in advertisements. Financial issues in 1913 caused the retirement of William Mitchell Lewis from the company and with Rene Petard, he started a new company to produce a car called the Lewis. A banker, Joseph Winterbottom Jr. became president of Mitchell-Lewis.

=== Major Manufacturer ===
The firm was reorganized as Mitchell Motors Company, Inc. in 1916 and Mitchell sales manager Otis Friend took over the presidency. Sales in 1917 reached a record 10,938. Otis Friend left in 1918 and subsequently built a car of his own called the Friend in Pontiac, Michigan. A General Electric executive named D.C. Durland was appointed as the new president.

In 1916 the four-cylinder Mitchell was dropped, and a V-8 was built that year, but from 1917 only six-cylinder cars were produced. The Mitchell introduced in 1920 had a sloping radiator configuration and was given the epithet of "drunken Mitchell.” This styling mistake hurt sales. In 1922 a million-mile test was done by 109 Mitchell “White Streaks” which resulted in good publicity.

=== Fate ===
With the effects of styling mistakes, competition from mass producers of automobiles and the post-war depression, output had plummeted to less than 2,500 in both 1920 and 1921. Mitchell Motors Company, Inc. filed for bankruptcy in June 1923. Sales of unfinished automobiles and raw materials continued into 1924. In February 1924 the Mitchell factory was sold to Nash Motors and the Ajax automobile would be produced there.

== Gallery ==
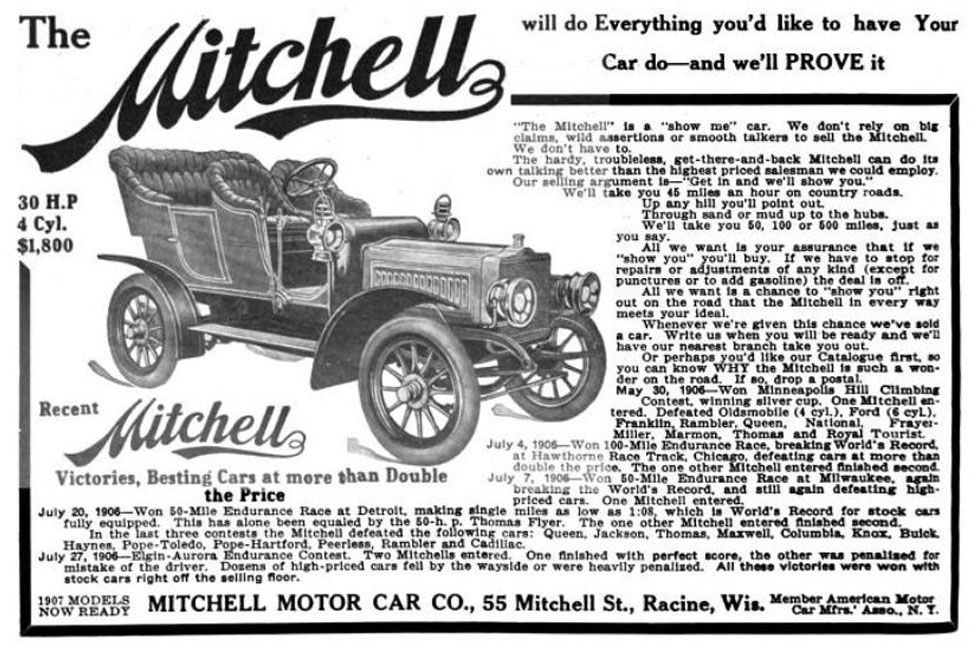
1906 Mitchell Advertisement showing victories in motor car contests

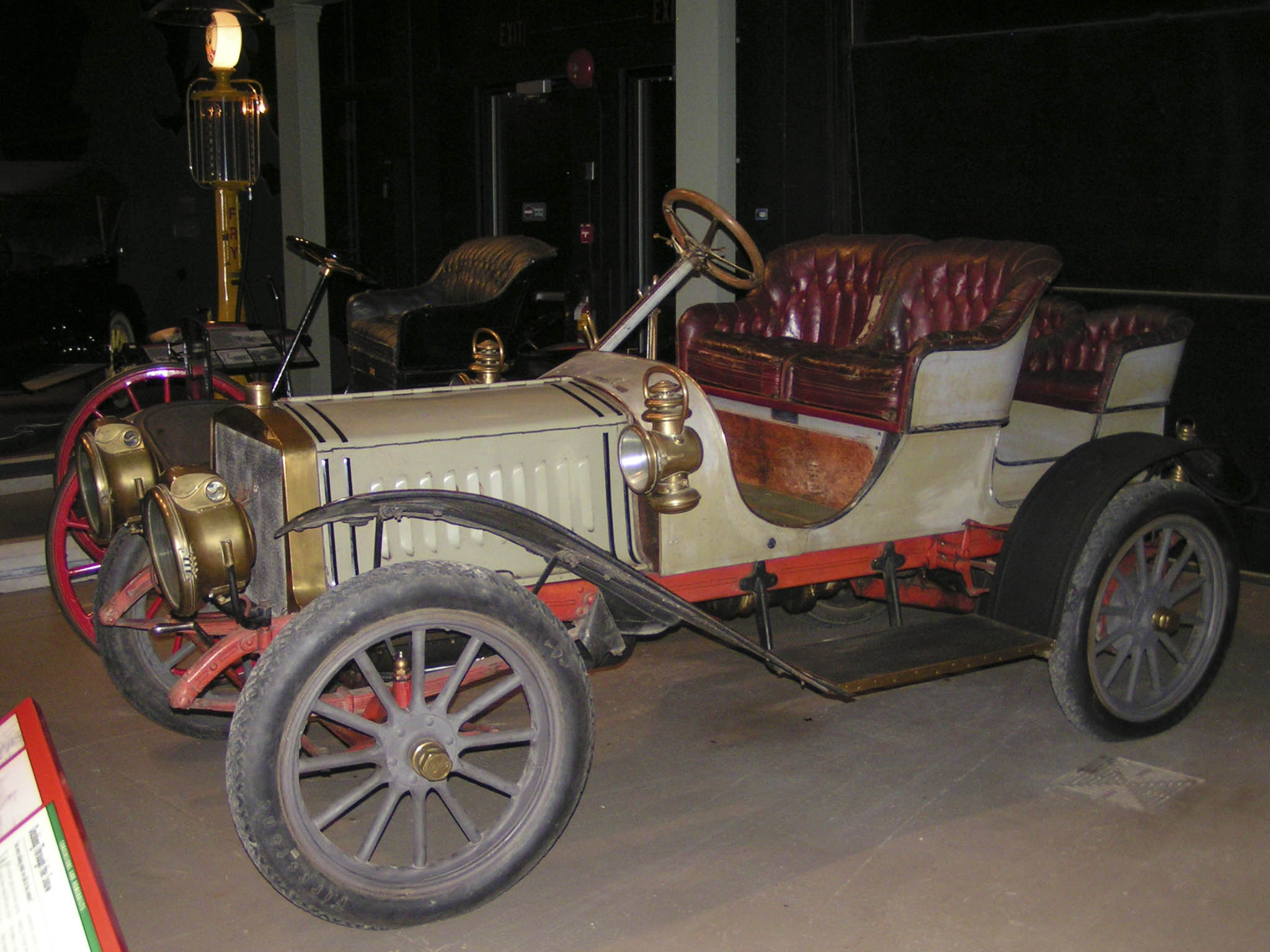
1908 Mitchell Model G Roadster

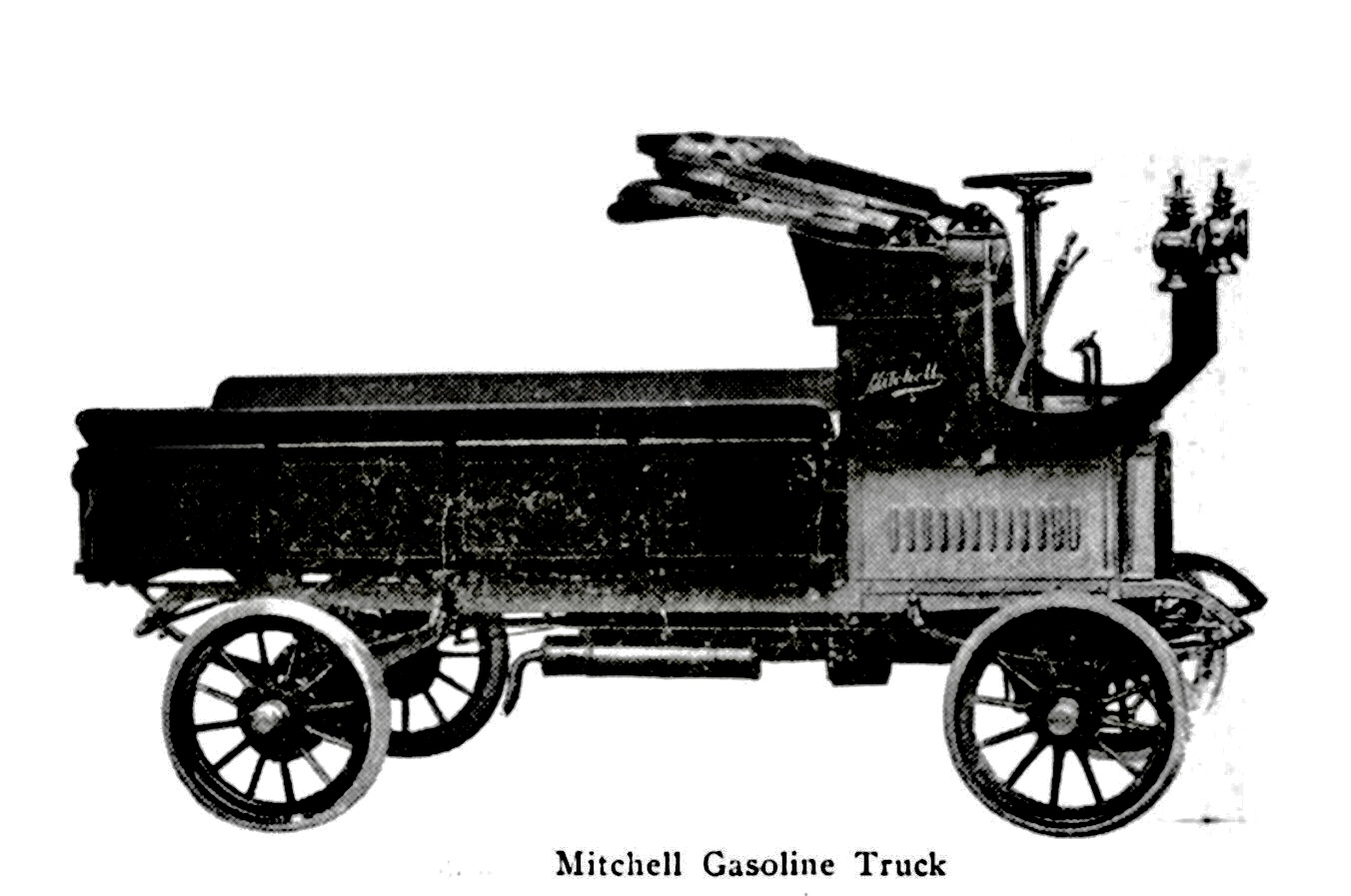
Mitchell Truck (1908)

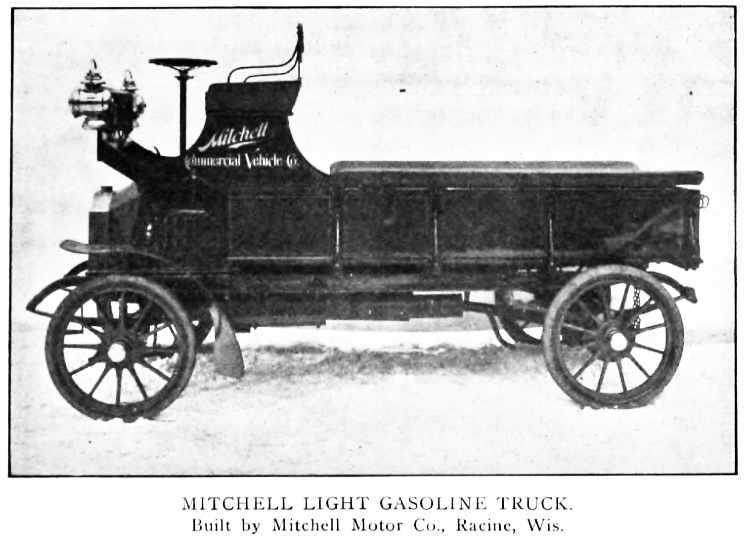
Mitchell Truck (1905–1908)

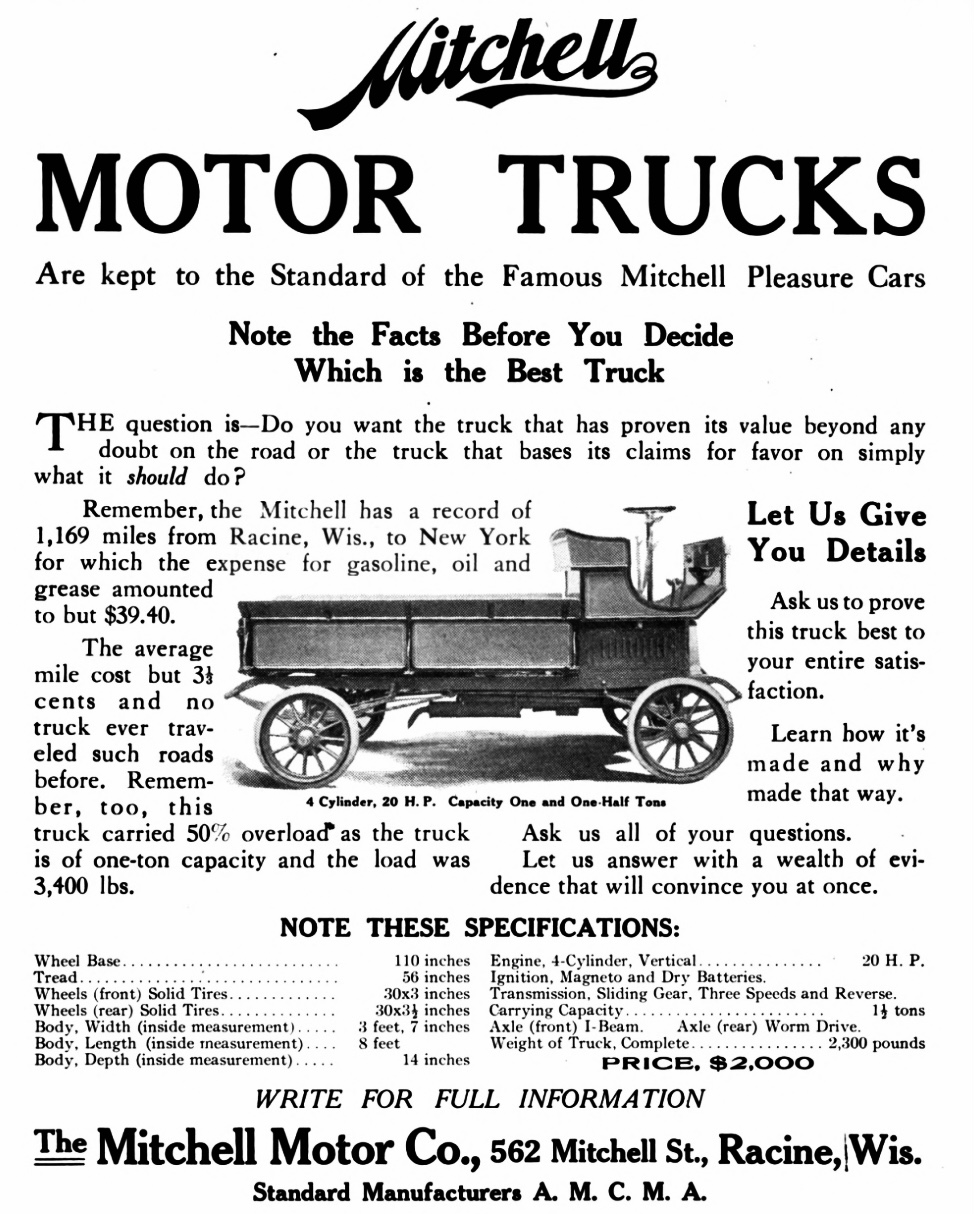
Mitchell 1,5 t Truck (1908)

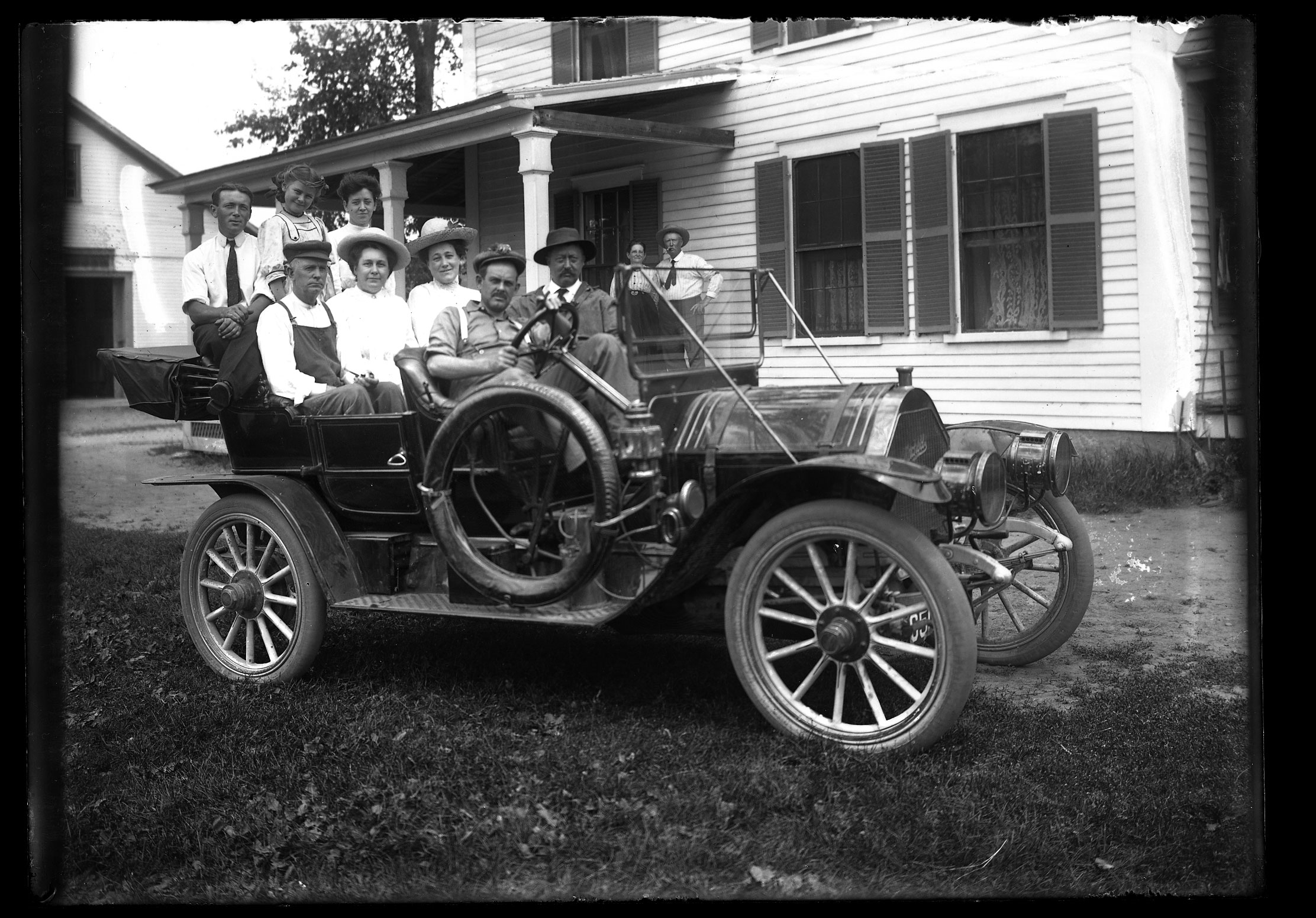
1910 Mitchell Model T Touring loaded with a family

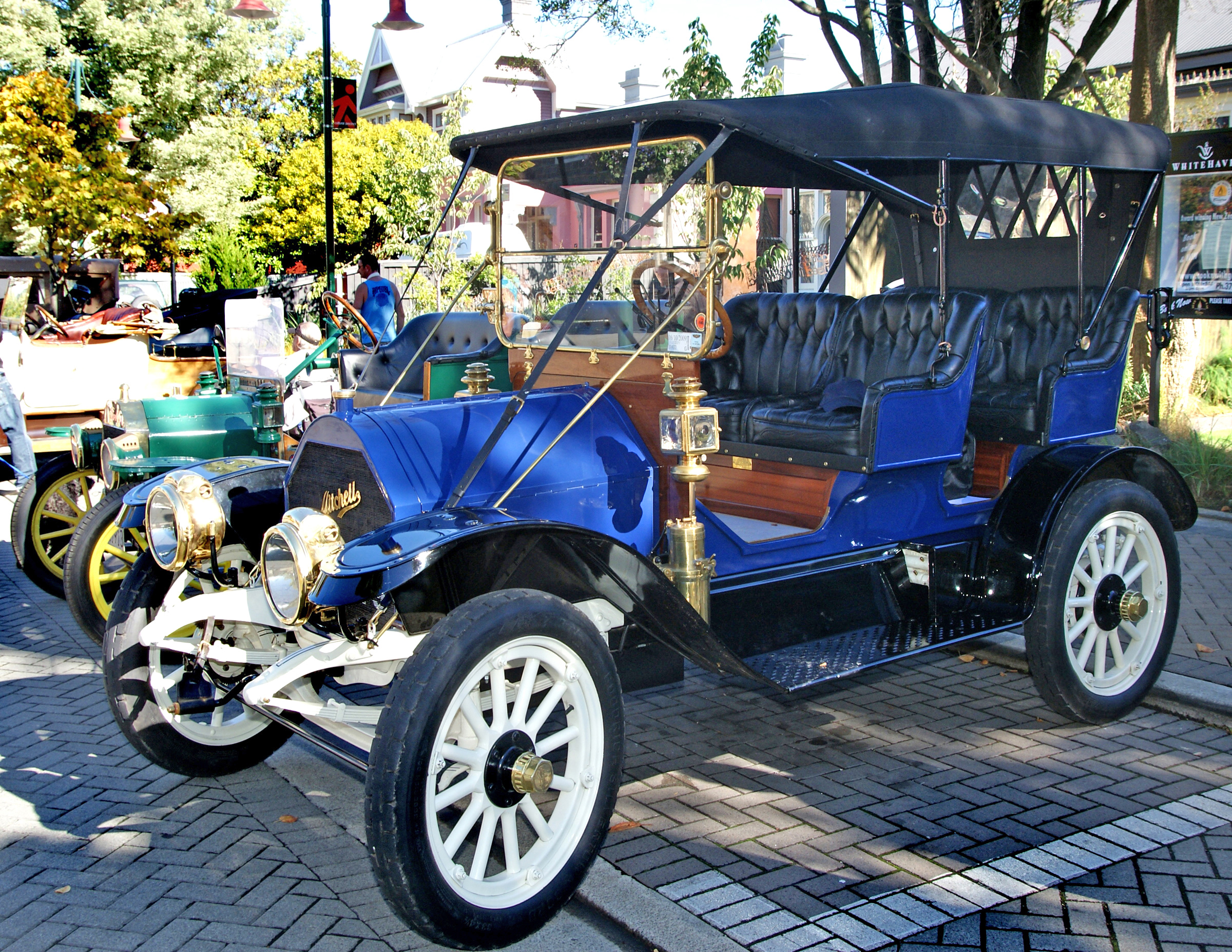
1911 Mitchell Model T Touring in Christchurch New Zealand

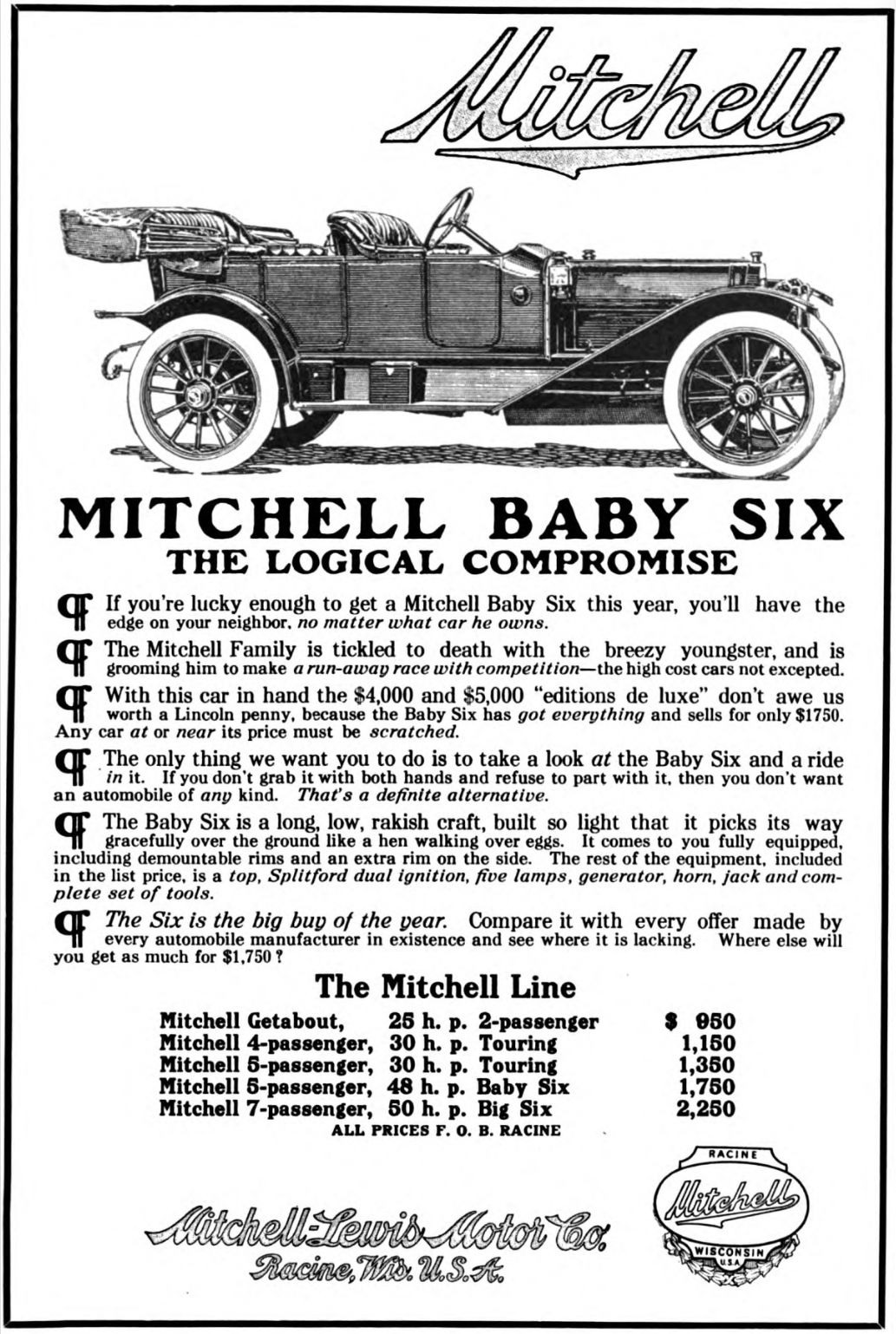
Mitchell advertisement (1911)

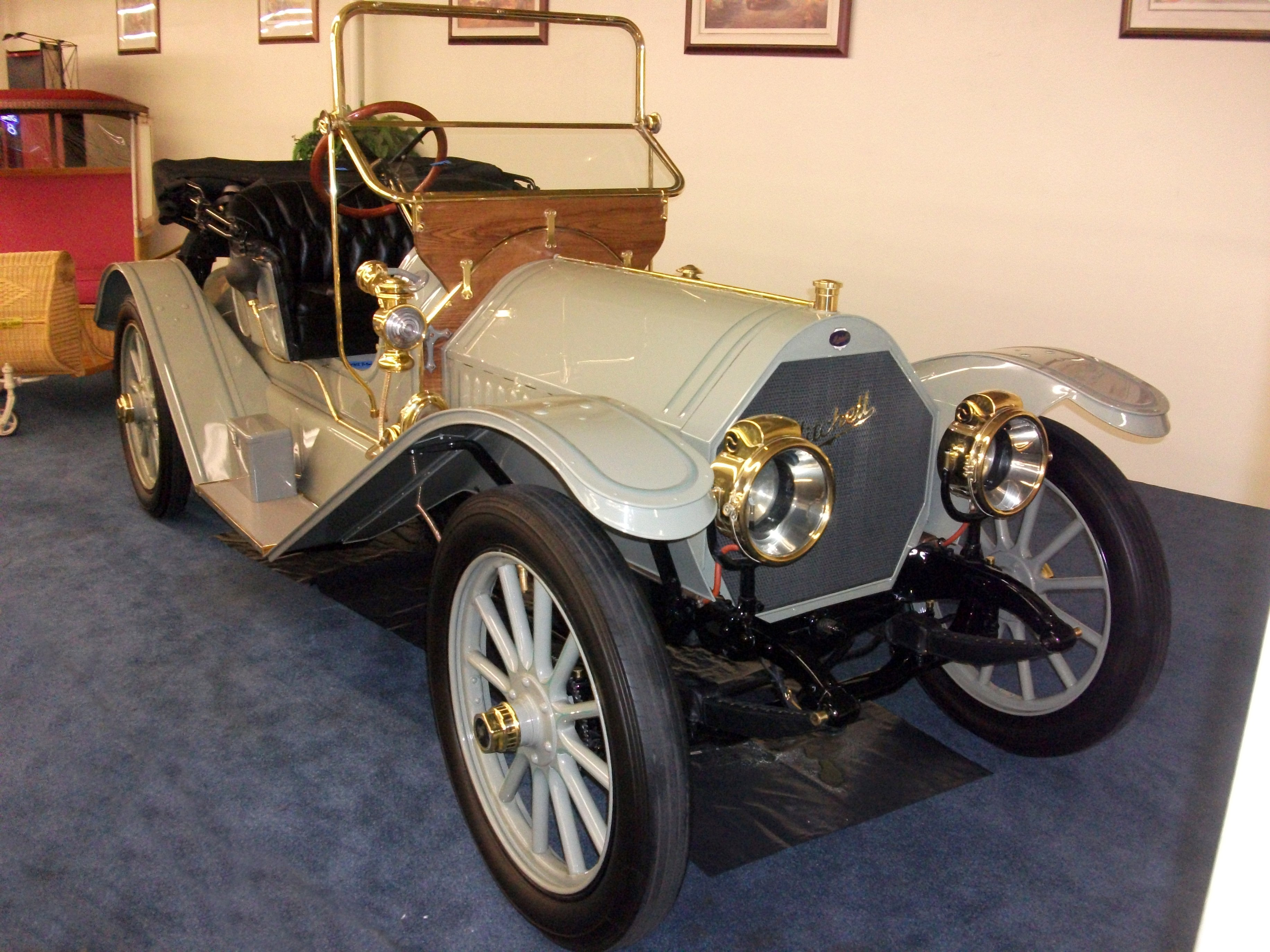
1912 Mitchell Model 7-6 Roadster

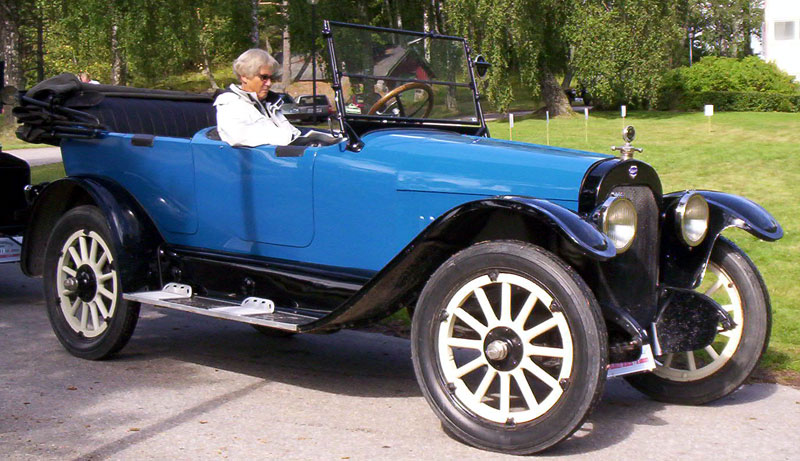
1919 Mitchell Model D-40 Touring

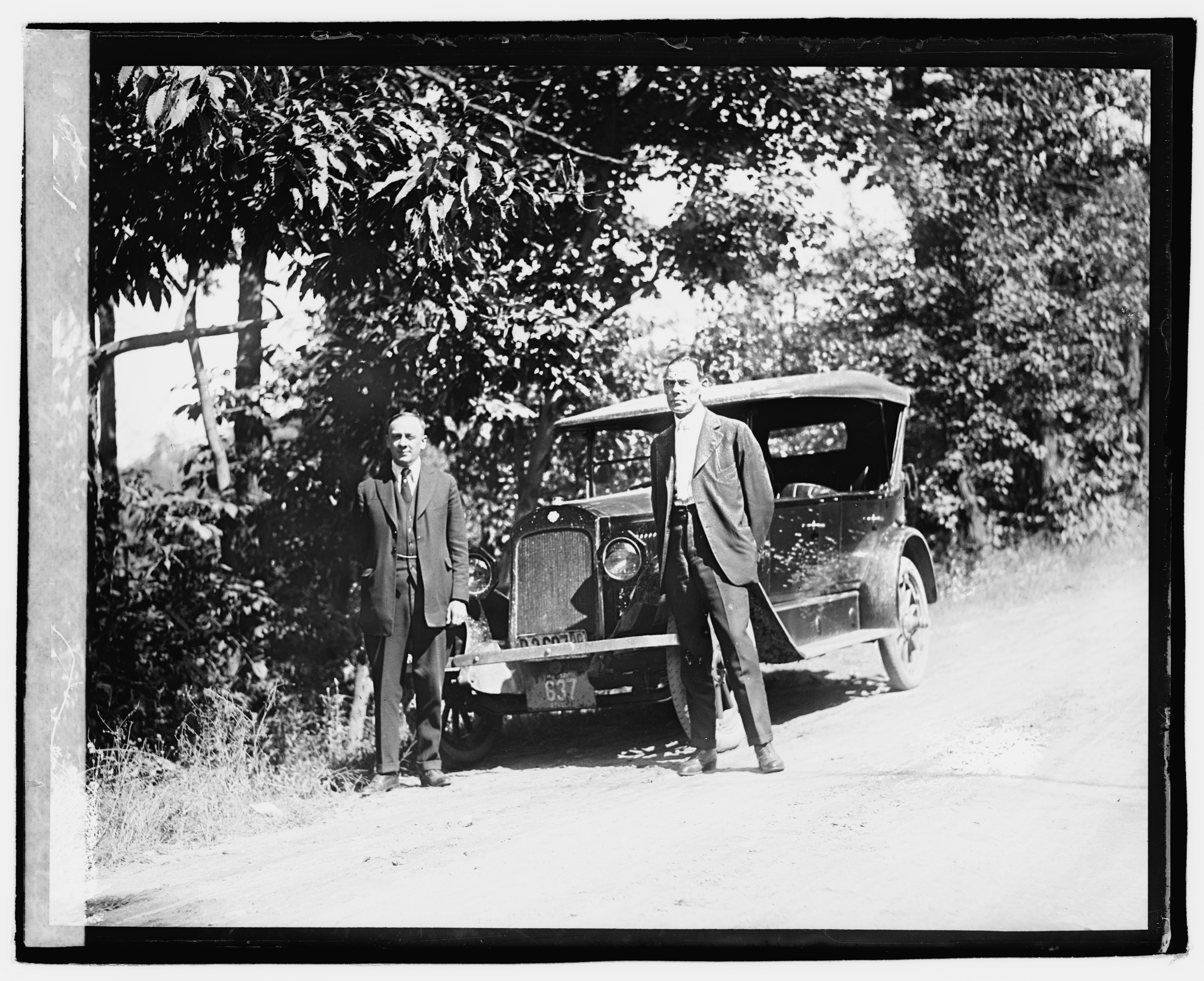
1920 Mitchell Model E-40 Touring (drunken Mitchell)

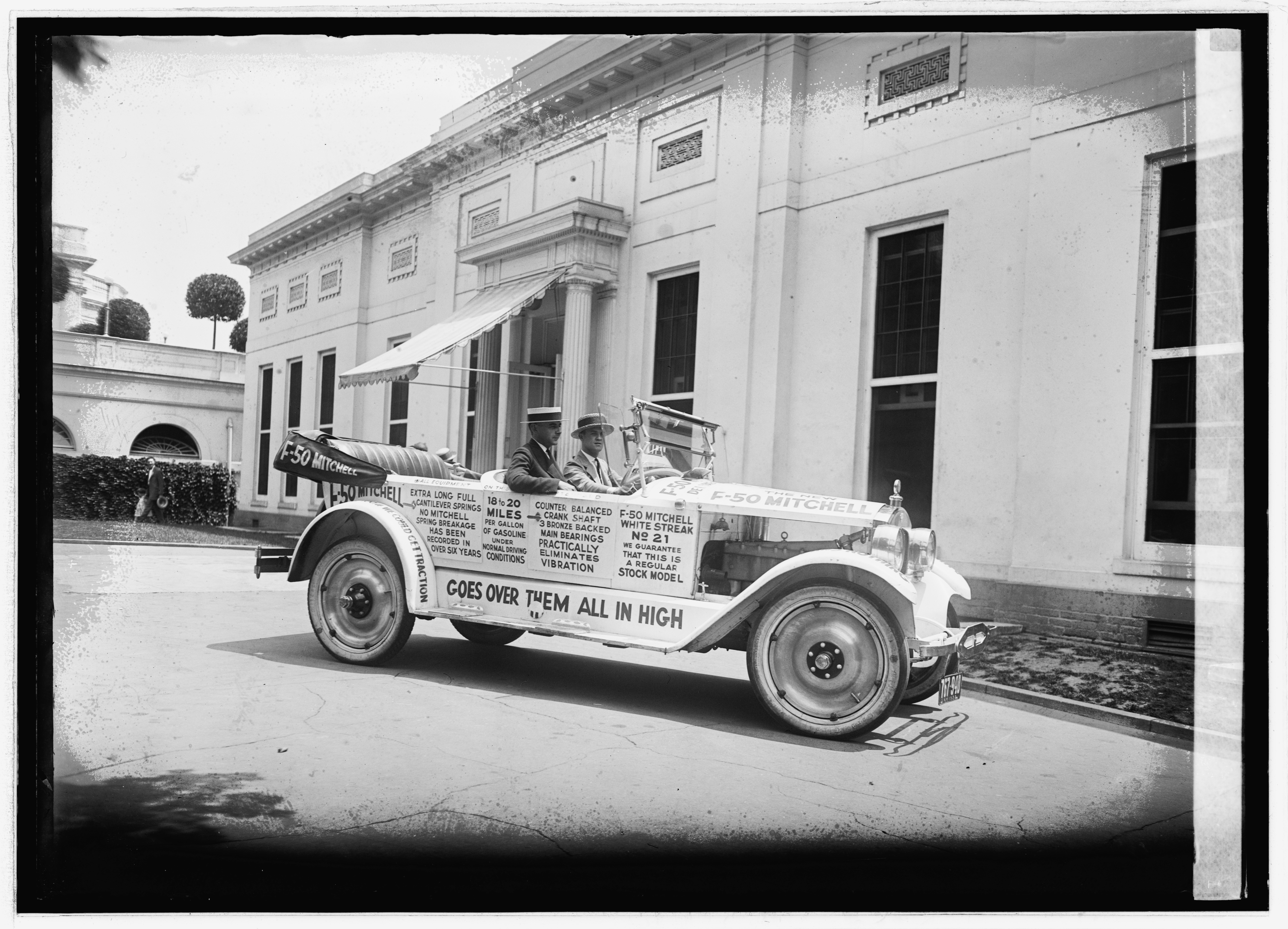
1922 Mitchell Model F-50

== See also ==
- The Mitchell Lewis Building at 815 Eighth Street in Racine was added to the National Register of Historic Places on April 20, 2005. The Racine architectural firm of Guilbert & Funston is credited with designing the building.
- The Mitchell House at 905 South Main Street was owned by Henry Mitchell of the Mitchell Wagon works and was designed by Cecil Corwin.
- Mitchell Automobiles at ConceptCarz
- Mitchell Classic Cars information and images
- Salisbury Commons Schedule of Events, 2010 Images of several early Mitchell cars on page 10-13 of the pdf.
- List of defunct United States automobile manufacturers
- Brass Era car
