= A. Arthur Guilbert =

American architect (1870–1922)

- Born: 1870
- Died: 1922 (aged 51–52)
- Education: Lehigh University; University of Michigan; Chicago School of Architecture
- Spouse: Bessie Bull (m. 1895)
- Children: 3

A. Arthur Guilbert (1870–1922) was an architect in Racine, Wisconsin.

== Biography ==
His father was born on the Isle of Guernsey and arrived in Racine in 1838. He was captain of a coffee trading vessel, a manager for the Western Union Telegraph Company, and part of the J. I. Case Threshing Machine Company.

His wife was the daughter of Henry and Mary (Warburton) Pease, who were pioneer settlers of Albany, Illinois.

Guilbert attended public high school in Racine, graduating with the class of 1888. He then attended Lehigh University of Pennsylvania, the University of Michigan and Chicago School of Architecture (graduating class of 1901). His firms designed the McMynn School, Welsh Methodist Episcopal Church, First Methodist Church (Racine, Wisconsin), Grange Avenue Methodist Church, First National Bank building, Commercial Savings Bank building, N. D. Pratt School, Elks Club House (Racine, Wisconsin), Racine Country Club, park refectories, No. 1 and No. 6 engine houses and numerous residences. He partnered with Herbert B. Rugh to form Guilbert & Rugh and was joined in 1906 by E. B. Funston until 1915, after which he worked solo.

He married Bessie M. Bull, daughter of Stephen Bull, who was one of Racine's most distinguished citizens and businessmen, in 1895. Their children were F. Warburton Guilbert, Gordon McKenzie Guilbert, and Ellen Katherine Kellogg Guilbert.

Guilbert was a high-ranking Mason, a member of the Elks, and a member of the Somerset Club, the Country Club (including as president from 1915 until 1916), the Wisconsin State Golf Association (including as president), the University Club of Milwaukee and the Racine Commercial Club.

McMynn school was torn down when McMynn Tower (Senior apartments) was built circa 1975. It was located across from Memorial Hall. Lucas Bradley, a local and builder may also have been involved in the building work.
