= Y Ford Gron (Scranton) =

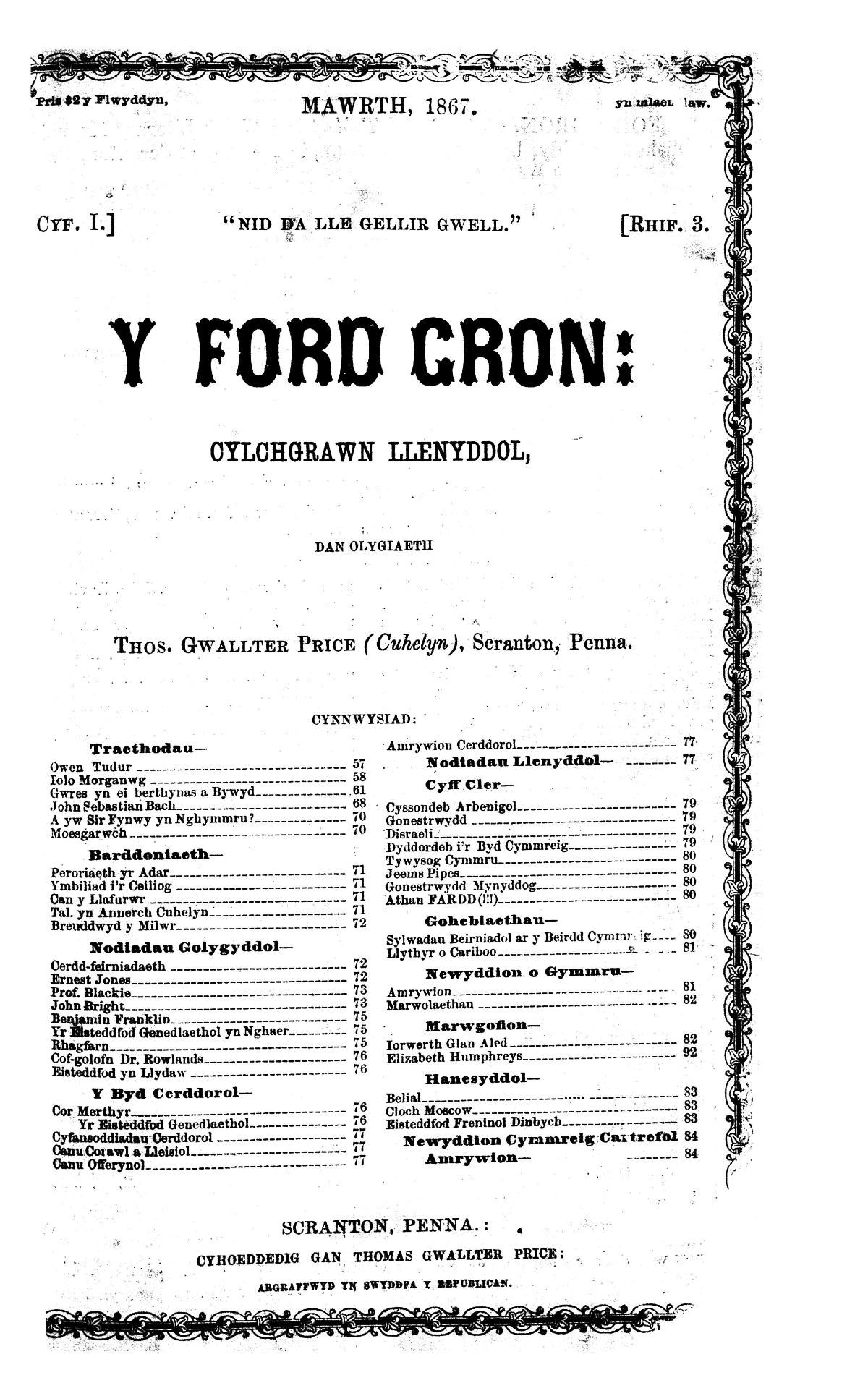
Ford gron (Scranton) (Welsh Journal)

Y Ford Gron (Scranton) was a 19th-century Welsh language periodical first produced in January 1867, in Scranton, Pennsylvania, by Thomas Walter Price and William Aubrey Powell. Its content, literary articles and reviews, and poetry and news from Wales, was aimed at the Welsh American population. The ability of Welsh migrants to America to maintain their language and culture are evident in this publication and others such as Y Drych and Yr Amserau.

== See also ==
- Y Ford Gron - A Welsh language magazine of the same name, published in Wales between 1930 and 1935.
