= Birch Lodge =

- Birch Lodge Hospital and Summer Resort Sanitarium
- U.S. National Register of Historic Places
- Michigan State Historic Site
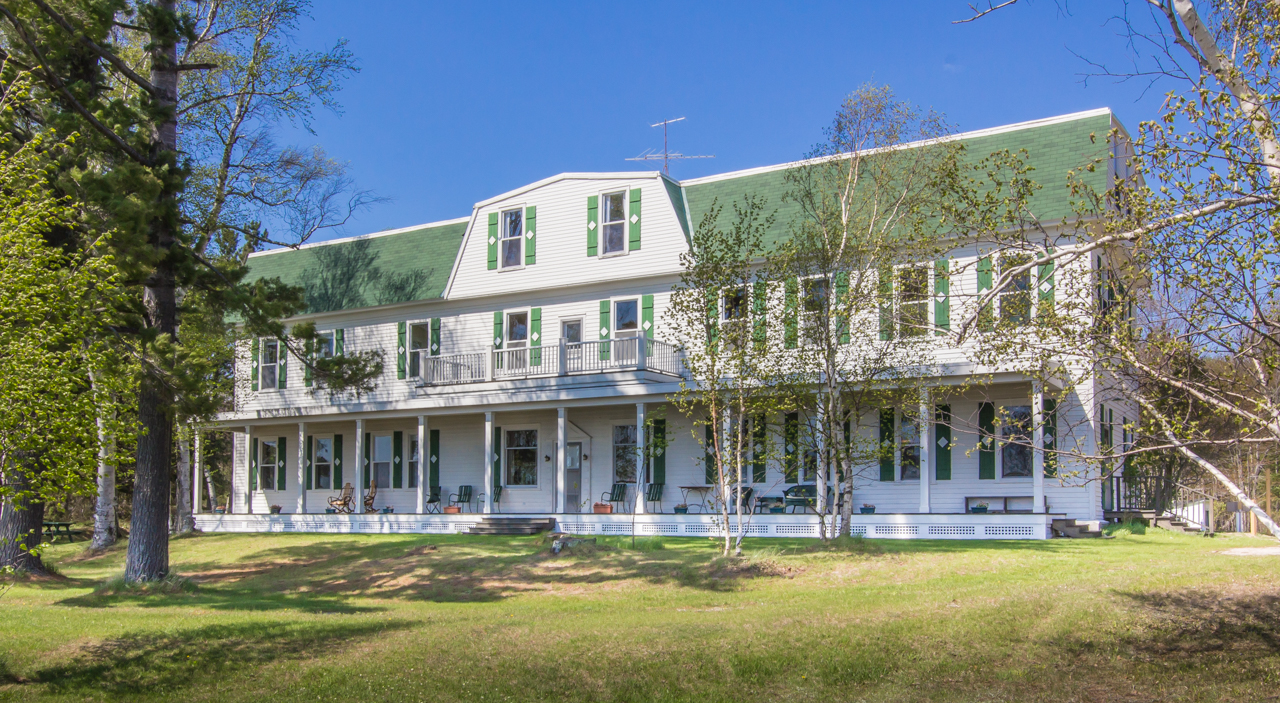
- Birch Lodge, c. 1912

- Location within Michigan Location within the United States
- Interactive map
- Location: Co. Rt. H-40, .6 mi. W of MI 123, Trout Lake, Michigan
- Coordinates: 46°11′26″N 85°1′58″W
- Area: 20 acres (8.1 ha)
- Built: 1911
- Built by: H. Emery
- Architect: Dr. Edgar Ford
- NRHP reference No.: 96001376

Significant dates
- Added to NRHP: November 29, 1996
- Designated MSHS: November 20, 1987

The Birch Lodge, also known as the Birch Lodge Hospital and Summer Resort Sanitarium or the Trout Lake Sanitarium, is a resort facility located on the northern shore of Trout Lake, off County Route H-40, .6 miles (0.97 km) west of MI-123, in Trout Lake Township, Michigan. It was listed on the National Register of Historic Places in 1996 and designated a Michigan State Historic Site in 1987.

== History ==
Birch Lodge was founded as one of a crop of resorts built in upper Michigan around the beginning of the 20th century. It was started by Dr. Edgar David Ford and his wife Cornelia of Cambria, Wisconsin as a combination of a summer resort as tuberculosis sanitorium. The Fords obtained property on Trout Lake in 1911 and hired H. Emery, also of Cambria, to construct the lodge, designing it as a resort that combined outdoor recreation and medical health. However, before the lodge opened, Edgar Ford died of rabies. Despite this, the resort was opened in 1912 by Cornelia Ford and her sons.

However, the Birch Lodge Hospital quickly ran into financial trouble. In 1915, the title was transferred to mortgage holder Oliver W. Smith. One of the first mounted State Constabulary units (a precursor to the state police) occupied the site from 1918 - 1922, and it was used as a private residence for a time. Charles and Estelle Moore purchased Birch Lodge in 1926. They re-established the property as a resort and operated it until 1938. The resort went through three more owners and some remodeling until Cliff and Anna Badgley purchased it in 1952. The Badgleys constructed an eight-room brick motel on the property in 1964. Cliff Badgley died in 1981, but Anna continued to operate the resort. The lodge was closed in 1985, but the motel was operated until Anna died in 2006. In 2010 the property was sold to new owners, who reopened it.

== Description ==
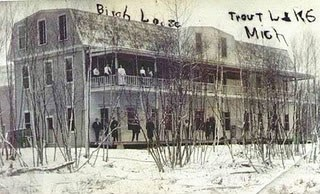
Birch Lodge c 1912

Birch Lodge is situated on 20 acres located along the northern shore of Trout Lake. When it opened, the lodge had cottages, a recreation room, boating equipment, and a dancing pavilion; it also boasted hospital facilities such as an operating room and a linen room. There are currently six structures on the property: the main lodge, three frame utility buildings that were once cabins, and two log cabins. The largest of these, the main lodge, is a three-story wood-framed structure on a fieldstone foundation, built in 1911. It is constructed on a T-plan and is clad primarily in clapboard, although the third-floor mansard gables are now covered with vinyl siding. The windows are rectangular lights, and set between green-painted shutters accented with diamond shapes. The roof is clad in asphalt shingling. Much of the interior furnishings of the lodge date to its construction, and it remains a well-preserved example of early 20th century resort architecture.
