= David R. Jones (architect) =

Welsh-American architect and poet

- Born: October 24, 1832; Dolwyddelan, Wales
- Died: February 16, 1915 (aged 82); Cambria, Wisconsin
- Occupation: Architect

David Richard Jones (October 24, 1832 – February 16, 1915) was a Welsh-American architect and poet.

== Early life ==
Jones was born October 24, 1832, in Dolwyddelan, North Wales, the son of Richard James Jones and Ann Jones. On September 2, 1845, Richard, Ann, and family (five boys and one girl) immigrated to the United States. Richard purchased 160 acres of government land east of the village of Cambria, Wisconsin. He built a log house and moved there in the spring of 1846. The farm was named Oakland. In May 1852, David R. left Oakland for the city of Racine, Wisconsin, where he apprenticed with architect Lucas Bradley. His brother, Evan O. Jones, remained in Cambria and was a member of the Wisconsin State Assembly and Senate.

== Architecture ==
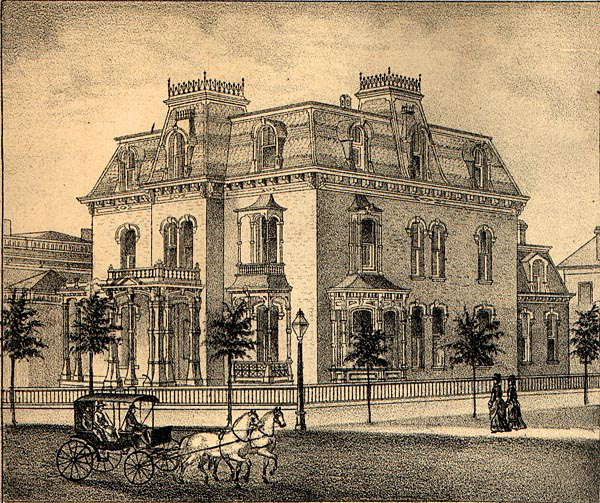
David Atwood House, Madison

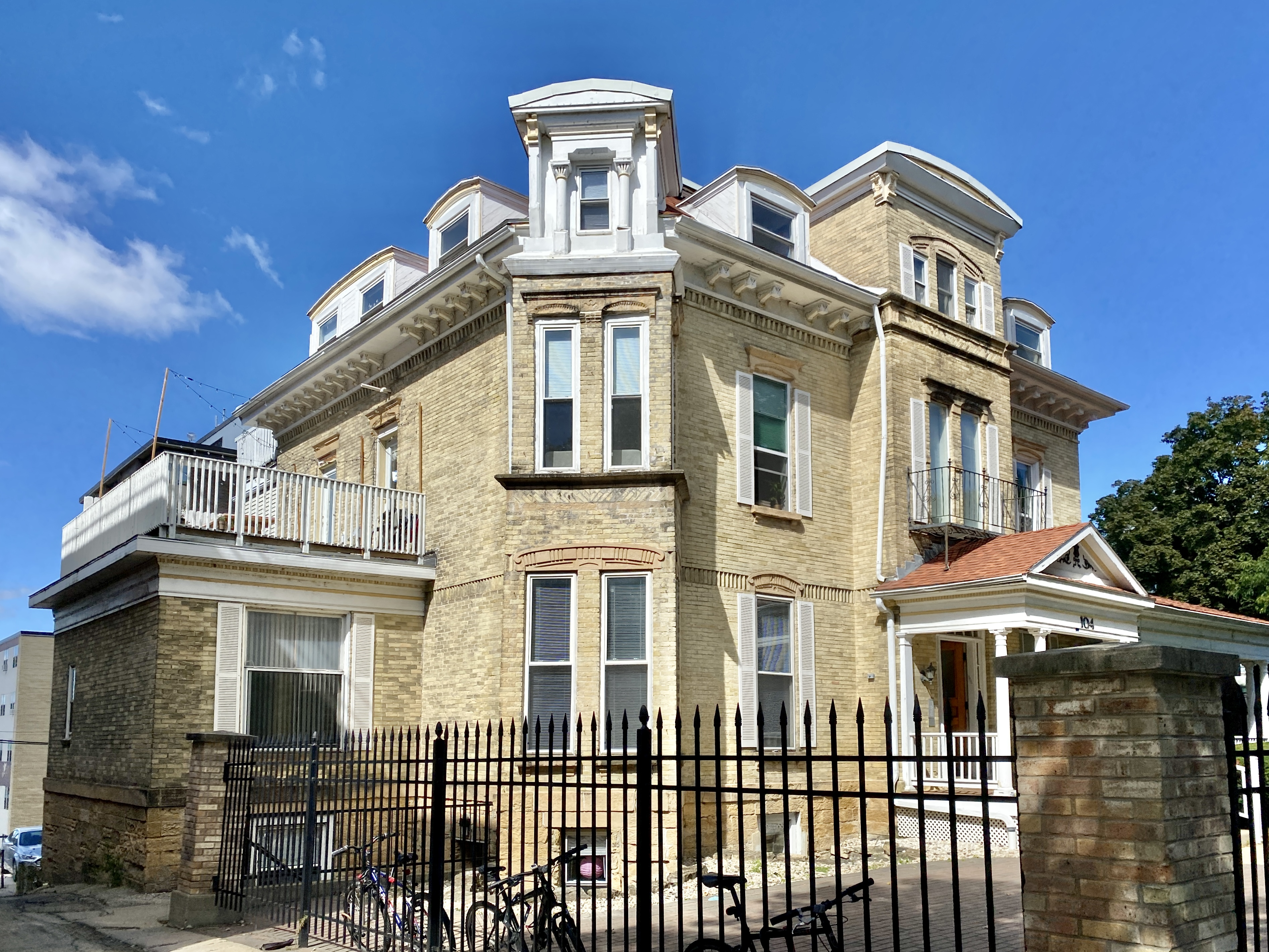
Romanzo Bunn House, Madison

Jones worked in Racine for about four years before he returned to Cambria. While in Cambria he designed and built many buildings in the area, along with maintaining a lumber yard. In 1871 he left Cambria to become the head draftsman for architect Abraham Radcliffe of St. Paul, Minnesota. In the spring of 1873, Jones returned to Wisconsin and started his own practice in Madison. He set up office on Main Street across from the Capitol. He maintained the office in Madison until 1885.

One of his first commissions in Madison was a mansion for General David Atwood, the founder and publisher of the Wisconsin State Journal. Atwood lauded Jones' skill in his paper, and commissions for residences of other prominent Madisonians were soon to follow, including Mayor Silas U. Pinney, Colonel C.G. Thorton, banker Lucien Hanks, and Judge Romanzo Bunn. Within seven years of settling in Madison, Jones had designed 61 buildings in the city and had overseen alterations and additions to another 47.

Madison was becoming a resort city in the 1870s and 1880s, and two of Jones' commissions were in response to this development. He designed the buildings for the Monona Lake Assembly Chautauqua and the Tonyawatha Resort Hotel during these decades. Much of his other work was for the Wisconsin state government. He designed buildings for the Normal Schools at Whitewater, Platteville, and River Falls. He also designed buildings at the Mendota Insane Asylum, the University of Wisconsin in Madison, and the north and south wings of the Wisconsin State Capitol building.

Jones had several students and employees within his firm. His students were Herman Esser, Owen J. Williams, and James G. Chandler. He employed Edward Stark, Frederick W. Paunach, William Kleinpell, and J. Albert Swenon.

In 1880 and 1881 Jones had a branch office in Racine, Wisconsin. His head draftsman was James Gilbert Chandler, who worked for him in the Racine office and later took over the business in 1882.

== The Capitol disaster ==
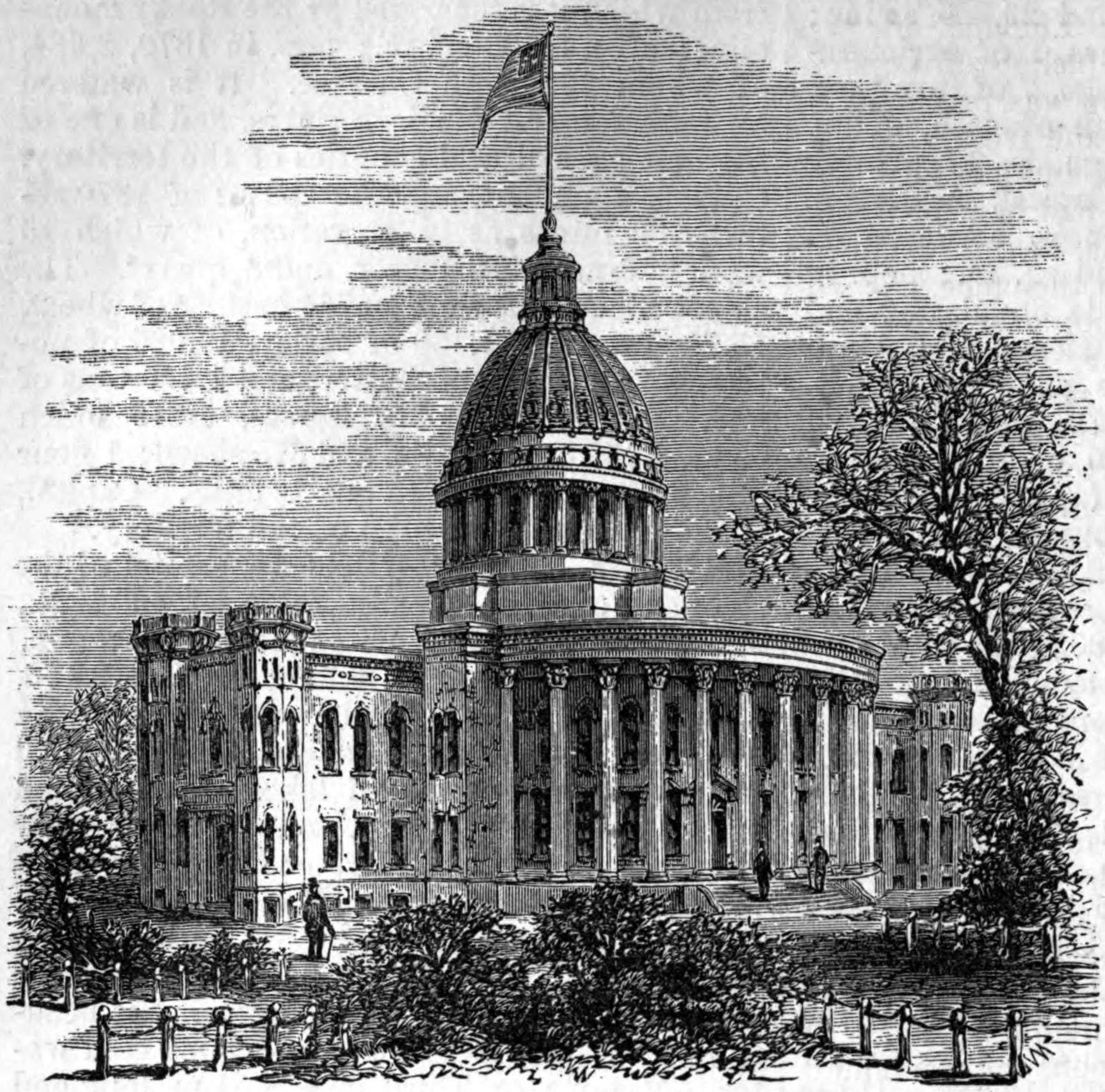
The Wisconsin State Capitol, 1879

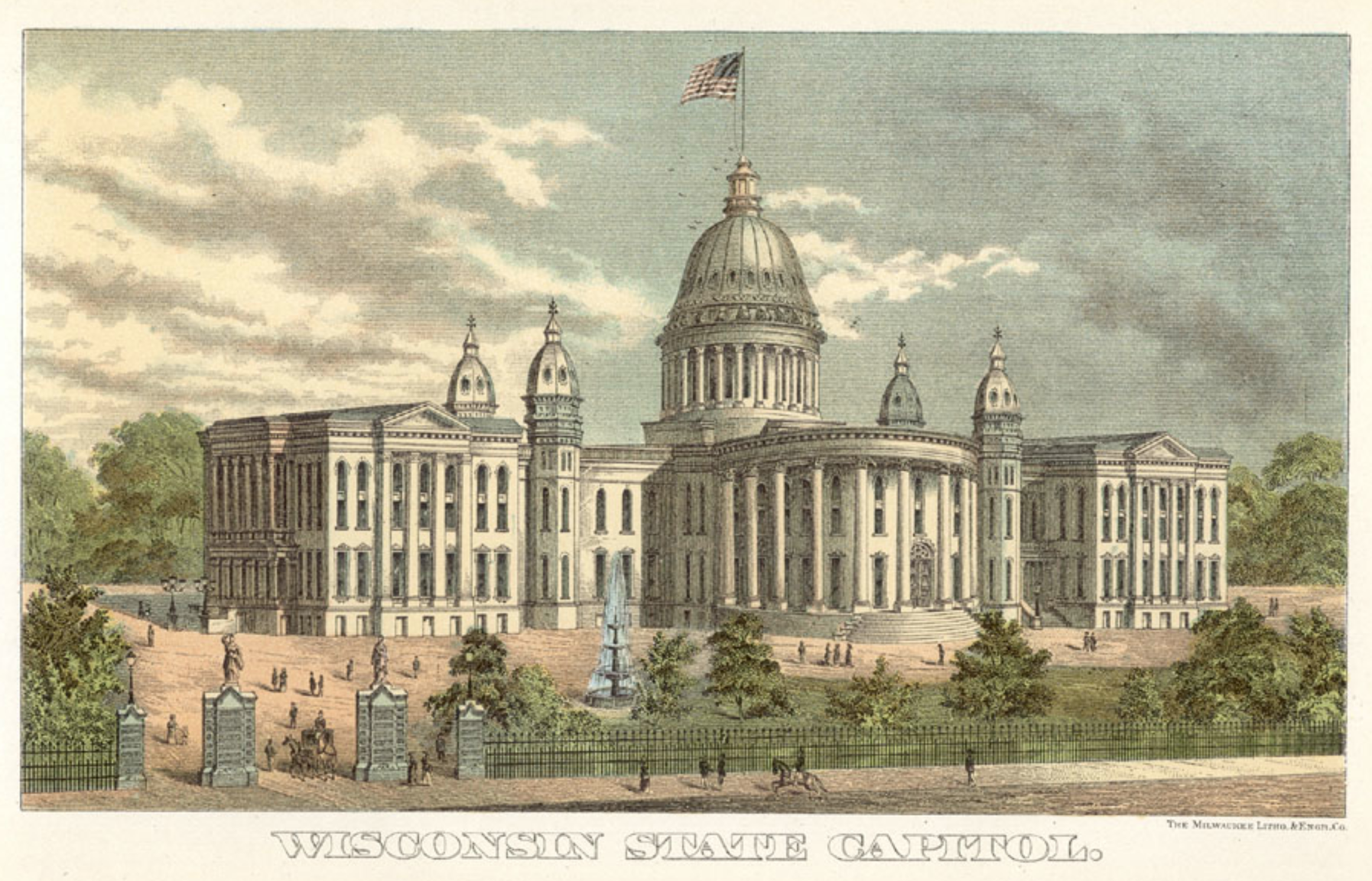
The Wisconsin State Capitol, 1887

In the spring of 1882, the Wisconsin State Legislature approved $200,000 for the extension of the Wisconsin State Capitol. An architectural competition was held and Jones was awarded the commission. In May of that year bids were sought, with a project completion date of January 1, 1884. Twice the project went out for bids only to exceed the $200,000 approved by the state legislature. Twice Jones was requested to revise the plans in order to bring down the bids. One of the revisions eliminated the octagonal towers, and the lower ranks of iron columns were to be replaced with stone piers. Eventually the firm of Bentley and Nowlan was the successful bidder with a bid of $188,370. By late 1883 the north wing was all but completed. The south wing required some additional work to be structurally complete. On November 8, at 1:40 pm, the south wing collapsed, trapping and killing eight workmen and injuring many others. Immediately after, Governor Jeremiah Rusk called together a group of specialists to determine the cause. The group was made up of Albert C. Nash, a prominent architect from Ohio, Godfrey Ludwig, the superintendent of public buildings for Cincinnati, Ohio, Carl F. Struck, an architect from Minneapolis, and J.R. Willett, an architect from Chicago. Their report placed the blame on substandard materials, specifically the cast iron columns. The day after the disaster, a coroner's inquest was impaneled. That inquest was led by Dane County District Attorney Robert M. La Follette. "The panel found Nowlan culpable of "improperly and insufficiently" repairing a fault in the second-story pier near the southeast corner of the extension, which they found to have contributed to the collapse of the south wing. The panel also found D. R. Jones and a consulting Milwaukee architect, Henry C. Koch, guilty of negligence "in designing the internal construction of the said south wing of the Capitol Extension without a due and proper regard for the safety during the erection...."

== The aftermath of the Capitol disaster ==
Despite being found guilty of negligence, Jones was allowed to continue working on the Capitol extensions, although under the supervision of W. W. Boyington. But his reputation had suffered, and the number and the scale of new projects in Madison declined. In 1885 Jones sold his Madison office to Owen J. Williams. He returned to Cambria, where he continued his design work. His post-Madison projects included buildings for the state of Wisconsin, the city of Portage, Wisconsin (Fire Engine House and Council Room), Columbia County (Register of Deeds Building, Jail and Sheriffs House, Insane Asylum, Poor House), and numerous churches and residences throughout south central Wisconsin.

In 1893 Jones was hired by William H. Jones, president of the Plano Manufacturing Company, as the principal and supervising architect for the construction of a new manufacturing plant. When completed, the factory encompassed 25 acres of land in West Pullman, Illinois, and employed 1,400 workers. Jones worked on the project from 1893 to 1905. In 1902 the Plano Manufacturing Company merged with the McCormick Harvesting Machine Company, the Deering Harvester Company, and two other companies to form the International Harvester Company.

Jones' last known building, the addition to the high school in Cambria, Wisconsin, was in 1911.

== Selected works ==
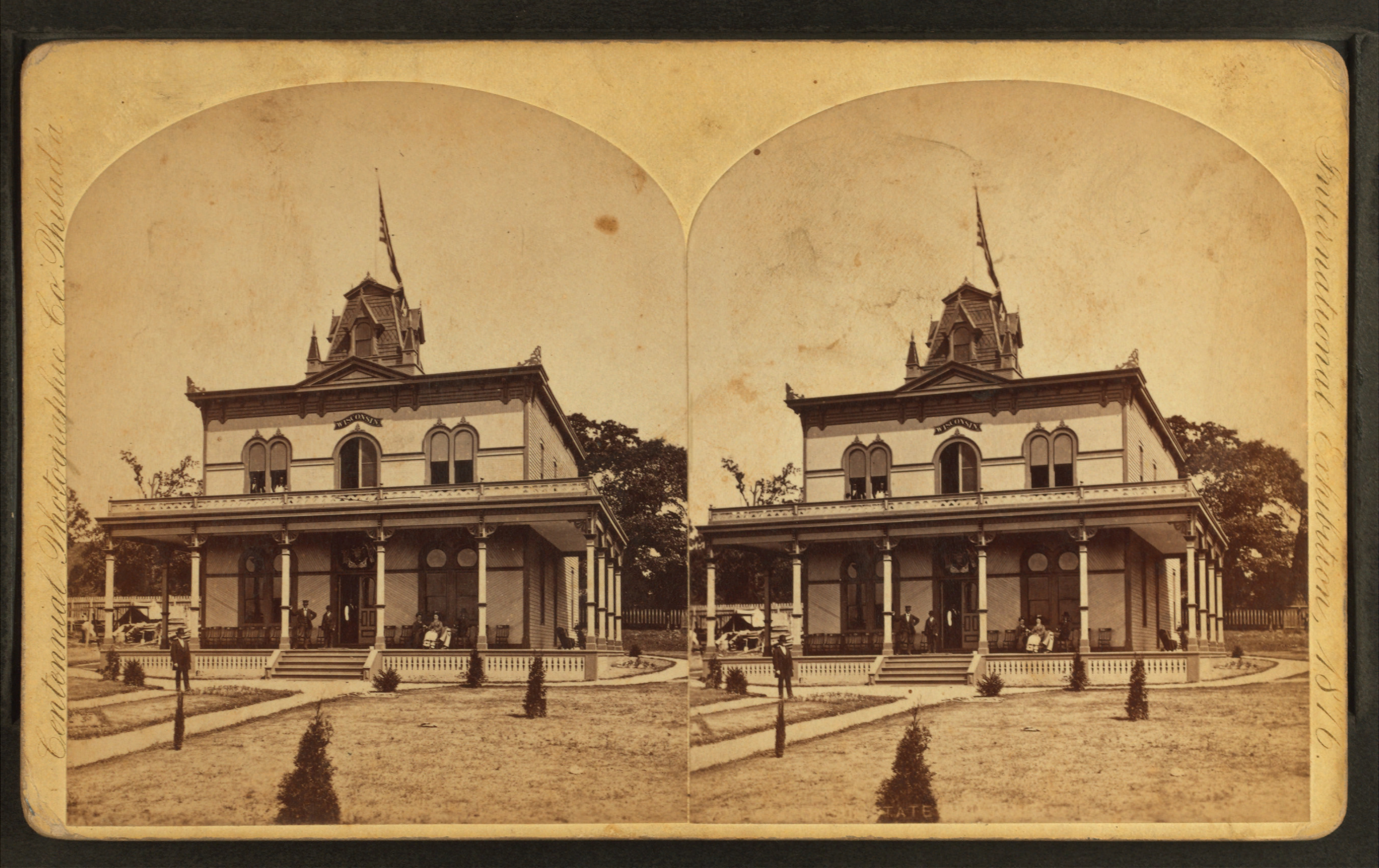
Wisconsin Building, U.S. Centennial Exhibition, Philadelphia, 1876

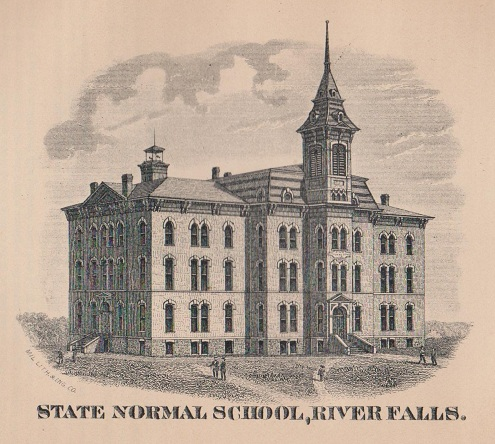
State Normal School, River Falls, Wisconsin

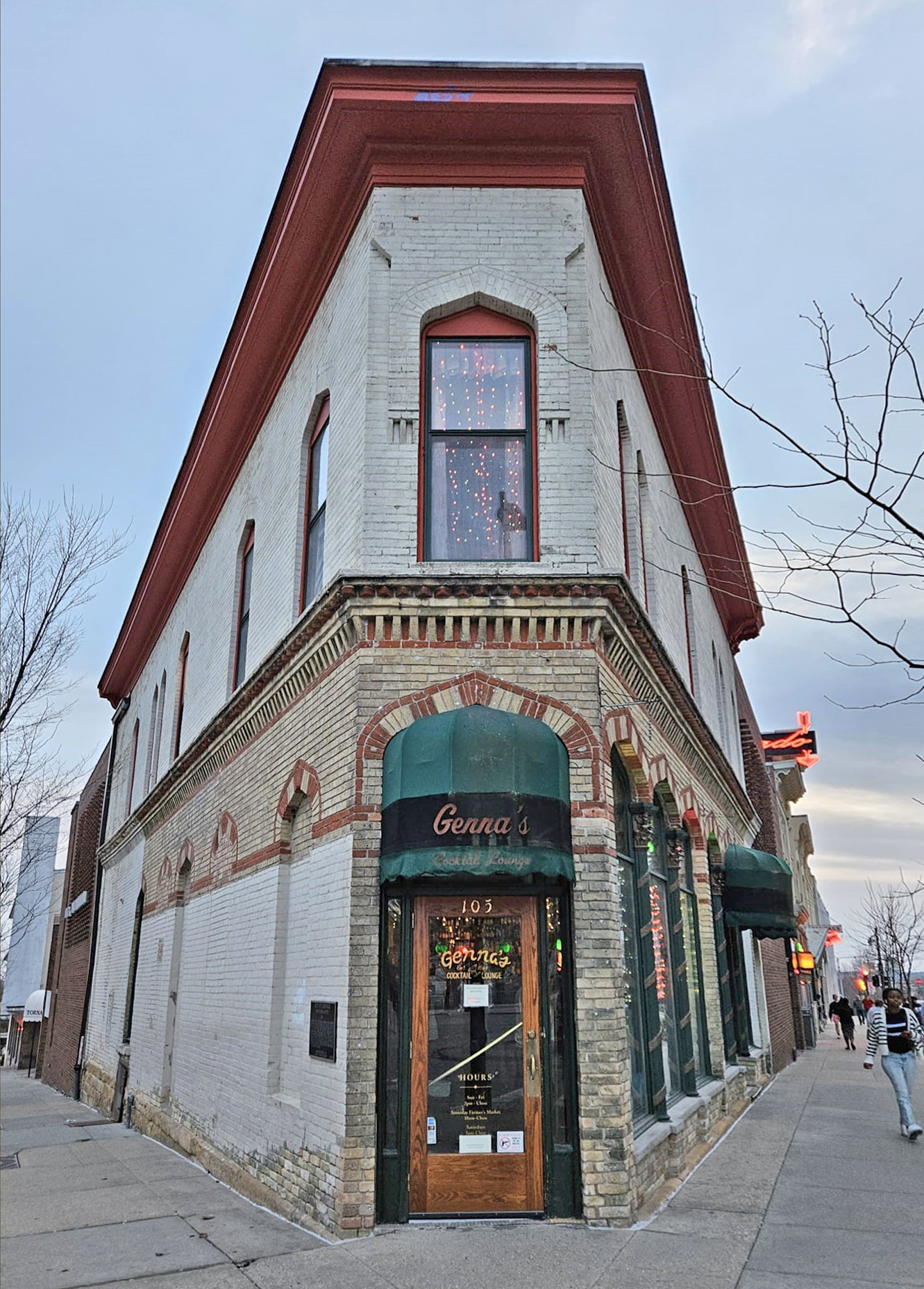
Smith and Lamb Business Block, Madison

- General David Atwood House, Madison, Wisconsin
- Washburn Observatory, 1401 Observatory Dr., Madison, Wisconsin
- Monona Lake Assembly, 1155 E. Lakeside St., Madison, Wisconsin
- Judge Romanzo Bunn House, 104 Langdon St., Madison, Wisconsin
- Assembly Hall (Music Hall), 925 Bascom Mall, University of Wisconsin-Madison, Wisconsin

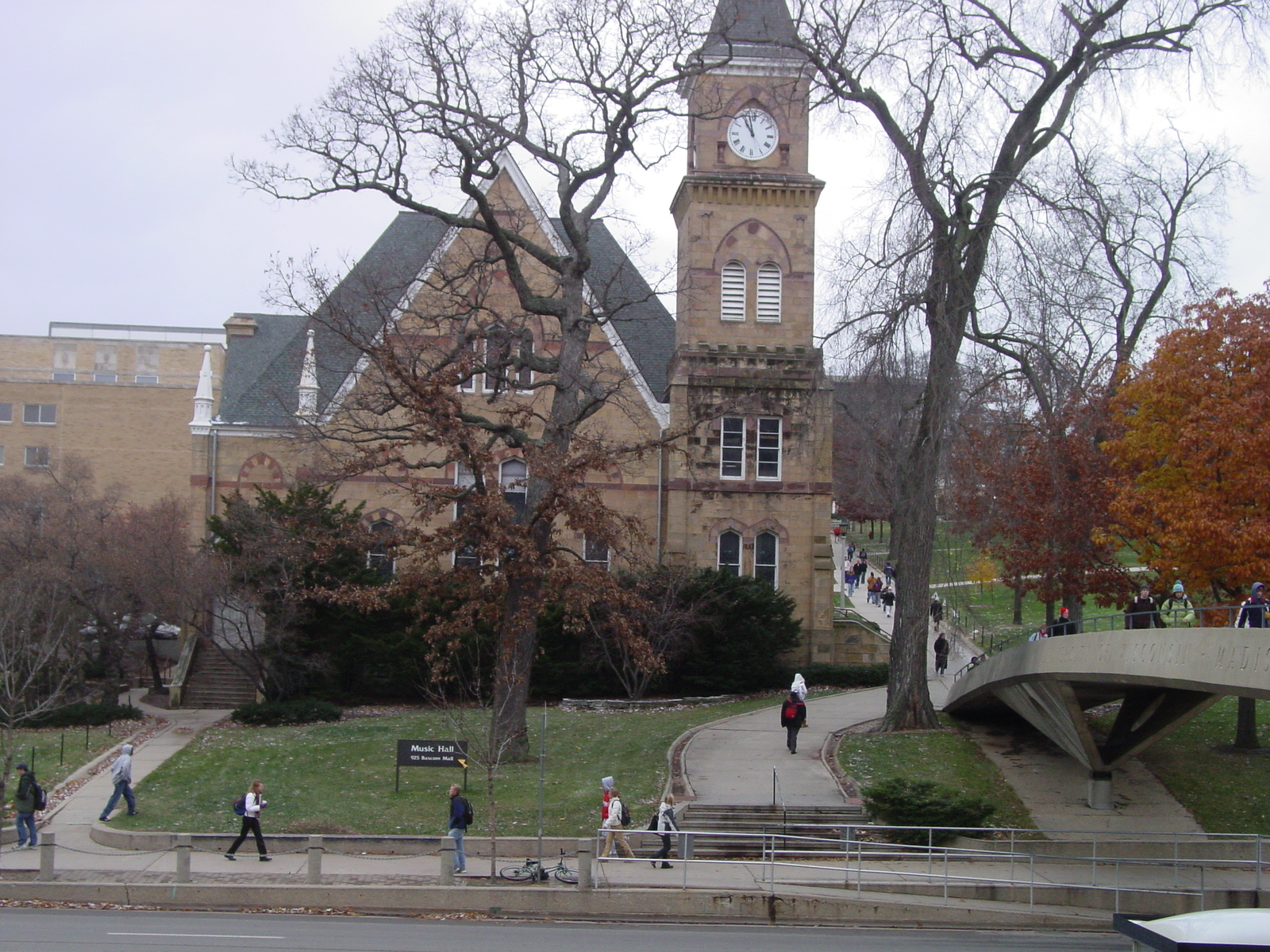
Assembly Hall, now Music Hall, Madison

- Smith and Lamb Business Block, 105 W. Main St., Madison, Wisconsin
- First Congregational Church, 103 S. Church St., Whitewater, Wisconsin

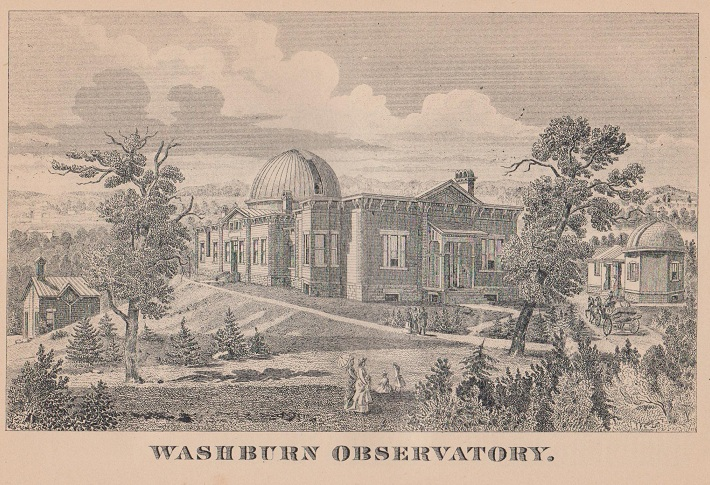
Washburn Observatory, Madison

- M. J. Rowland House, 124 W. Florence St., Cambria, Wisconsin
- George Q. Erskine House, 920 Main St, Racine, Wisconsin
- Wisconsin Building, U.S. Centennial Exhibition, Philadelphia, Pennsylvania
- Wisconsin State Capitol Extension (3rd Capitol), Madison, Wisconsin
- Magnetic Observatory, University of Wisconsin-Madison, Wisconsin
- Plano Manufacturing Company, West Pullman, Illinois
- Tonyawatha Spring Hotel, Madison, Wisconsin
- State Normal School, River Falls, Wisconsin
- H. T. Bailey Store and Opera House, 194 E. Court St., Richland Center, Wisconsin
- Warren House Hotel, Baraboo, Wisconsin
- Engine House #3, 700 6th St., Racine, Wisconsin
- Wisconsin State Hospital for the Insane, Madison, Wisconsin
- Rountree Hall Addition, 30 N. Elm St., Platteville, Wisconsin
- Grace Episcopal Church (remodeling), 116 W. Washington Ave., Madison, Wisconsin

== Poetry ==
Jones was considered a fine poet among many Welsh Americans, but because of the influence of Charles Darwin on his poetry, others found it unacceptable. He wrote poetry for the newspaper Y Drych and for local publications such as the Cambria News. Jones and his poetry were featured in the Cambrian, a magazine published in Utica, New York. Jones had two books of poetry published, Hanes Bywyd yr Hen Siôn Llwyd (1897) and Yr Ymchwil am y Goleuni (1910). His unpublished works are in a collection at Bangor University in Wales.

== Personal life ==
On October 30, 1857, Jones married Jane Williams of Welsh Prairie, Wisconsin. They had four children (Mary, Margaret, Richard, and Jane); Richard died of scarlet fever in 1865, two years after his birth. Six years later, in 1871, his wife Jane died while the family was living in St. Paul, Minnesota. Jones moved back to Wisconsin in 1873, where he married Annie Roberts of Sun Prairie, Wisconsin, on December 24, 1878.

Jones died in Cambria on February 16, 1915, at the age of 82 and is buried in the Cambria Cemetery along with his wives.
