= Courthouse Hill Historic District =

United States historic place

- U.S. National Register of Historic Places
- U.S. Historic district
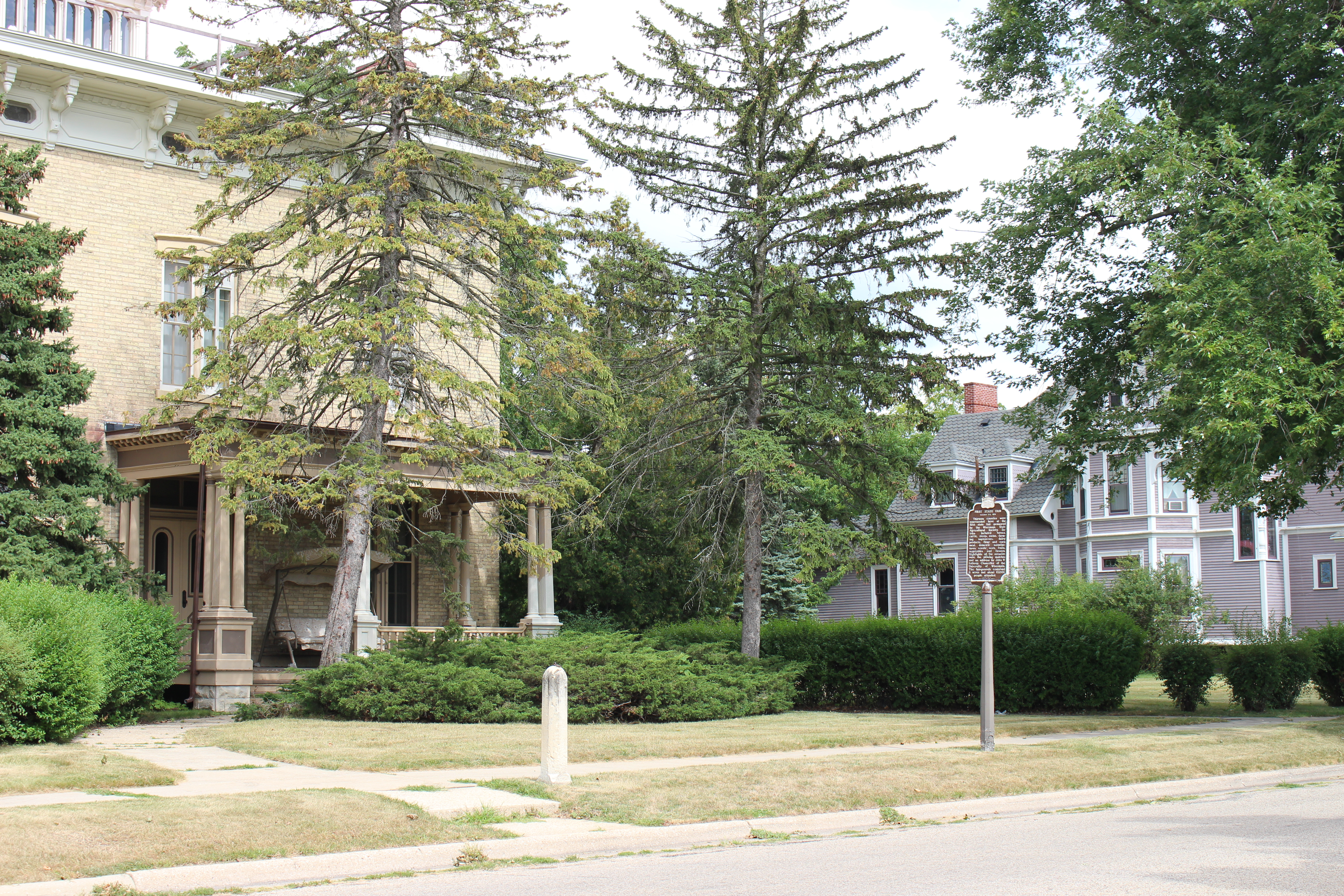
- Location: Janesville, Wisconsin
- NRHP reference No.: 86000205
- Added to NRHP: January 17, 1986

The Courthouse Hill Historic District is a 30-block area on the east side of Janesville, Wisconsin, containing many historic structures built from the mid-1800s to the early 1900s in various styles, including homes of many of Janesville's influential leaders from that period. The district was added to the National Register of Historic Places in 1986.

The first European-American settlers arrived in what would become Janesville in 1835, two years after the end of the Black Hawk War. The following year Janesville was designated the seat of Rock County. Lumber mills sprang up, and flour mills to grind the wheat produced in surrounding farmlands. In 1851 the first Wisconsin State Fair was held in the Courthouse Hill area.

People initially built smaller frame houses in what would become the district, but these were eventually replaced by larger, more substantial structures. By 1860 seven homes that still exist in the district were already there. Here are some examples of different styles, roughly in the order built.

- The Abel Jones house at 231-235 S Main St is a 2-story frame house built in the mid-1850s for Jones, a carpenter or tailor. The style is Greek Revival, seen in the massing, the frieze board, and the cornice returns.
- The Chester Alden house at 211 S Main St is a 2-story stone-clad Italianate-style house built in 1856, with an elaborate front porch, wide eaves supported by paired brackets, and tall, ornate chimneys. Alden was an early mill owner.
- The Doty-Baldwin house at 209-211 S. Atwood is a 2-story Italianate-style house with cream brick walls, paired brackets supporting wide eaves, and a low-pitched hip roof. The house was built about 1860 for grocer D.S. Treat, and later owned by Hendry A. Doty, head of the H.A. Doty Box Company. Later it was the home of A. Webster, clerk of circuit court.
- The Thomas Lappin house at 404 St Lawrence Ave is another 2-story Italianate-style house. Its massing and decoration is similar to the previous two Italianates, but this one is all wood. It was designed by Janesville architect Gary Nettleton and built in 1864 for Lappin, an Irish immigrant merchant who opened the city's first store.
- The Wheelock house at 418 St Lawrence Ave is a 3-story brick house built in 1865. Its style is Second Empire, indicated by its mansard roof - one of the few of that style in the city. The house was built for Wadsworth G. Wheelock, who established a crockery factory that was one of Janesville's largest businesses. In 1898 the house was bought by George Sutherland, a lawyer and banker.
- The Lovejoy house at 220 St Lawrence Ave is a 2.5-story house built in 1881 in Queen Anne style, displaying many features characteristic of the style: asymmetry, a complex roofline, varied surface textures, and wrap-around porches. Allen P. Lovejoy was president of Harris Machine Company, a bank director, mayor of Janesville, and a state senator.
- The Merrill house at 202 St Lawrence Ave is a 2.5-story house probably built as a brick Italianate-styled house in the mid-1800s, but then updated and expanded to a Georgian Revival-styled house around 1904. Hiram Merrill managed the New Gas Light Company of Janesville, was vice-president of Janesville Machine Company, served as mayor of Janesville, and as a state legislator.
- The Murphy/Yahn house at 823 E Milwaukee is another Queen Anne-styled house. This one, built around 1890, is wood-clad, with clapboard and patterned shingles, and a large round corner tower. A tall corbeled chimney tops the design. The residence's carriage barn survives from the same period. George W. Yahn ran a meat market on W. Milwaukee. Michael Murphy was a lawyer and city treasurer.
- The Brittan/Burpee(?) house at 314 St Lawrence Ave is a 3-story house built in 1890 in Shingle style. Features of that style seen in this house are long roof slopes, minimal eaves, and siding of wood shingles. F.C. Burpee was the city attorney. Julia Brittan is also associated with the house in some documents.
- The Barker house at 308 St Lawrence Ave is a 2-story Prairie School house designed by Hugh Mackie Garden and built in 1904, with an emphasis on the horizontal, simple geometric decoration, and a hip roof. The house was built by a founder of Cargill Inc. for his sister and her husband.
- The Malcolm Jeffris house at 502 St Lawrence Ave is a large brick-clad home built in 1906, primarily Prairie School because of the emphasis on the horizontal, but drawing columns and some other decoration from Classical Revival. Malcolm Jeffris was a lawyer, banker, and president of Janesville Electric Co. Later the house was converted to a nursing home.
- The Sutherland bungalow at 216 S Division is a 1.5-story wood-clad Craftsman bungalow built in 1911. Charles Sutherland was a physician.
- The Parker house at 904 E Court was built in 1927 - the only Spanish Colonial Revival in the Courthouse Hill district. Characteristics of the style are the stucco exterior, red tile roof, and windows with wrought-iron balconets. Russell Parker was an executive of Parker Pen Company.
- The Wheeler house at 700 St. Lawrence Ave is a 2.5-story Georgian Revival home designed by Appleton P. Clark Jr. and built in 1929, displaying the red-brick exterior, the symmetry, and the classical portico and pediment that are common to the style. William G. Wheeler was an attorney.
