= Mead Witter School of Music =

Collegiate music school at the University of Wisconsin–Madison

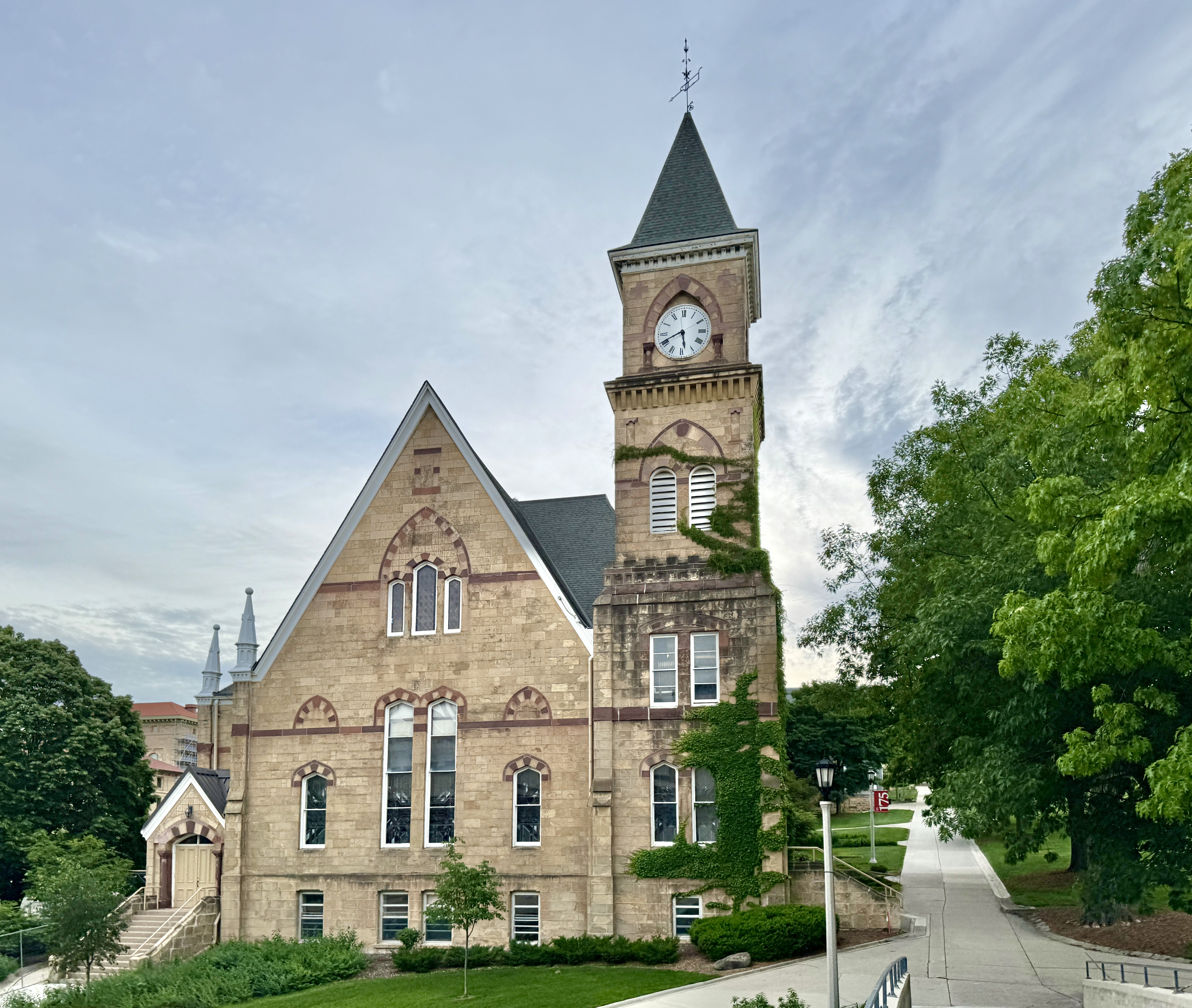
- Music Hall on Bascom Hill
- Type: Public
- Established: 1895
- Parent institution: University of Wisconsin–Madison
- Faculty: 60
- Location: Madison, Wisconsin, United States; 43°04′27.2″N 89°23′59.2″W
- Website: music.wisc.edu

The Mead Witter School of Music is the collegiate music school of the University of Wisconsin–Madison. Established in 1895, the institution consists of a 60-member faculty. Its music degree program was organized in 1915, emphasizing training for public school music teachers, and it created the first musical artist-in-residence position at any American university in 1939. The Mead Witter Foundation contributed a $25 million gift to the university in 2016 to fund a performance building, and in turn, the music school was named after the benefactor.

== Music Hall ==
Music Hall, initially named Assembly Hall, was built in 1878 in a Gothic Revival style. It was designed by architect David R. Jones of Madison to house an 800-seat auditorium, a library, and a clock tower. Dedicated on March 2, 1880, the building originally held conventions, dances, and commencement ceremonies, along with its primary purpose of a library. After the library moved to a different building on campus, a portion of the hall was assigned to the School of Music in 1900. Shortly after renovations in the early 1900s, the building was officially named Music Hall in 1910. It remains an important music venue and is home to the university opera. This building also is home to the Department of Urban and Regional Planning, with part of the building being used as office space and classrooms.

== Ensembles ==
The wind band program consists of numerous ensembles based on the musical ability of the musician. The Wind Ensemble is composed mostly of music majors, graduate and undergraduate students alike. It performs traditional and contemporary repertoire of the highest caliber, ranging from the 16th century to premier era pieces. The instrumentation of the Wind Ensemble changes in order to accommodate the requirements of the repertoire being performed. Like the Wind Ensemble, the Concert Band is composed of both music majors and non-majors, who perform standard symphonic band and chamber repertoire and orchestral transcriptions. The UW Jazz program features six ensembles, each with their own specific focus on different facets of the Jazz genre. These include the UW Afro-Cuban Jazz Ensemble and the award-winning UW Jazz Orchestra. Each ensemble performs a minimum of two concerts each semester.

== Community involvement ==
The school provides opportunities through services, programs, and activities that are held on campus. Students that are non-music majors are able to take courses with the school of music. Private lessons are offered by school through the Community Music Lessons program. The program runs under the University of Wisconsin–Madison School of Music to provide its students with experience teaching music lessons for children and adults. Lessons that are provided by undergraduate and graduate students enrolled in the School of Music are overseen by individual faculty members, a graduate coordinator, and a staff supervisor.

Music Career Services is a department located within the School of Music to provide students and graduates with career opportunities. The department offers music career advising appointments, mock interviews, auditions, and feedback on jobs. Students also have advisory opportunities with resumes and letters. Employers able to post job postings on the Music Career Services website so students and alumni are informed.
