= Lovejoy and Merrill-Nowlan Houses =

Historic houses in Wisconsin, United States

The Lovejoy and Merrill-Nowlan Houses are two large, adjacent houses built in the 1800s in the Courthouse Hill Historic District in Janesville, Wisconsin. The Lovejoy house is in a rather eclectic Queen Anne style; Merrill-Nowlan is Georgian Revival. They were separate single-family homes with independent histories until both were owned by the YWCA in the 1970s. In 1980, they were added to the National Register of Historic Places.

== Lovejoy Mansion ==
- Lovejoy Mansion
- U.S. National Register of Historic Places
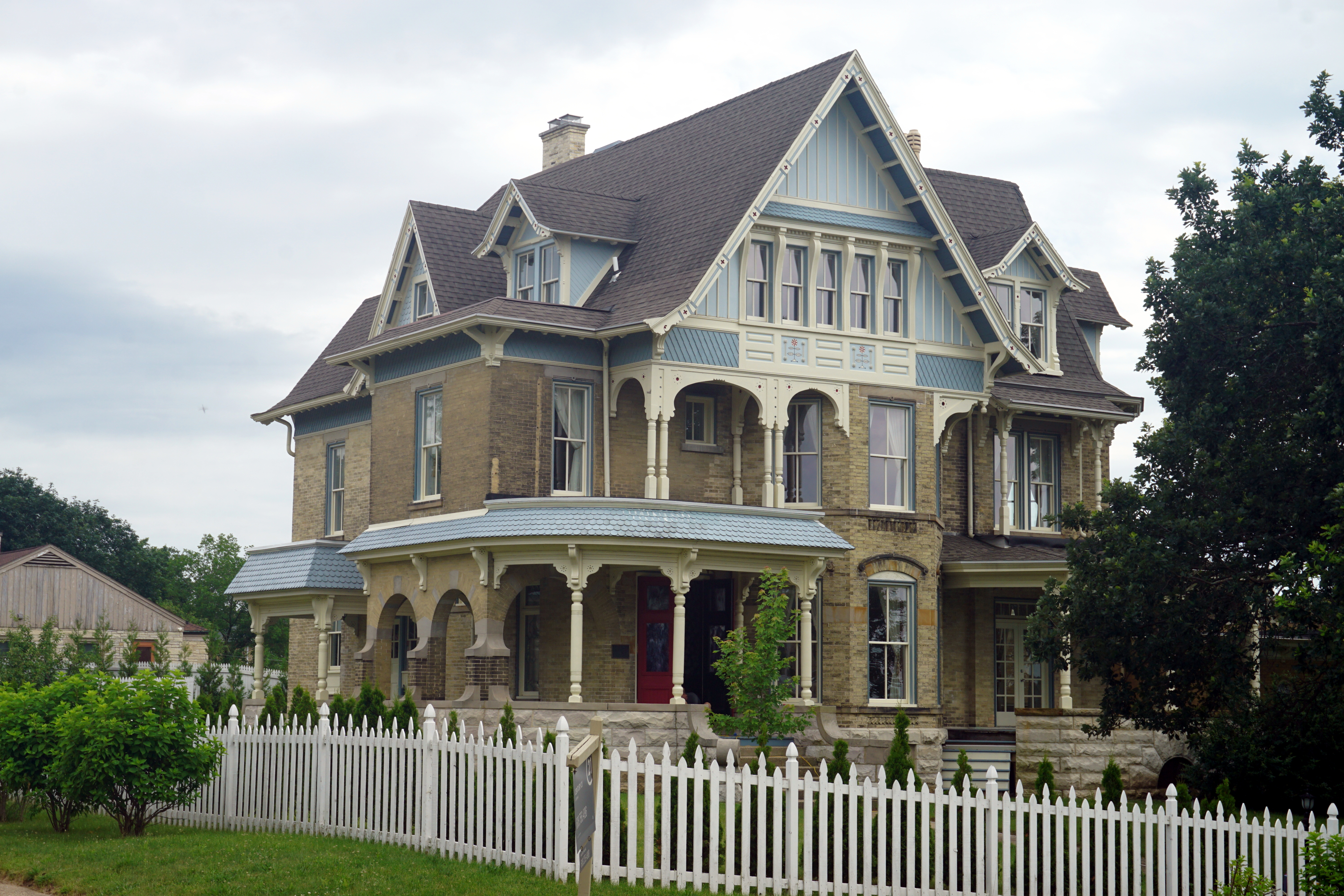
- Location: 220 St. Lawrence Ave. Janesville, Wisconsin
- Architect: James Douglas
- NRHP reference No.: 80000187
- Added to NRHP: January 21, 1980

Allen Perry Lovejoy was born in Maine in 1825 and trained as a carpenter. He came west to settle in Janesville in 1850 and started a retail lumberyard. By 1868 he had several yards and a wholesale lumber business, supplied by pine stands that he bought in northern Wisconsin, Michigan, and as far west as Oregon and California. In 1880 55-year-old Lovejoy married 30-year-old Julia Stow and bought the land where his mansion would stand. On returning from their European honeymoon, the Lovejoys lived at the Myers Hotel while their house was built. It is said that carpenter Lovejoy sat on a camp stool to monitor construction of his house.

The Lovejoy Manor was designed by Milwaukee architect James Douglas - a large 2.5-story house with various decorations in a style described as "Late Picturesque." The walls are cream brick. The roof is complex, with flared eaves and dormers of various shapes. Gable ends are trimmed with ornate bargeboards and fish-scale shingles. Surface textures are varied - clearly in the Queen Anne mold. Inside are five fireplaces and hardwood floors. The parquet floor in the nursery suggested a railroad track around the room.

Allen Lovejoy went on to be president of Janesville Machine Company, a director of the First National Bank of Janesville, a member of the Wisconsin State Assembly, the Wisconsin State Senate, and mayor of Janesville. He died in 1904. Julia founded Janesville's first kindergarten and helped start the first hospital. After Allen's death in 1904, she resided in the house until she died in 1953. After Mrs. Lovejoy's death, Joseph A. Craig bought the Lovejoy mansion in order to present it to the YWCA, whose offices remained there for the rest of the twentieth century.

== Merrill-Nowlan House ==
- Merrill-Nowlan House
- U.S. National Register of Historic Places
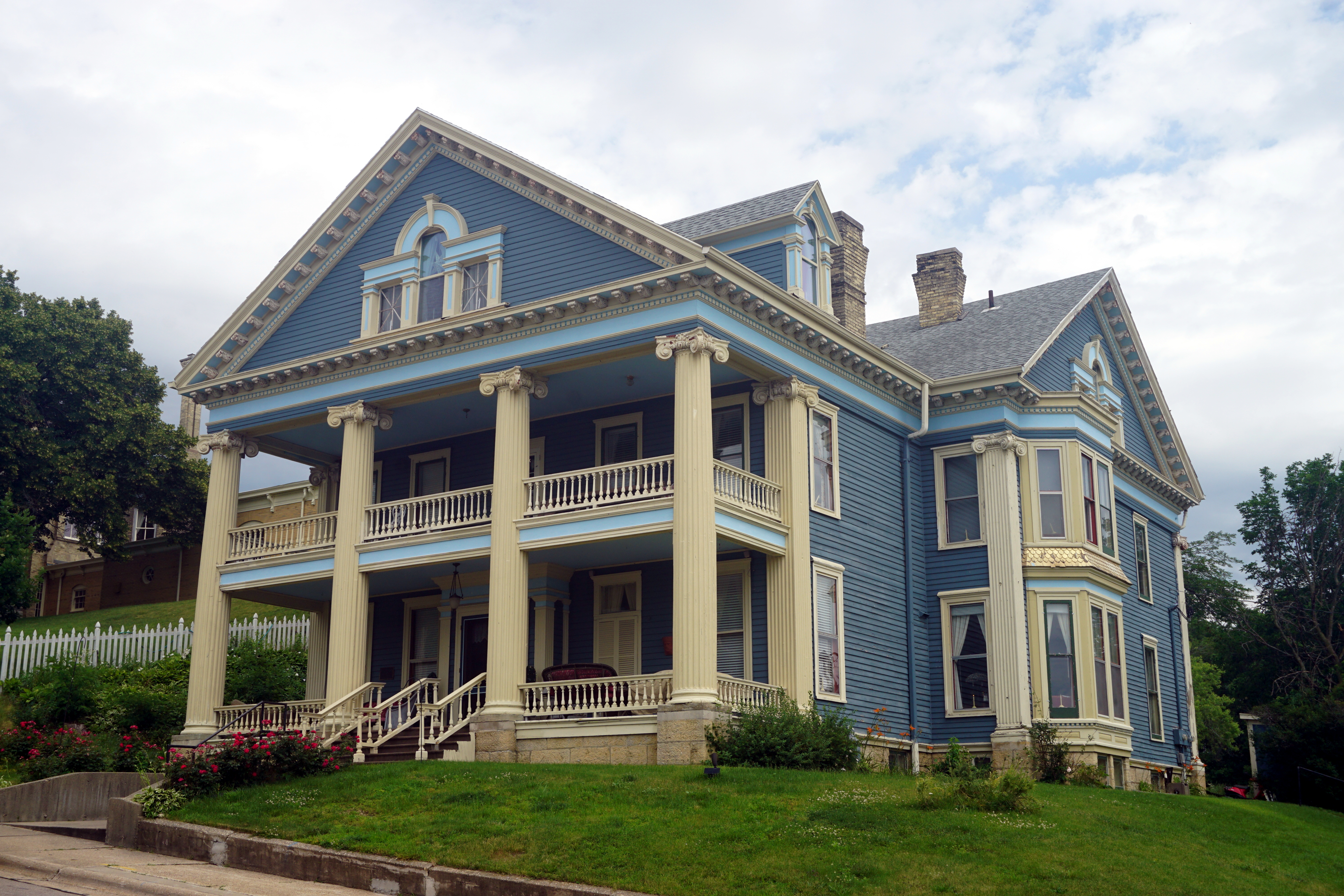

- Location within Wisconsin Location within the United States
- Interactive map showing the location of Merrill-Nowlan House
- Location: 202 St. Lawrence Ave. Janesville, Wisconsin
- Coordinates: 42°40′55″N 89°1′7″W
- Architect: George Colling
- NRHP reference No.: 80000187
- Added to NRHP: January 21, 1980

Hiram Merrill was born in 1829 in New York and came to Milwaukee in 1837. He first worked in his father's shipyard, then in 1849 headed west for the California Gold Rush, where he sold water to miners for hydraulic mining. In 1864 he came to Janesville and ran the Janesville Gas Light Company.

In 1882 Merrill and his wife bought the lot next to where Lovejoy was building his house. The lot probably contained an Italianate-styled house built in the 1850s or 1860s. The Merrills lived there for some years while Hiram became vice-president of Janesville Machine Company, mayor of Janesville, and a state assemblyman.

In 1904 the Merrills expanded the house, almost doubling its size, and updating the style from Italianate to then-more-trendy Georgian Revival style. Elements of that style are the grand portico with Ionic columns and pediment above, the corner pilasters, and the modillion trim. The inside was remodeled into two apartments - a downstairs for Hiram and Mrs. Merrill, and an upstairs for their widowed daughter Mrs. Burton Nowlan and her two children.

Hiram died in 1908. The Nolans owned the house until 1978, when it was donated to the YWCA.
