= St. Paul's Episcopal Church (Watertown, Wisconsin) =

Historic church in Wisconsin, United States

- U.S. National Register of Historic Places
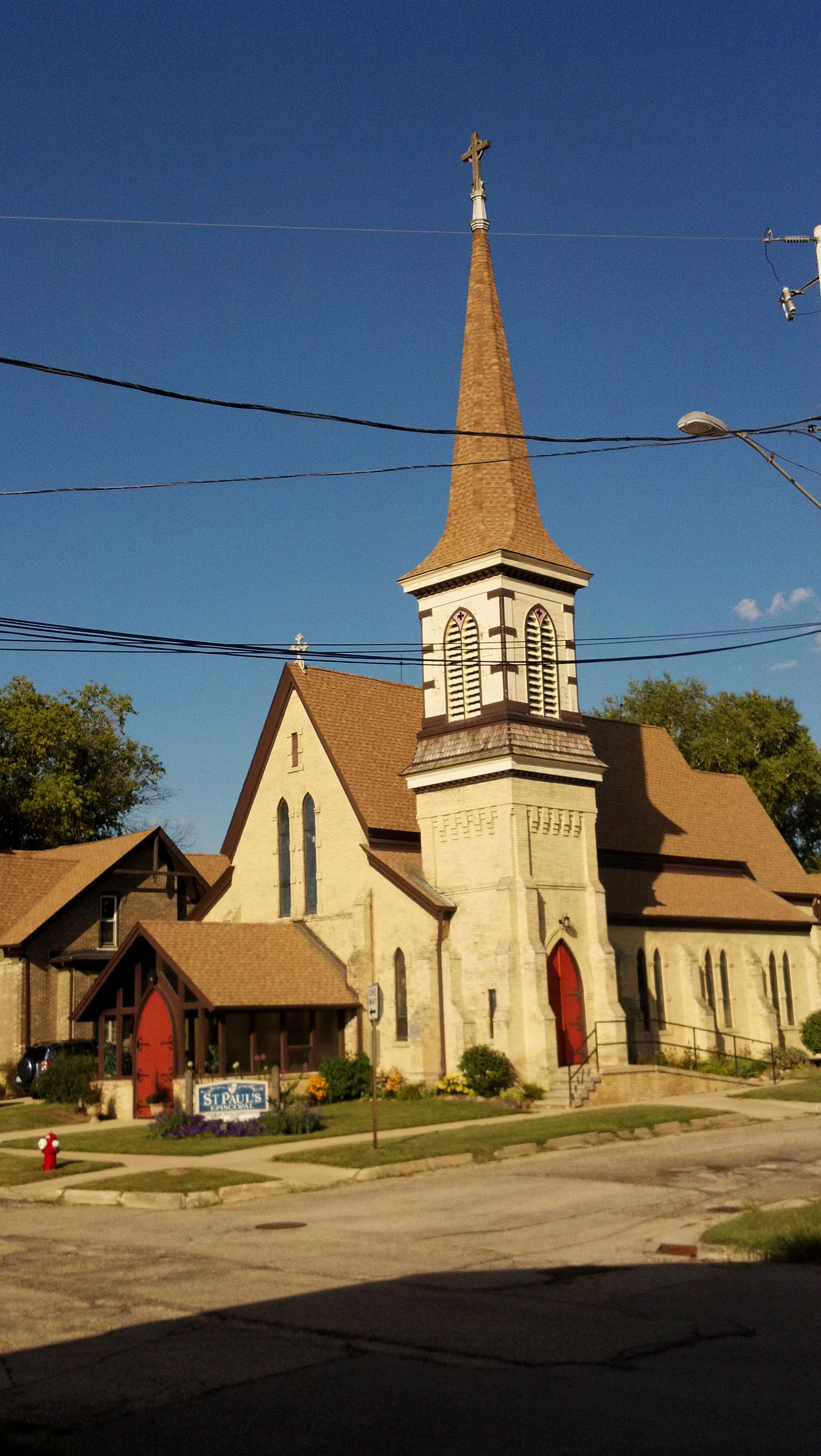

- Location within Wisconsin Location within the United States
- Location: 413 S 2nd St., Watertown, Wisconsin
- Coordinates: 43°11′29″N 88°43′24″W
- Area: 0.3 acres (0.12 ha)
- Built: 1885
- Architect: James Douglas
- Architectural style: Gothic Revival
- NRHP reference No.: 79000087
- Added to NRHP: November 7, 1979

St. Paul's Episcopal Church is a historic parish of the Episcopal Church in Watertown, Wisconsin. Its buildings display different phases of Gothic Revival architecture, and in 1979 the complex was added to the National Register of Historic Places for its architectural significance.

St. Paul's, the first Episcopal church parish in Watertown, was organized in 1847 under the guidance of Rev. Melancthon Hoyt, a missionary circuit preacher from Fox Lake who had been visiting Watertown for two years. Services were initially held in Watertown's Methodist church, but within a year the parish built its own church on Third Street between Market and Jefferson. In the following years the parish grew and became self-sufficient. By 1859 it included seventy communicants.

In 1859 the parish decided to build again. They constructed a new church building on 2nd St. - the main church hall that stands today. It was designed by James Douglas of Milwaukee in a style described in 1859 as "modern Gothic style." We now consider the nave rather quaint Gothic Revival, marked by the steep roofs, lancet windows, and simple decoration. It is sixty feet long plus an 18-foot recess chancel, and 38 feet wide including buttresses. The walls are of Watertown cream brick from D.S. Chadwick's brickyard. Inside, the walls and ceiling are plastered, with wood wainscoting on the walls. The masons were John and James Ford, and the builders were Samuel Vaux and William Honey.

In 1885 a rectory was added, with cream brick walls in two colors, tall windows and doors, and steeply pitched cross-gabled roofs. Its style is Gothic Revival too, but in a flavor quite different from the graceful nave.

In 1886 a chapel was added connecting to the church. It is brick, with lancet windows and buttresses like the church, but with less emphasis on the vertical. The roof is less steep and a round window is in the wall above the entrance.

In 1890 over a side entrance they built a large square tower with a tall octagonal spire topped with a cross. In contrast to the simple, graceful 1859 nave, the new multi-colored tower was in High Victorian Gothic style, more ornate, heavy and solid.

From 1890 to 1909 the original stained glass windows in the church were replaced with windows made by the Milwaukee Art Glass Company.

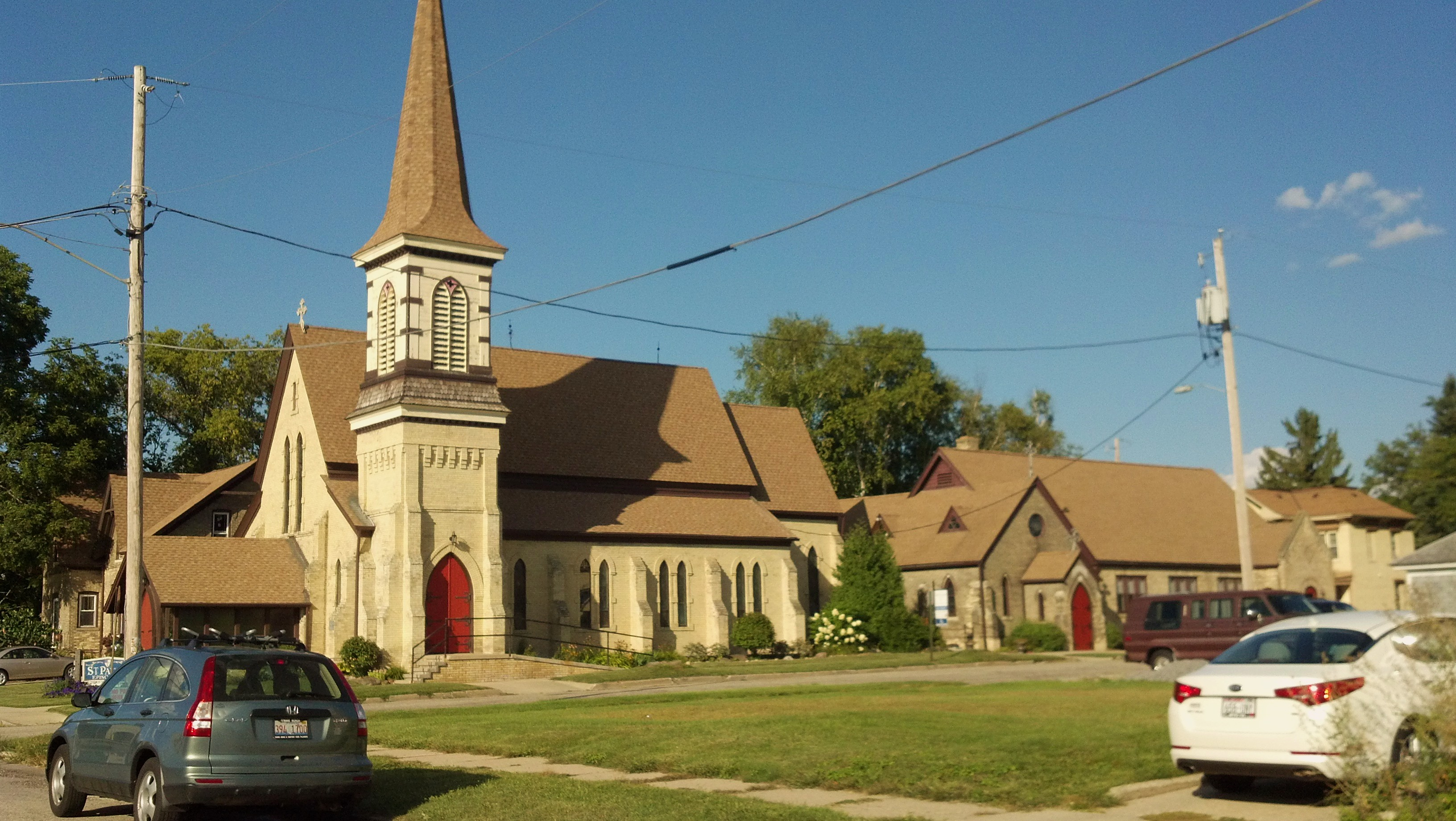
Another view of the church

In 1931 a gable-roofed guild hall was added, of brick to match the other buildings, and perhaps a hint of Gothic style, but with round-arched, segmental-arched windows and rectangular windows.

Today St. Paul's is one of the oldest church buildings still in use in Watertown. The NRHP considers the church complex architecturally significant, illustrating how Gothic architecture changed over time.
