= James Douglas (architect) =

American architect

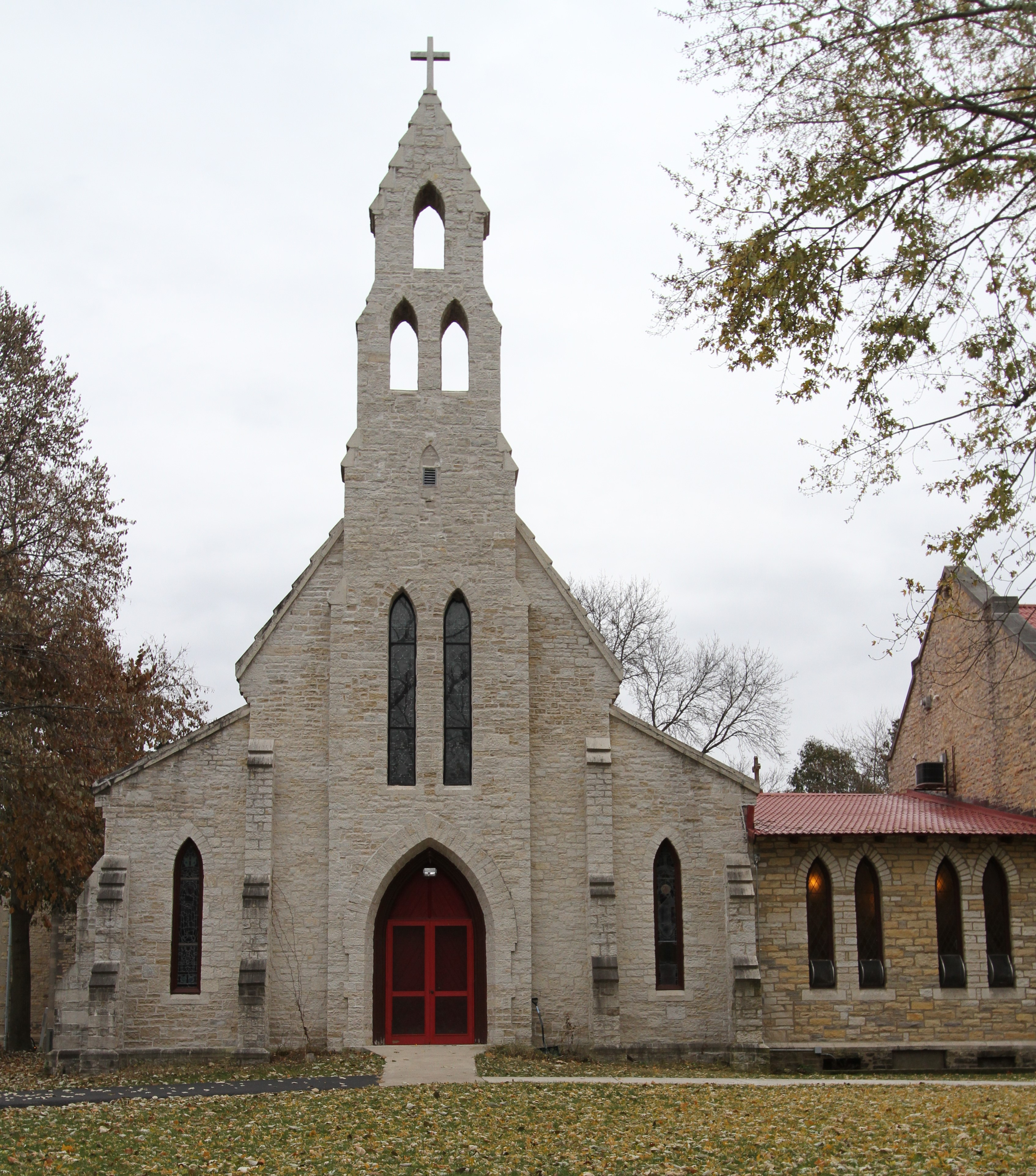
The Chapel of St. Mary the Virgin at Nashotah House

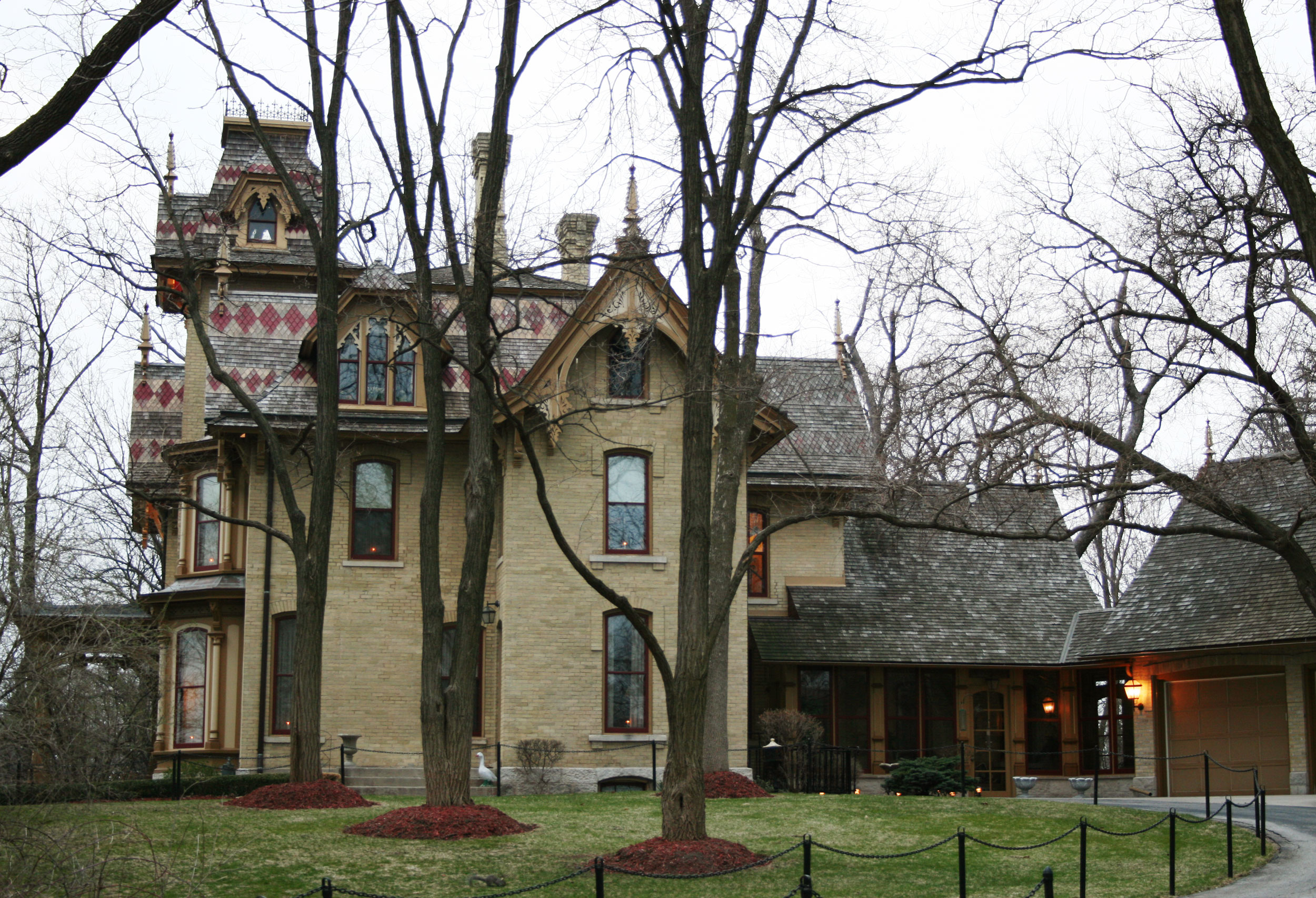
Sunnyhill Home

James O. Douglas (1823 – unknown) was an American architect in Wisconsin. He has been called a "noted Milwaukee society architect".

Douglas was born in 1823 in Scotland, emigrated to Canada in 1840, and came to Milwaukee in 1843. In Milwaukee he worked as a "carpenter and master workman," working on the old city hall, St. Gall's Church, St. John's Cathedral, and Holy Trinity Roman Catholic Church (Milwaukee, Wisconsin). He reportedly helped build Milwaukee's first bridge, c.1840, over the Milwaukee River.

In 1847 he and his brother started a design and construction partnership. By 1859, "James and Alexander Douglas, Architects & Builders, [were] located on Oregon Street, between Grove [S. 5th] and Monroe [S. 6th] streets." In 1863 he left that business to work for Northwestern Life Insurance. In 1872 he returned to architecture.

Historian Alexander Carl Guth calls Douglas "a very emotional man, likewise...very pompous and always on his dignity, both in manner and dress," and relates an anecdote in which "a stranger came to [Douglas'] office looking for a prominent architect by the name of [Henry C.] Koch. Douglas straightaway disclaimed all knowledge of such a man and informed the stranger that he was now standing in the presence of the most eminent architect of the day and that he had better take due heed of same. It is needless to say that this stranger was none other than a prospective client for Koch, but Douglas made such an impression on the man that he rightway [sic] engaged him as his architect."

A number of his works are listed on the U.S. National Register of Historic Places. One, Sunnyhill Home, is further designated a U.S. National Historic Landmark.

Works include (attribution):

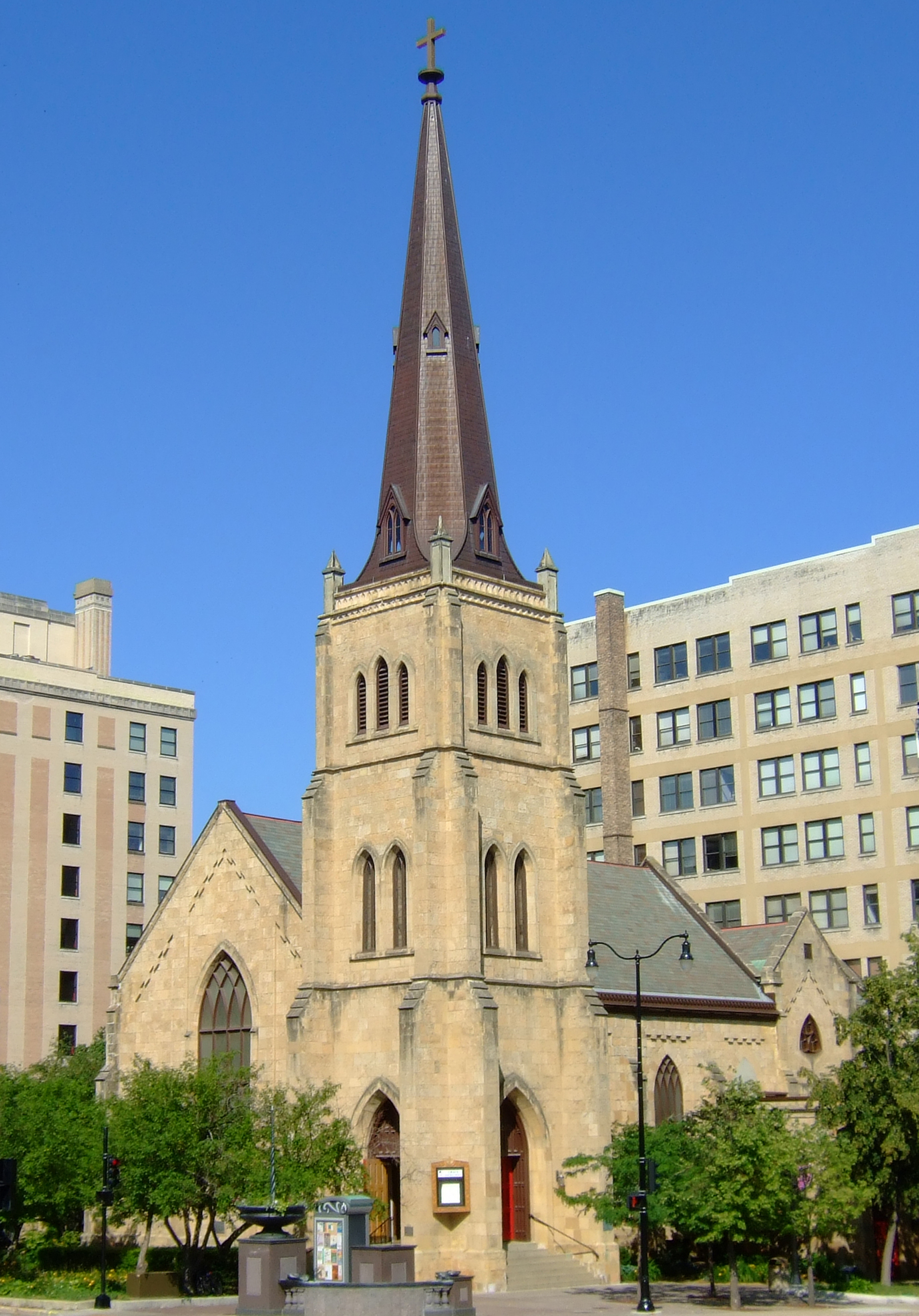
1855, Grace Episcopal Church, Madison

- Grace Episcopal Church (built 1855-1858), 6 N. Carroll St., Madison, WI, NRHP-listed
- St. Paul's Episcopal Church (built 1859), 413 S. 2nd St., Watertown, WI, NRHP-listed
- Chapel of St. Mary the Virgin (built 1866), 2 mi. SW of Nashotah on Nashotah House Rd. Nashotah, WI, NRHP-listed
- Sunnyhill Home (built 1874), also known as Dr. Fisk Holbrook Day House, 8000 W. Milwaukee Ave., Wauwatosa, WI, NRHP-listed
- Elias A. Calkins Doublehouse (built 1875), 1612-1614 E. Kane Pl., Milwaukee, WI, NRHP-listed
- Harry B. Walker House (built ca. 1878), 3130 W. Wells St., Milwaukee, WI
- Lovejoy House (built c.1880s), 220 St. Lawrence Ave., Janesville, WI, NRHP-listed
- Stack Flats (built 1881 or 1883, razed 1967), 803-5 W. Wisconsin Ave., Milwaukee, WI
- Sanford R. Kane House (built 1883), 1841 N. Prospect Ave., Milwaukee, WI, NRHP-listed
- T.B. Scott Mansion (built 1888), 601 S. Center Ave., Merrill, WI
- Charles Quarles House (built 1891), 2531 N. Farwell Ave., Milwaukee, WI, NRHP-listed
- Kane Apartments (built 1896), 1503, 1509, & 1515 E. Kane Pl., Milwaukee, WI
- William J. Turner House (built 1887), 743 N. 25th St., Milwaukee, WI
- One or more works in Merrill, WI's Center Avenue Historic District, Roughly bounded by Cedar, Park, Third, Center and Seventh Sts., NRHP-listed
