= Evan O. Jones =

American politician

Evan O. Jones (March 24, 1830 – April 28, 1915) was a member of the Wisconsin State Assembly and the Wisconsin State Senate.

== Biography ==
Jones was born in Denbighshire, Wales. In January 1857, he married Mary Ann Roberts. They had three children. Evan O. Jones was the brother of architect David R. Jones.

== Career ==
Jones was a member of the Assembly from 1866 to 1867 and of the Senate from 1873 to 1874. Additionally, he was Chairman of Supervisors, Clerk and President of Cambria, Wisconsin and a justice of the peace. He was a Republican.

He died in his home in Cambria after a lengthy illness.
