= Grace Episcopal Church (Madison, Wisconsin) =

Historic church in Wisconsin, United States

- U.S. National Register of Historic Places
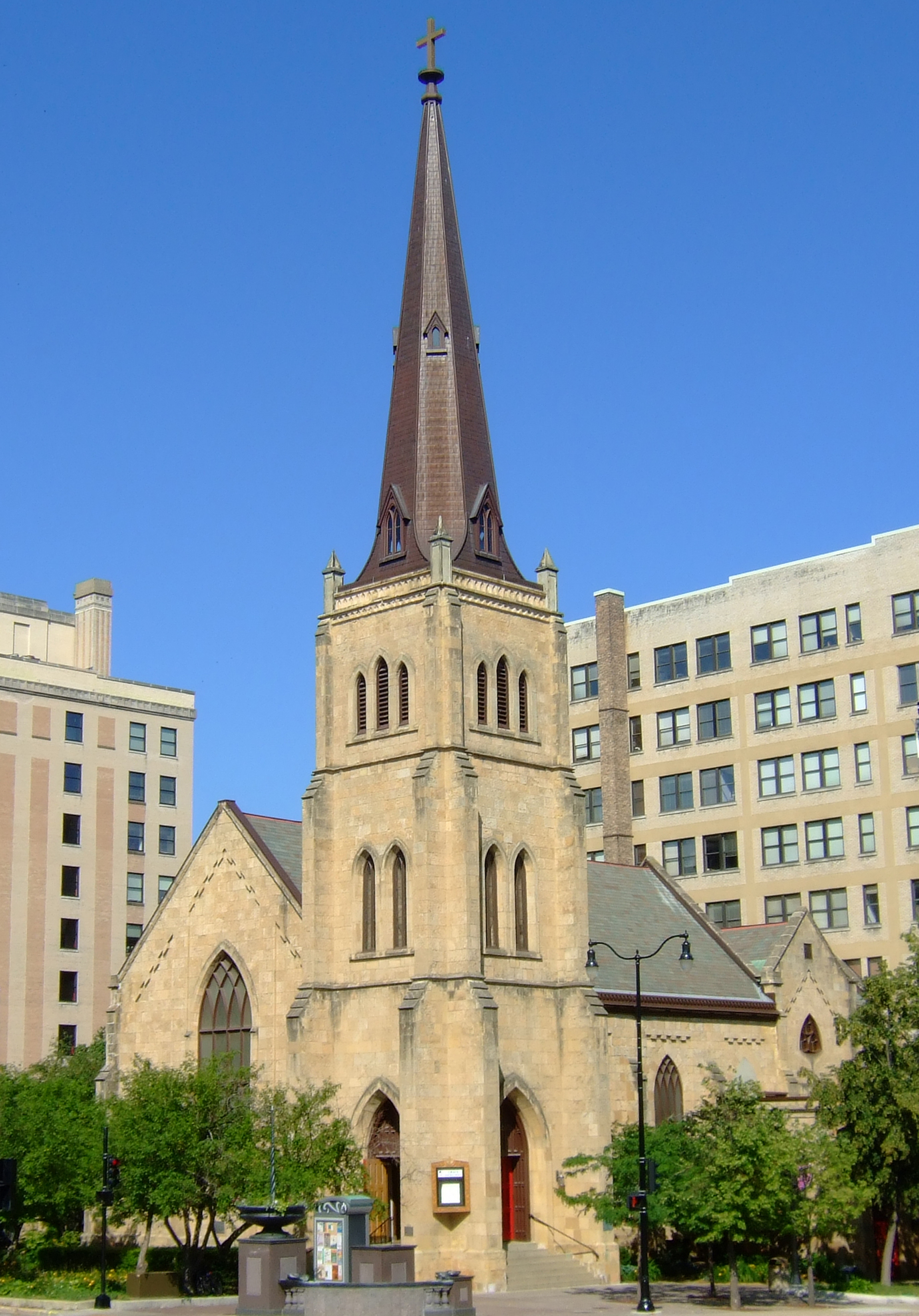

- Location within Wisconsin Location within the United States
- Location: 6 North Carroll Street, Madison, Wisconsin
- Coordinates: 43°4′26″N 89°23′8″W
- Area: less than one acre
- Built: 1858
- Architect: James Douglas
- Architectural style: Gothic Revival
- NRHP reference No.: 76000055
- Added to NRHP: January 1, 1976

Grace Episcopal Church is a Gothic Revival-style church started in 1855 on Capitol Square in Madison, Wisconsin by the oldest congregation in the city. In 1976 the building was added to the National Register of Historic Places.

In 2024, the church reported average Sunday attendance (ASA) of 111 persons and plate and pledge income of $454,340. In 2015 it reported 452 members; the most recent membership statistics were 396 persons in 2023.

== History ==
In July 1838, when Wisconsin was still a territory and Madison was not yet incorporated as a village, while workers were building the first territorial capitol, Episcopal Bishop Jackson Kemper visited the new community and helped initiate worship services in a "roughly built storefront." In 1846 that congregation formally organized as Grace Church.

In 1855 the new congregation began constructing the building shown in the photo on the west side of the capitol square. They had hired architect James Douglas of Milwaukee, who designed a Gothic Revival-style structure much as you see it today. Its walls were clad in blocks of cream-colored sandstone, with the masonry work supervised by James Livesay. The openings had pointed-arches - one of the hallmarks of Gothic Revival. The main entrance was through a large square corner tower with corner buttresses, rising three stages to an octagonal wooden spire, topped with a cross. The main building and tower were completed in 1858 and in February of that year, worship began in the building.

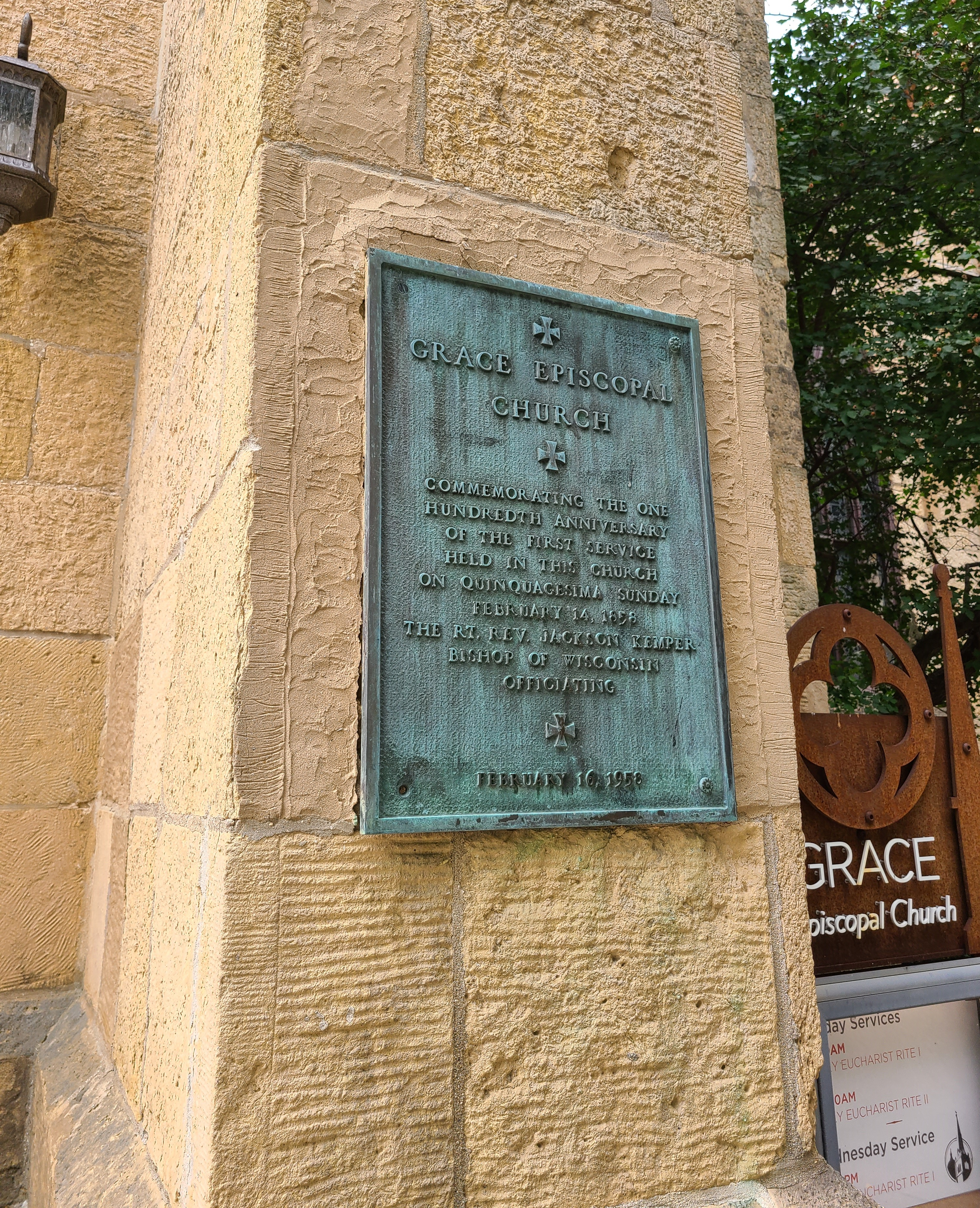
Plaque outside of Grace Episcopal Church

But construction continued, little by little. In 1868 the basement was finished. The spire was added on the tower in 1870. The congregation found the building hard to heat due to the original high ceiling, so in 1885 they inserted a lower ceiling with hammerbeam trusses decorated with quatrefoils and a pointed arch, designed by David R. Jones and Burling & Whitehouse of Chicago. Stained glass windows were added one by one:

- 1887 – the Resurrection Window, made in England, was the first one.
- 1899 – the Baptistry Window, made by Tiffany's of New York.
- 1898-99 – the "West window" was given by the Sunday school children, with new glass added in 1958.
- 1925 – other windows were installed, designed by Conrad Schmitt Studios of Milwaukee and made in Munich, Germany.

A second bay window was added in the 1920s and a chapel was added along Carroll Street.

In 1976 the church was added to the National Register of Historic Places for its significance in art, architecture and religion. The nomination summarized:

The architectural dignity which characterizes this church is due partly to Douglas' skillful arrangement of its forms, and to the beauty of the memorial windows, where color design and symbolism form an integral part of the total composition. Since 1855 Grace Church has been a center of life in Madison, both for worship and recreation. Its architectural significance and the history of the parish form a significant part of the history of Wisconsin.

== Gallery ==
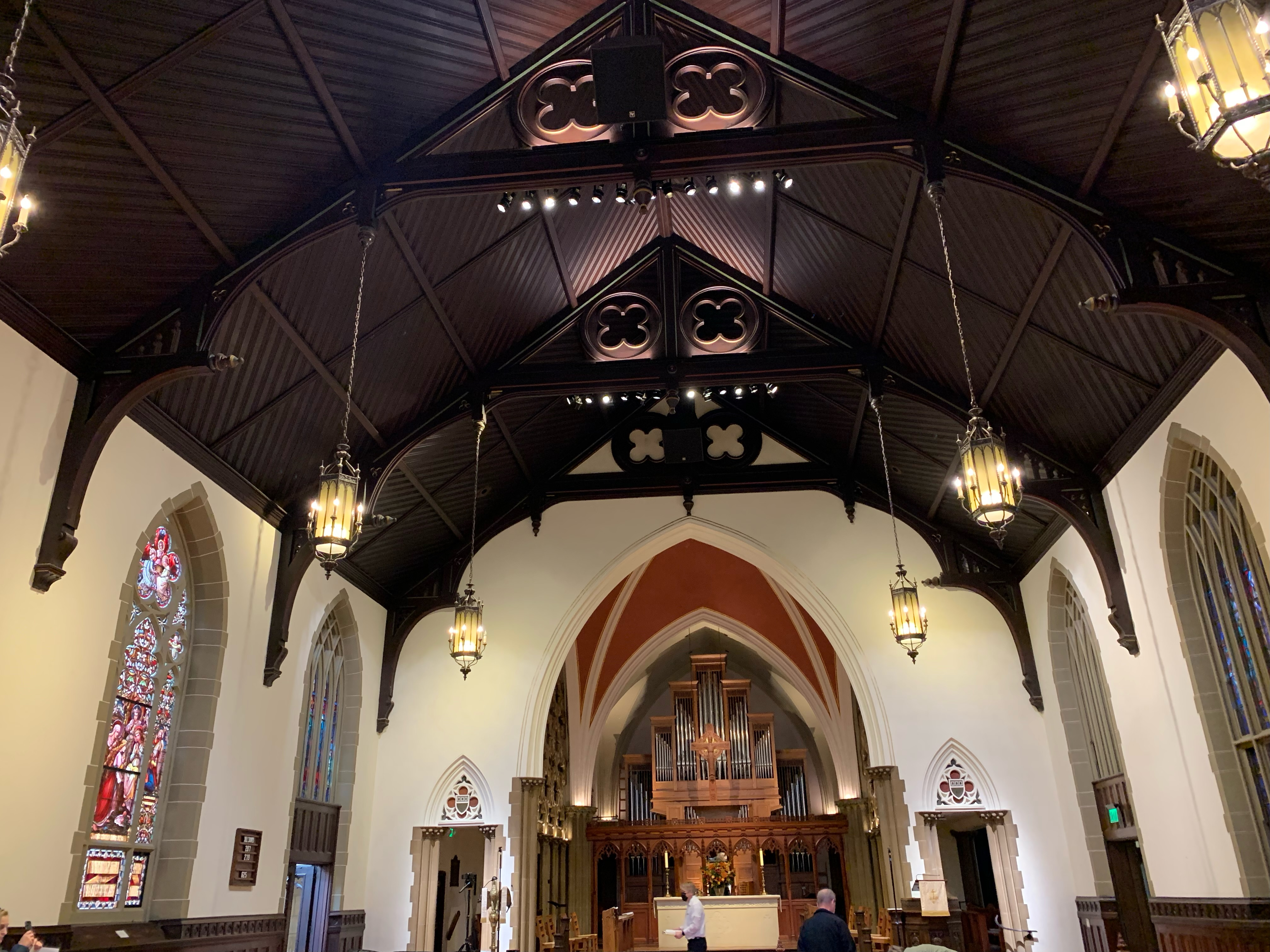
Interior

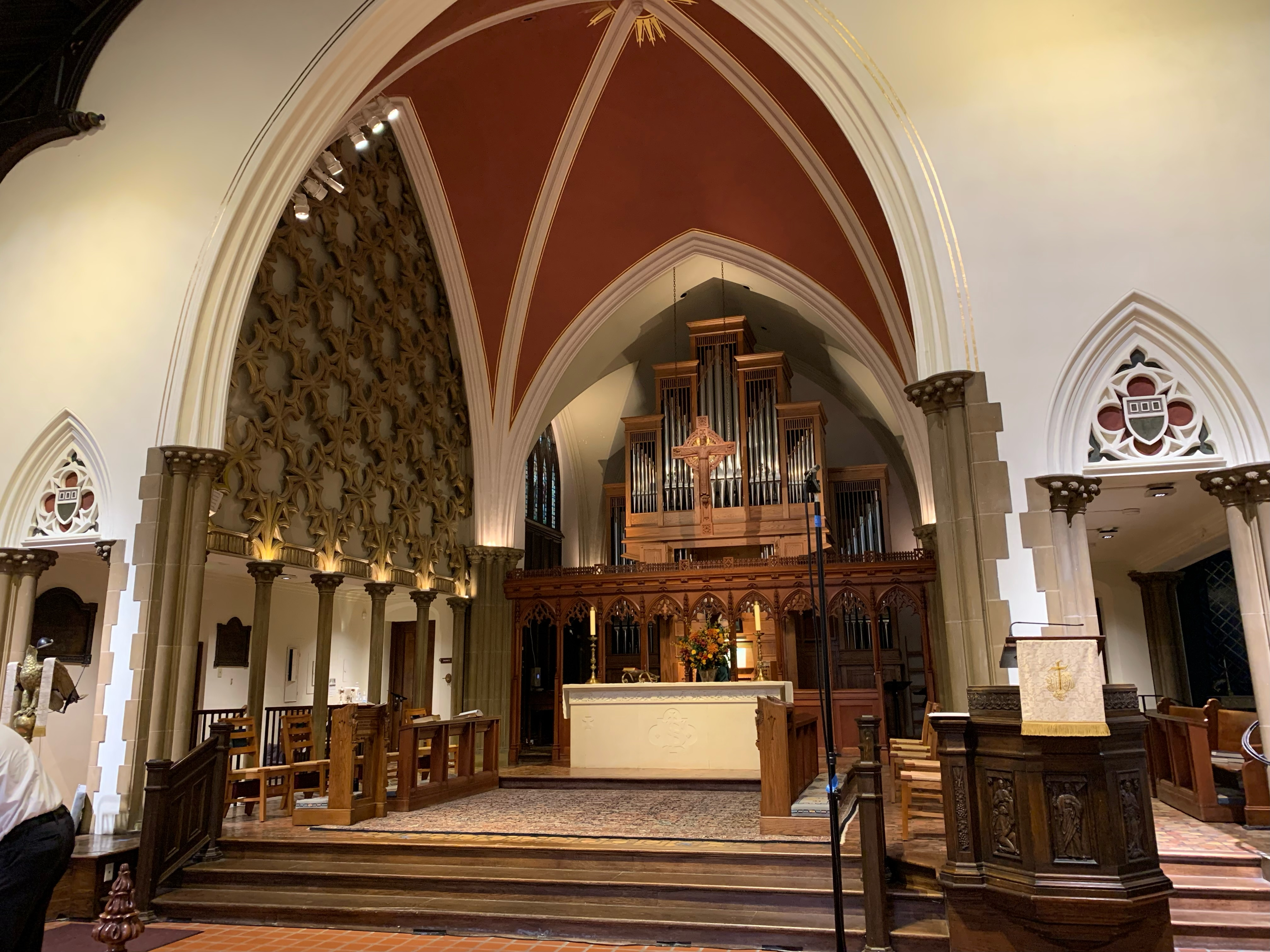
Sanctuary

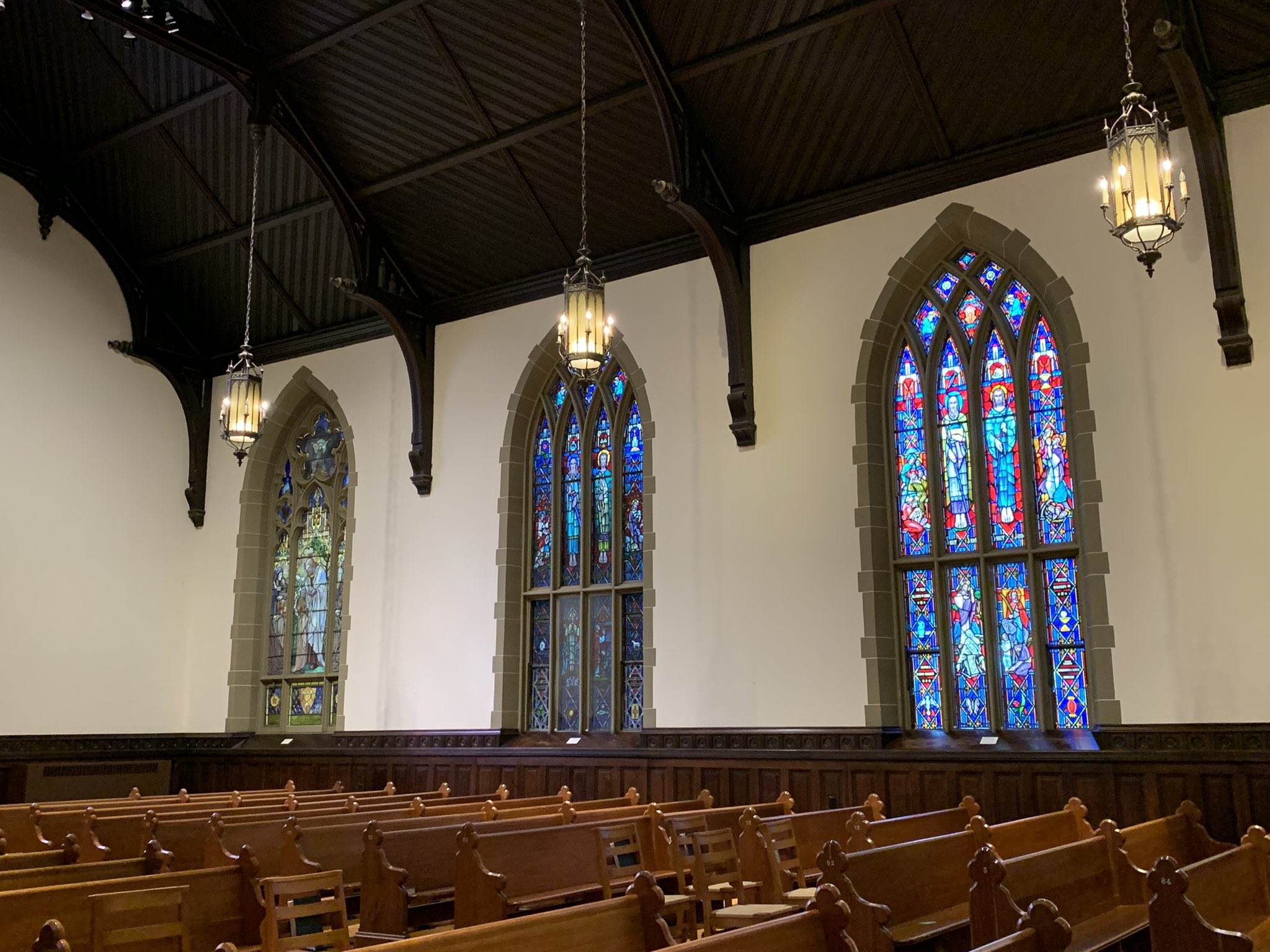
Windows

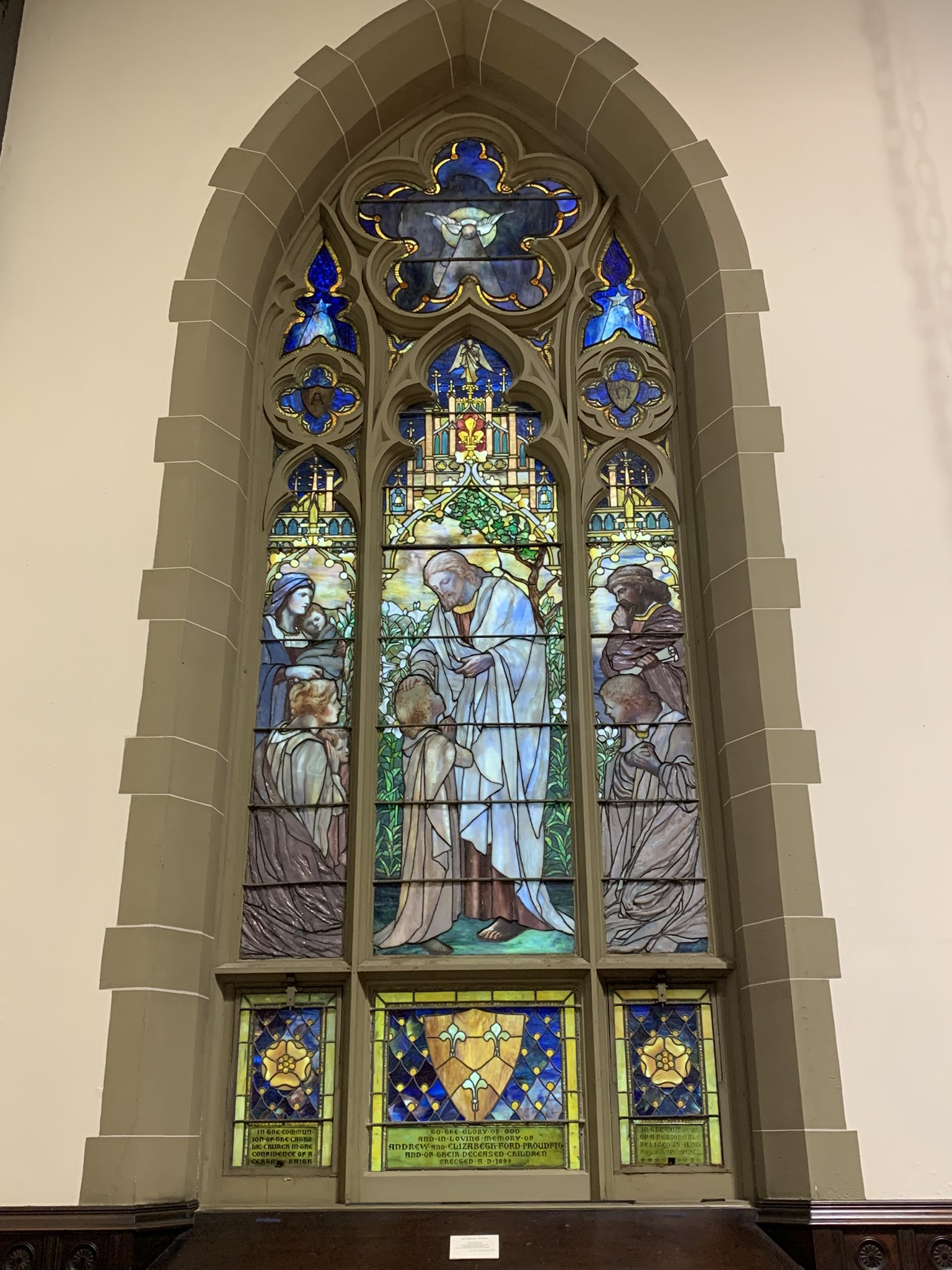
Tiffany window
