= Cambria, Wisconsin =

- Village
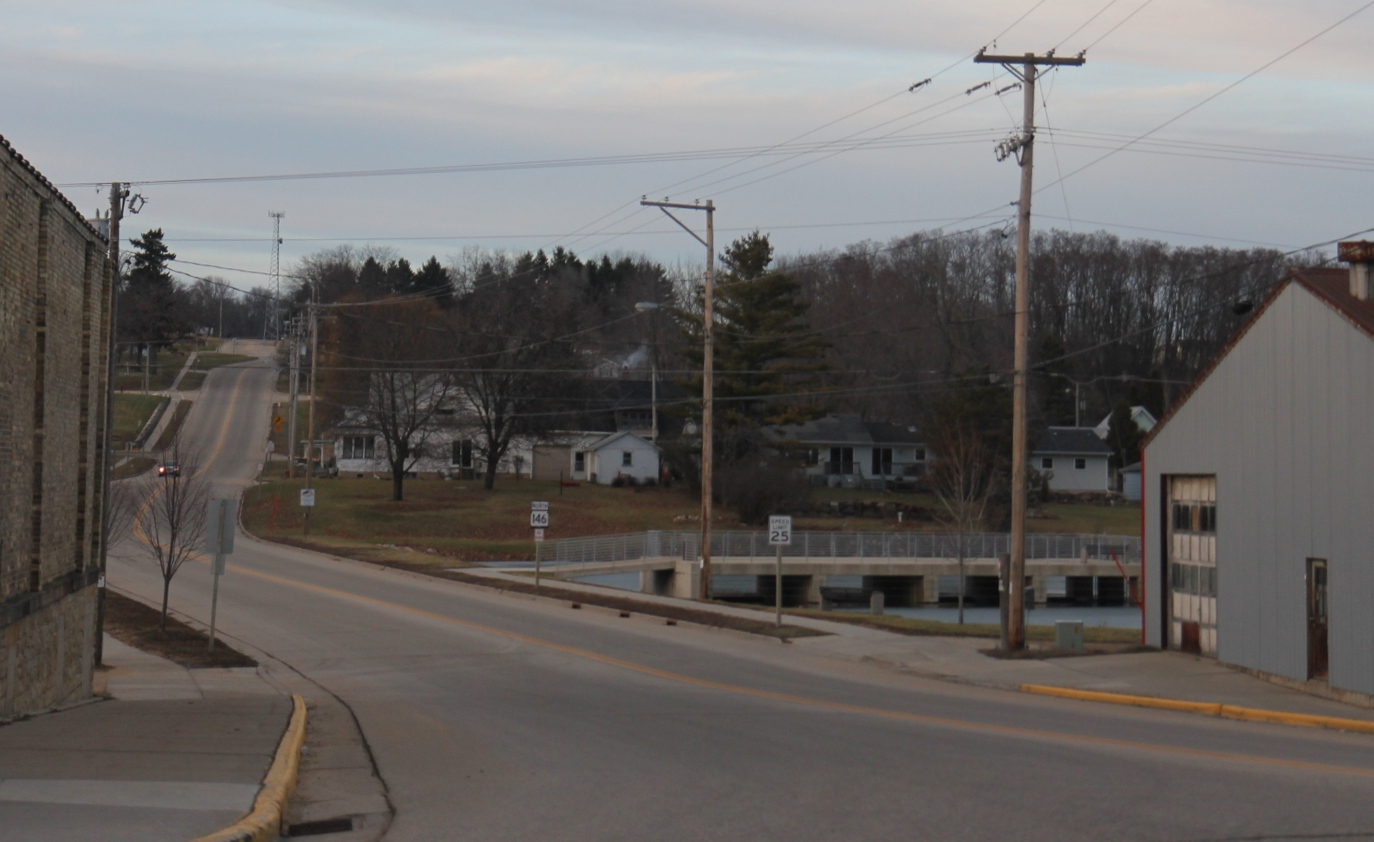
- Looking north up WIS 146 in Cambria
- Motto: "A Growing Community"
- Location of Cambria in Columbia County, Wisconsin
- Coordinates: 43°32′34″N 89°6′36″W
- Country: United States
- State: Wisconsin
- County: Columbia

Area
  - Total: 1.03 sq mi (2.67 km^{2})
  - Land: 0.98 sq mi (2.54 km^{2})
  - Water: 0.050 sq mi (0.13 km^{2})
- Elevation: 915 ft (279 m)

Population (2020)
  - Total: 777
  - Estimate (2024): 768
  - Density: 763/sq mi (294.6/km^{2})
- Time zone: UTC-6 (Central (CST))
  - Summer (DST): UTC-5 (CDT)
- Area code: 920
- FIPS code: 55-12200
- GNIS feature ID: 1562559
- Website: Village of Cambria

Cambria is a village in Columbia County, Wisconsin, United States. The population was 777 at the 2020 census, 767 at the 2010 census. It is part of the Madison Metropolitan Statistical Area.

== History ==
In 1844, two brothers, John and Samuel Langdon, settled on the site. Samuel P. Langdon built a sawmill on a branch of Duck Creek, the other opened a small stock of merchandise. They surveyed and platted four blocks, and called the village Florence. But the mill dominated the landscape in those days, and the settlement around it was called Langdon's Mills.

The settlement had just begun when about fifty Welshmen, with their wives and children, came from North Wales, many from Dolwyddelan. Morris J. Rowlands, a son of one of the colonists, wrote in 1912,

Early in the summer of 1845 several families from North Wales met accidentally at Liverpool, England, seeking passage as immigrants to the United States of America. On the 17th day of July they sailed from Liverpool harbor on board a sailing vessel named the Republic, and after a voyage of six weeks and two days arrived safely in New York City on the 30th of August, 1845....

After arriving in New York, a number of families whose male members were quarrymen in the old country, went to the slate quarries of New York and Vermont, but the majority of them turned their faces 'Westward,' a word taken as their motto before leaving their native land.

The next portion of the journey from New York to Albany was made on a steamboat. From Buffalo they took passage over the lakes on board of a steamboat named Wisconsin, the name possibly being the means of drawing them to that particular boat; for that state was their 'promised land.' After a stormy voyage on the lakes they arrived at Milwaukee, Wisconsin, on the 16th day of September, where a portion of them landed, and on the 17th at Racine, where the remainder left the boat.

On the 24th of September, having previously agreed upon them, Robert Closs, David D. Roberts, John R. Rowlands Sr., Evan Edwards and Jabez Lloyd left their families at the places mentioned, and were joined by E. B. Williams, William R. Williams, John O. Jones and John Edwards (single men). The party then started on foot in search of a suitable place on which to locate, traveling westward over the eastern part of the state, and passing through the village of Fox Lake, where a branch land office was located.... They entered into Columbia, then called Portage County, about four miles north of the present site of the village of Randolph, arriving foot-sore and weary on Saturday evening, September 27th....

...[T]hey continued their westward course until they came to a point on the Fox River near the center of Section 16, Township 13, Range 11. There they discontinued for the first time their westward course and turned south, passing over Portage Prairie....

After crossing Duck Creek the party entered South Prairie, to which they took quite a fancy, and after traveling over the land, examining the quality of the soil, locating the timber land and investigating the source of water supply, late in the afternoon they walked up to the highest point, which was about half a mile southwest of Zion's Church in Springvale, and there sat down on the green grass deliberating over the situation and comparing notes on the different localities through which they had passed during the week. Viewing the beautiful landscape before them and stretching in splendor for miles in every direction under the variable-colored rays of the setting sun, they deliberately decided to make that locality their place of future abode, hoping that they were thus forming a nucleus around which their countrymen in the future would gather to form a Welsh colony.

After deciding on the location, they prepared to return, calling first at the Fox Lake land office to enter their claims. Then, returning to their families at Milwaukee and Racine, they immediately prepared to move onto their farms, coming over in covered emigrant wagons — 'prairie schooners' — and by the middle of October they were all on their places, housed in what people nowadays would call 'miserable shanties,' but to them, after their wearisome journey, they were 'comfortable homes.' Facing the winter of 1845–46, the settlement contained in round numbers, including children, fifty-three persons, composed of nine families and seven single men.

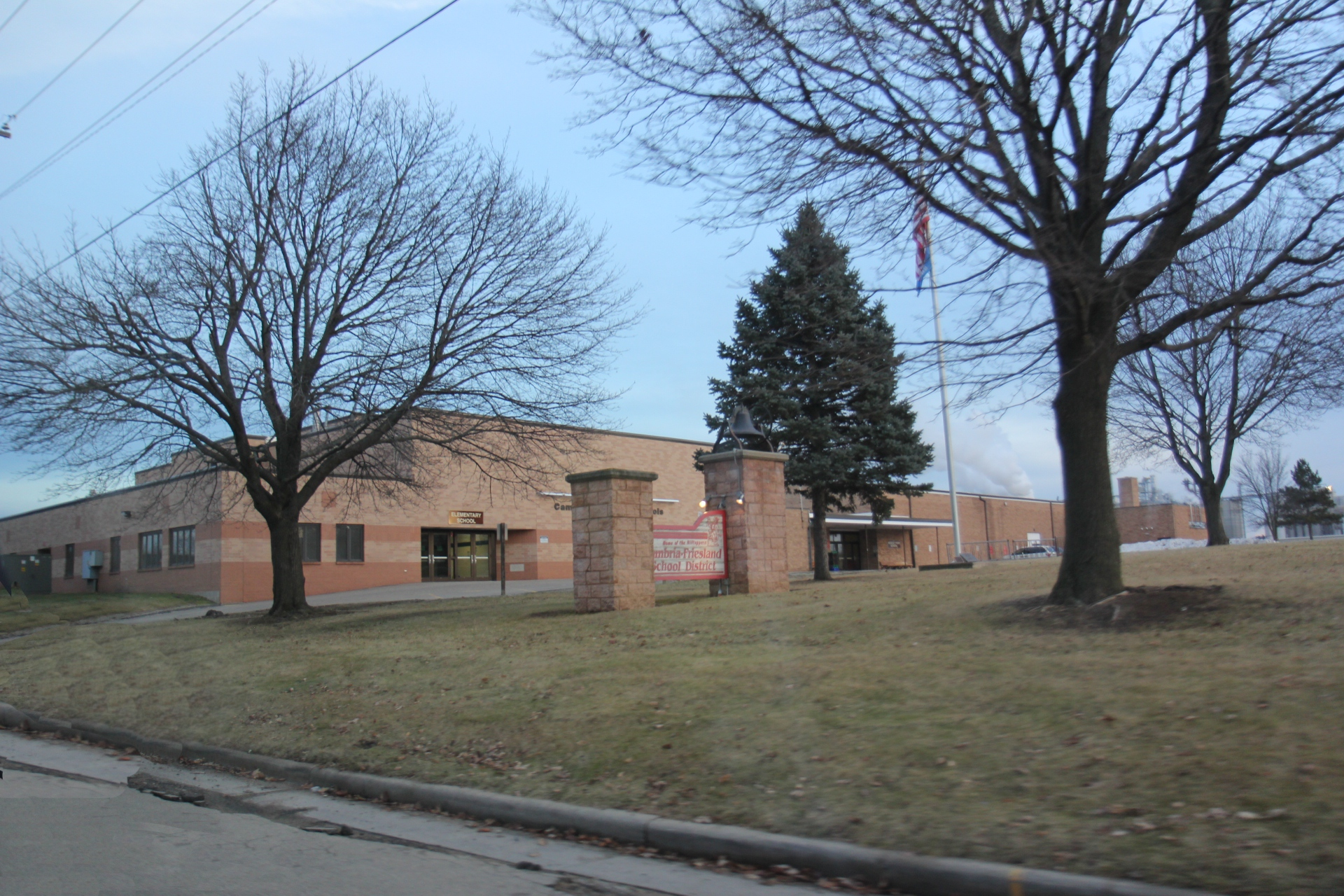
Cambria/Friesland School

Cambria was described as, "an outpost of Dolwyddelan", in an article published posthumously by J. Glyn Davies, a descendant of John Jones, Talysarn, whose brothers and sisters had emigrated to Cambria. In the article, he records that as a young man in 1898, he had visited Cambria to meet his kindred and found it was still a Welsh-speaking community which maintained its links with Wales.

In 1848 the Langdons raised a frame for a gristmill, but they had exhausted their means in their sawmill and store, and were unable to purchase the necessary machinery to operate it. In the spring of 1849 a Mr. Bell appeared and advanced money for that purpose, taking a mortgage upon the Langdon property as security. In consequence of nonpayment of the debt, the property passed into his hands, and the new owner surveyed and platted quite a large addition to the original site. In order to perpetuate his name he called the village Bellville.

Bell continued to operate the mill until 1851, when he disposed of all his holdings to John Jones and Evan Edwards. However, the new proprietors of the village, as well as the Welshmen who had settled there, were not pleased with the name Bellville, and by them it was changed to Cambria, the Latin name for Wales, probably on account of the Welsh settlers. The town was incorporated in 1866. Little growth was attained until the completion of the railroad through the place in 1857, and it has never had a rapid development.

The Didion Milling Co. plant explosion killed five workers, injured 14 others and reduced the facility to rubble on May 31, 2017. The company was fined more than $1.8 million by the U.S. Occupational Safety and Health Administration. The company agreed in 2023 to plead guilty to federal charges that employees at the plant falsified logbooks inspectors use to determine whether the plant was handling corn dust safely and complying with dust-cleaning rules from 2015 until May 2017. At least seven employees have pleaded guilty or been convicted of charges including concealing environmental violations, lying to investigators and falsifying cleaning logs. The corn products were produced for food and beverage manufacturers that require sanitation for food safety as excessive accumulation of grain dust can cause food safety problems besides the explosion risk.

== Geography ==
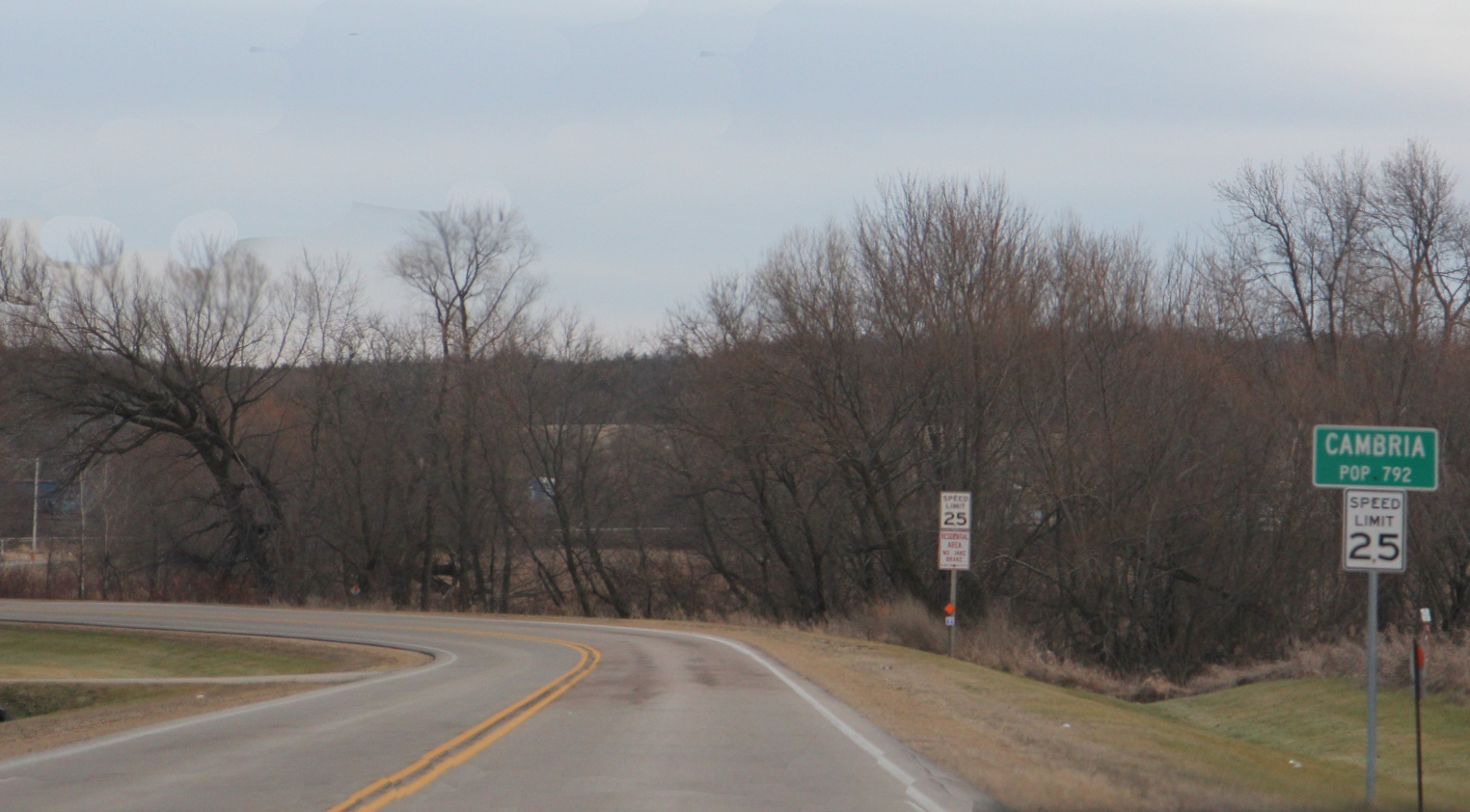
Cambria sign on County P

According to the United States Census Bureau, the village has a total area of 1.04 square miles (2.69 km^{2}), of which 0.99 square miles (2.56 km^{2}) is land and 0.05 square miles (0.13 km^{2}) is water.

== Demographics ==
Historical population
Census	Pop.	Note	%±
1870	72		—
1880	519		620.8%
1890	524		1.0%
1900	561		7.1%
1910	660		17.6%
1920	679		2.9%
1930	671		−1.2%
1940	688		2.5%
1950	633		−8.0%
1960	589		−7.0%
1970	631		7.1%
1980	680		7.8%
1990	768		12.9%
2000	792		3.1%
2010	767		−3.2%
2020	777		1.3%
2024 (est.)	768	▼	−1.2%
U.S. Decennial Census

=== 2010 census ===
As of the census of 2010, there were 767 people, 301 households, and 201 families living in the village. The population density was 774.7 inhabitants per square mile (299.1/km^{2}). There were 342 housing units at an average density of 345.5 per square mile (133.4/km^{2}). The racial makeup of the village was 91.7% White, 0.8% African American, 0.1% Native American, 0.4% Asian, 6.4% from other races, and 0.7% from two or more races. Hispanic or Latino people of any race were 12.1% of the population.

There were 301 households, of which 38.2% had children under the age of 18 living with them, 49.2% were married couples living together, 13.6% had a female householder with no husband present, 4% had a male householder with no wife present, and 33.2% were non-families. 27.9% of all households were made up of individuals, and 11.3% had someone living alone who was 65 years of age or older. The average household size was 2.55 and the average family size was 3.14.

The median age in the village was 35.7 years. 28.7% of residents were under the age of 18; 6.9% were between the ages of 18 and 24; 27.2% were from 25 to 44; 27.3% were from 45 to 64; and 10% were 65 years of age or older. The gender makeup of the village was 51.2% male and 48.8% female.

=== 2000 census ===
As of the census of 2000, there were 792 people, 307 households, and 195 families living in the village. The population density was 752 people per square mile (291.2/km^{2}). There were 339 housing units at an average density of 321.9 per square mile (124.7/km^{2}). The racial makeup of the village was 95.71% White, 0.25% African American, 0.63% Native American, 0.13% Asian, 2.9% from other races, and 0.38% from two or more races. Hispanic or Latino people of any race were 6.44% of the population.

There were 307 households, out of which 35.5% had children under the age of 18 living with them, 52.1% were married couples living together, 8.8% had a female householder with no husband present, and 36.2% were non-families. 33.2% of all households were made up of individuals, and 18.2% had someone living alone who was 65 years of age or older. The average household size was 2.58 and the average family size was 3.3.

In the village, the population was spread out, with 30.1% under the age of 18, 8% from 18 to 24, 27.9% from 25 to 44, 19.4% from 45 to 64, and 14.6% who were 65 years of age or older. The median age was 35 years. For every 100 females, there were 94.1 males. For every 100 females age 18 and over, there were 92.4 males.

The median income for a household in the village was $38,750, and the median income for a family was $49,750. Males had a median income of $35,313 versus $22,109 for females. The per capita income for the village was $17,070. About 4.2% of families and 6.6% of the population were below the poverty line, including 7.6% of those under age 18 and 9% of those age 65 or over.

== Transportation ==
Cambria is at the end of a Wisconsin and Southern Railroad branchline from Horicon.

== Notable people ==
- W. R. Davies, second president (1941–1959) of the University of Wisconsin–Eau Claire
- David R. Jones, architect
- Davy Jones, Major League Baseball player for the Milwaukee Brewers/St. Louis Browns, Chicago Cubs, Detroit Tigers, Chicago White Sox and the Pittsburgh Rebels
- Evan O. Jones, Wisconsin State Senator
- William Owen, Wisconsin State Representative
- Samuel Owens, Wisconsin State Representative
- Edward D. Roberts, California State Treasurer (1911–1915)
- Edwin Myrwyn Rowlands, Wisconsin State Senator
- Gena Rowlands, actress
- Victor W. Voorhees, architect
