= Y Ford Gron =

Defunct Welsh-language magazine

Y Ford Gron: papur Cymry'r byd ("The Round Table: a paper for the Welshmen of the world") was a popular monthly Welsh-language magazine containing news and articles on travel, fashion, the arts, and current events. It was illustrated, and included letters, editorials, and advertisements. It was published from 1930 to 1935.

Y Ford Gron was published by Hughes a'i Fab (Hughes and Son), founded in Wrexham in 1824. The company was a leading publisher of Welsh-language books, music, and journals, including Y Llenor. In 1982 the company was bought by S4C, the Welsh-language television channel.

The magazine has been digitized by the Welsh Journals Online project at the National Library of Wales.
