= Y Drych =

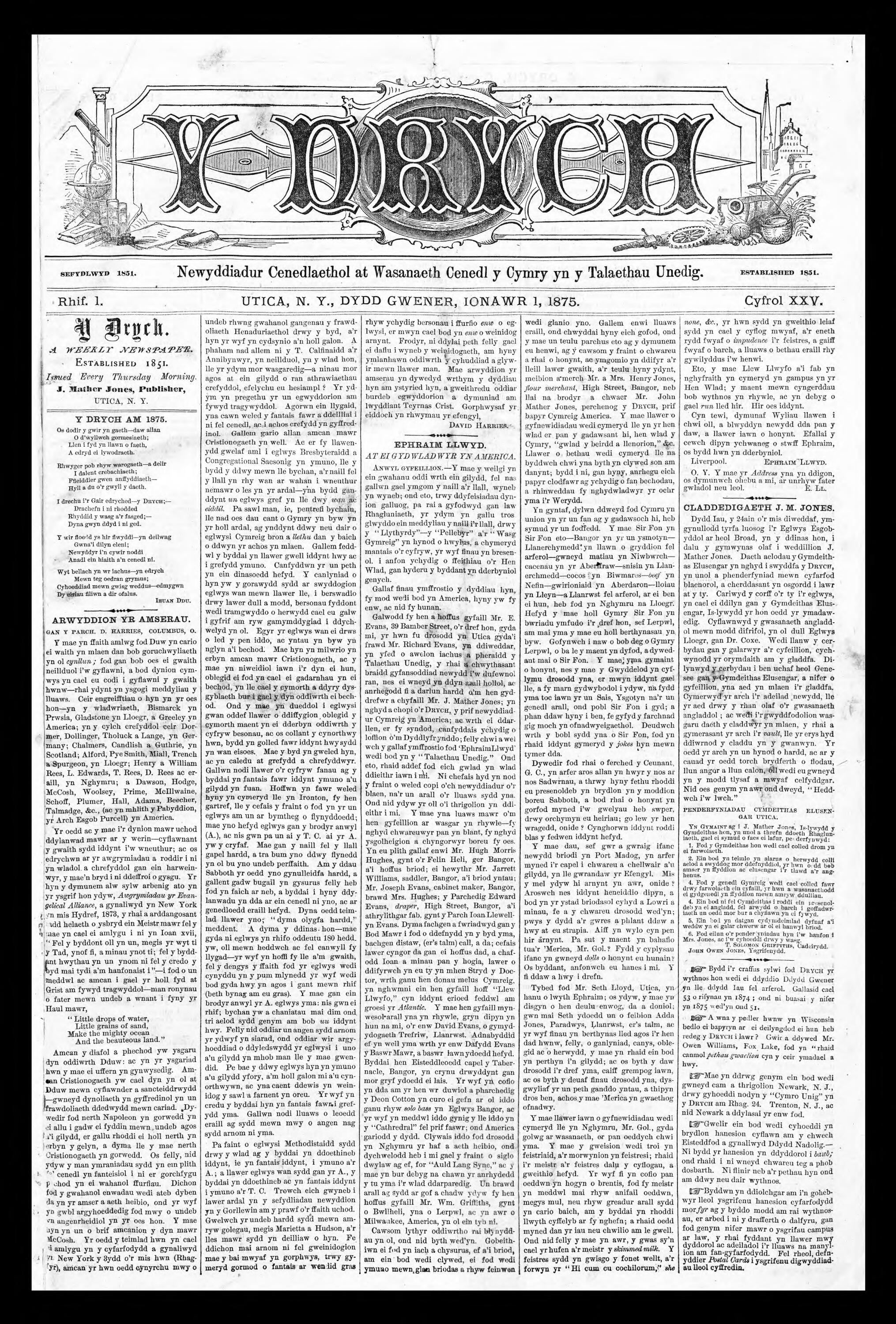
- Y Drych, 1 January 1875
- Language: Welsh

Y Drych (established in 1851) was a weekly Welsh-language newspaper published by Mather Jones. It contained news and information, focusing on religious matters. In 2003 it merged with Ninnau, another North American Welsh newspaper.
