= Historic Sixth Street Business District =

Historic district in Wisconsin, United States

- U.S. National Register of Historic Places
- U.S. Historic district
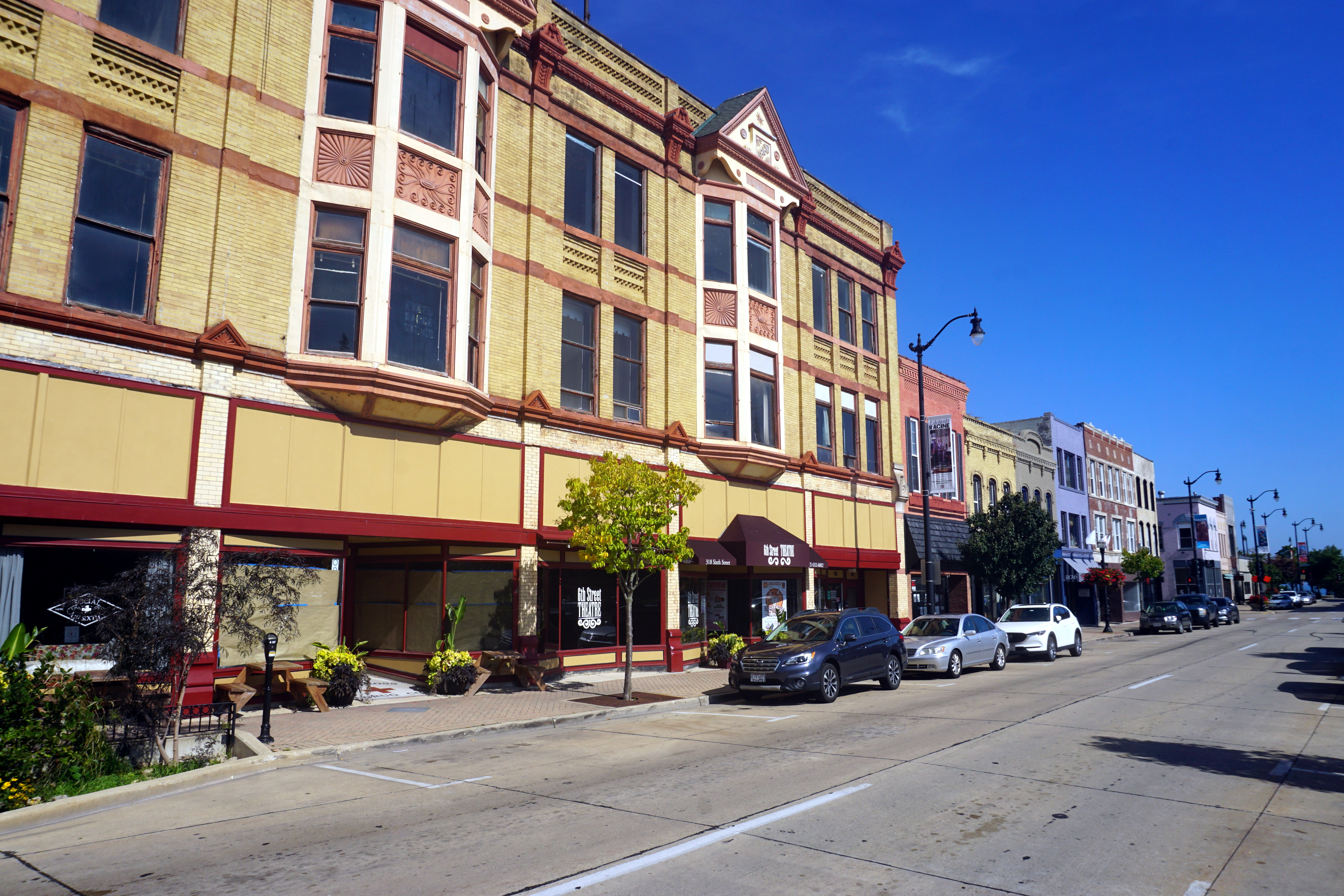
- A portion of the district.

- Location within Wisconsin Location within the United States
- Location: Racine, Wisconsin
- Coordinates: 42°43′36″N 87°47′07″W
- NRHP reference No.: 88000263
- Added to NRHP: March 24, 1988

The Historic Sixth Street Business District is a set of largely intact two and three-story shops along the main road coming into Racine, Wisconsin from the west. Most of the buildings were constructed from the 1850s to the 1950s. The district was added to the National Register of Historic Places in 1988.

Racine's settlement began in 1834 when Gilbert Knapp claimed 140 acres of land on both sides of the Root River, platting them in 1836 as the Village of Racine. Meanwhile, Stephen Campbell claimed another area to the west, which ended up platted as the Harbor Addition. At first, most of the village's buildings (cabins and houses) were in a clearing south of the river at the foot of Main Street, and the area that became this business district was far out in the woods. But in 1838 Congress allocated money to build a military road from Racine to Janesville, and it ran through the area of Sixth and Seventh Streets. With that, this area became an important route in and out of Racine from the west. The first businesses developed along Main Street south of the river, but in 1848 when the Racine and Rock River Plank Road was built from Monument Square west along Sixth Street and heading out of town to the west, the business district turned west and began to grow along Sixth Street.

Here is a sample of the district's significant buildings in the order built, showing the progression of styles and functions through the years.

- The Ernst Hueffner Building at 409 Sixth St is a modest 2-story, cream brick shop with living quarters above, built in 1861. The style is Italianate, with round-arched windows on the second story with window hoods of molded limestone. The detail on the second story is intact.
- The Stephen Campbell Building at 407 Sixth St is a 2-story building with elaborate brickwork in Italianate style. In this one the three second-story windows have windows topped with segmental arches built of three layers of brick which suggest hood moldings. Above that is a cornice with corbels and crosses in the brickwork.
- Osborn and Osgood's Block at 205-207 Sixth St is a 3-story building in Italian Renaissance revival style built in 1863. The windows on the upper stories are framed with round arches and pilasters which form arcades. On the third floor the original windows remain, with a trefoil design in the upper sashes.

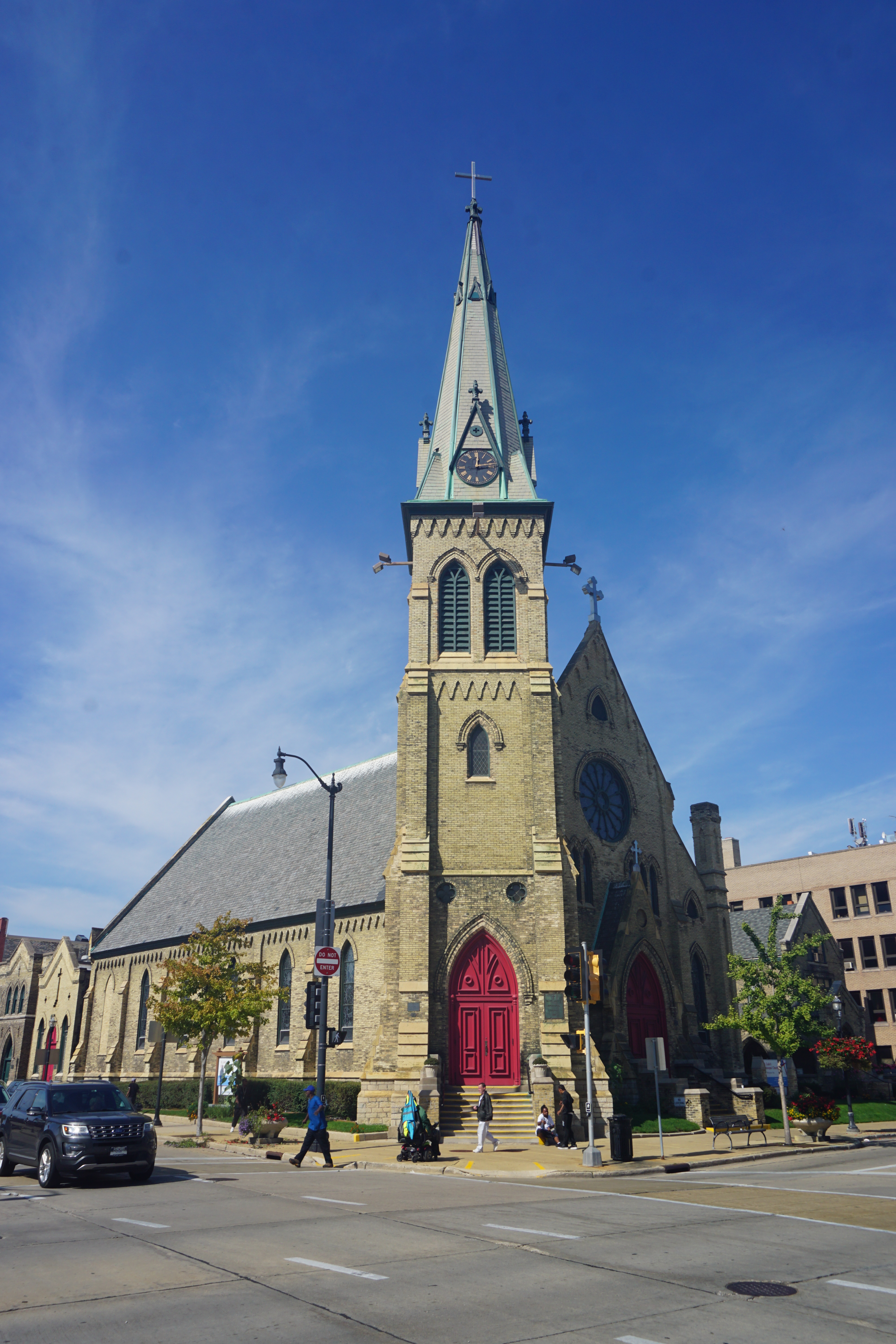
St. Luke's

- St. Luke's Episcopal Church, Chapel, Guildhall, and Rectory at 624 Main St. is an Episcopal church built in Gothic Revival style in 1866 and 1867.
- The Jacob and Charlotte Schad Building at 308 Sixth St was built in 1873, a 2-story Italianate building with brick hood moldings, limestone sills, and a brick cornice. It is rightmost in the photo above. It was built as a saloon for Charles Madory who lived upstairs. Just left of it in the photo is the very similar August Garnkaufer tailor shop at 310 Sixth St, built in 1874. Garnkaufer also lived in the quarters above his shop.
- The Fire Museum at 700 Sixth St was built in 1881 as Racine Fire Department Engine House No. 3. The building is a two-story flat-roofed Italianate structure with a three-story tower designed by David R. Jones. Company 3 was one of two volunteer companies formed in 1849, and consisted almost entirely of Welsh immigrants.
- The First Augustine Furniture Company Building at 221 Sixth St is a 3-story furniture store designed in Italianate style by David R. Jones and built in 1881. Samuel Augustine and his son John ran the store until 1920.

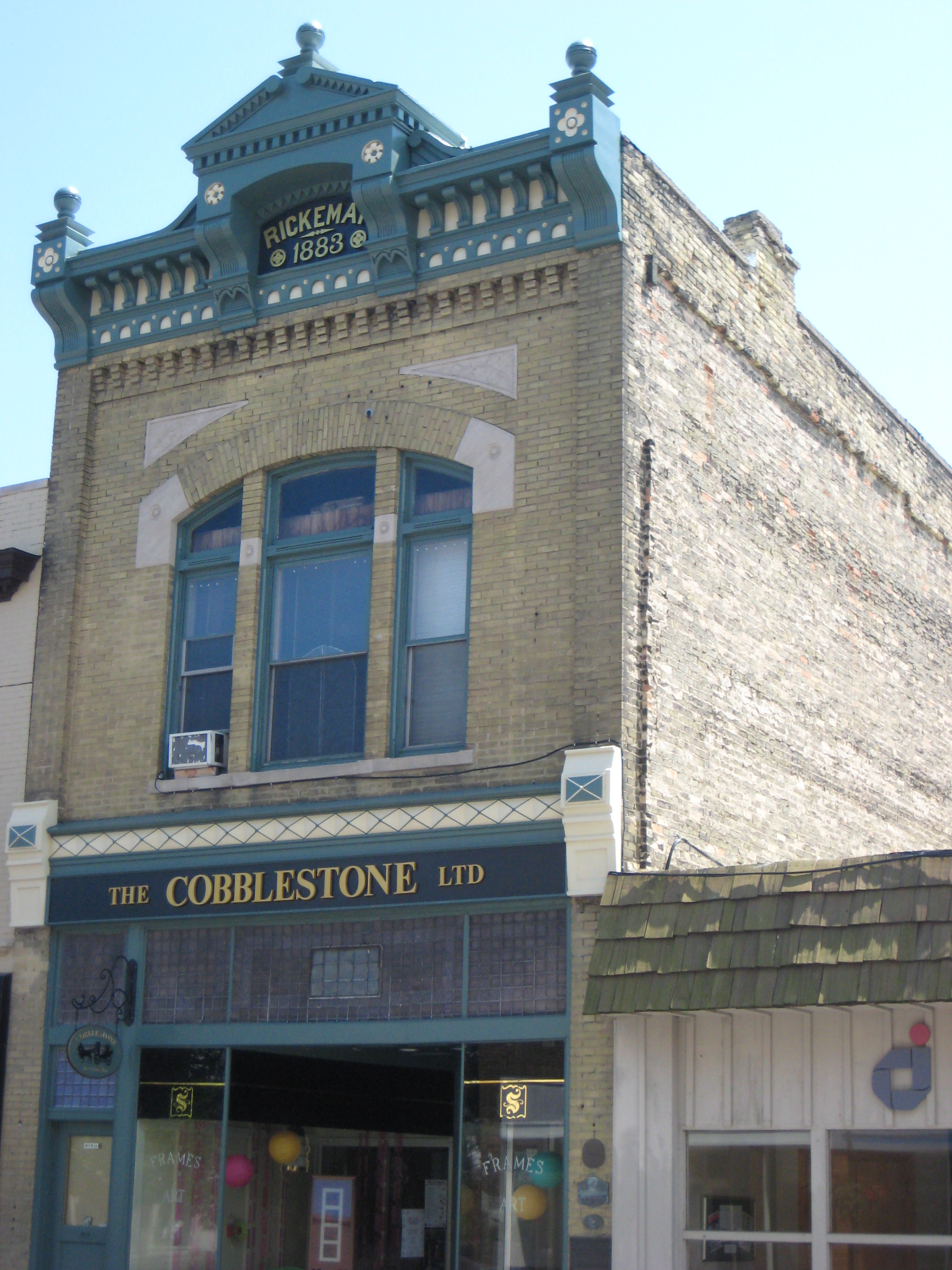
Rickeman Grocery

- The Rickeman Grocery Building at 415 Sixth St is a 2-story Italianate building with a front of cream brick and limestone trim, topped with a cornice of pressed sheet metal. George Rickeman had immigrated to the U.S. in 1853 and served in the 3rd Wisconsin Infantry during the Civil War. He ran a wine, liquor and grocery business on this site starting in 1872, and the new building housed his grocery and saloon until he died in 1894. The street-level facade was probably remodeled in the early 1900s. That was covered in the 1970s with a more modern (shingled awning) facade, but the street-level is now restored to its 1910 character.
- The Gertrude Fleisher Building at 613 Sixth St was built as a 2-story dry goods store in 1884. The styling is Italianate, similar to the Rickeman Grocery above, but simpler and with the storefront probably little changed from 1884, other than paint.
- The YMCA Building at 314-320 Sixth St is a three-story building designed by Racine architect James Gilbert Chandler and built in 1886. The architectural style is Queen Anne, typified by the bay windows, the corner turret, and the variety of surface textures.
- The Church of the Good Shepherd at 625 College Ave. is a Romanesque Revival-styled building designed by James Gilbert Chandler and built in 1895. This Universalist congregation was founded in 1842, the third church in Port Gilbert/Racine. Prominent members included Gilbert Knapp (founder of Racine) and J.I. Case. P.T. Barnum donated/lent the congregation $500 to buy the lot for their first church on Monument Square in 1851. Olympia Brown, the first woman ordained by a regularly established denomination in the U.S., served as minister from 1878 to 1887, when she resigned to focus on work for women's suffrage.
- The Robinson Building at 201-203 Sixth St is a 5-story office building built around 1900. It was designed by C.A. Dickhaut in an eclectic style. Some of the arrays of windows are grouped Chicago-style. Some are framed by Neoclassical pilasters which lead up to a cornice decorated with an egg and dart motif.
- The Frank Lintner Building at 613 Wisconsin Ave is a unique 3-story building with two huge bay windows at the second and third story and a sheet metal cornice. It is built of sand brick with limestone trim. This type of brick was produced by William and Chauncey Lathrop's Sand Brick Chemical Company until it proved less durable than conventional bricks, around the time this building was constructed.
- The Ernest Johnson Building at 209 Sixth St is a 3-story brick structure with a facade of white glazed terra cotta, built in 1911.
- The Constance Dombrowski Building at 516 College Ave is a 3-story building clad in stucco on the second and third floors and topped with a denticulated pressed sheet metal cornice.
- The First Ernst Klinkert Building at 615 Sixth St was built in 1915 as a 2-story tavern and pool hall. The exterior is red brick trimmed in limestone. The cornice at the top and the hint of a pediment are Neoclassical in style, but the rectangular lines of brick and the horizontality show the influence of Prairie Style. Klinkert was an immigrant from Frankfurt who worked for Valentine Blatz in Milwaukee before he bought Phillip Shelling's City Brewery, which grew into the E. Klinkert Brewing Company, the largest brewery in Racine.

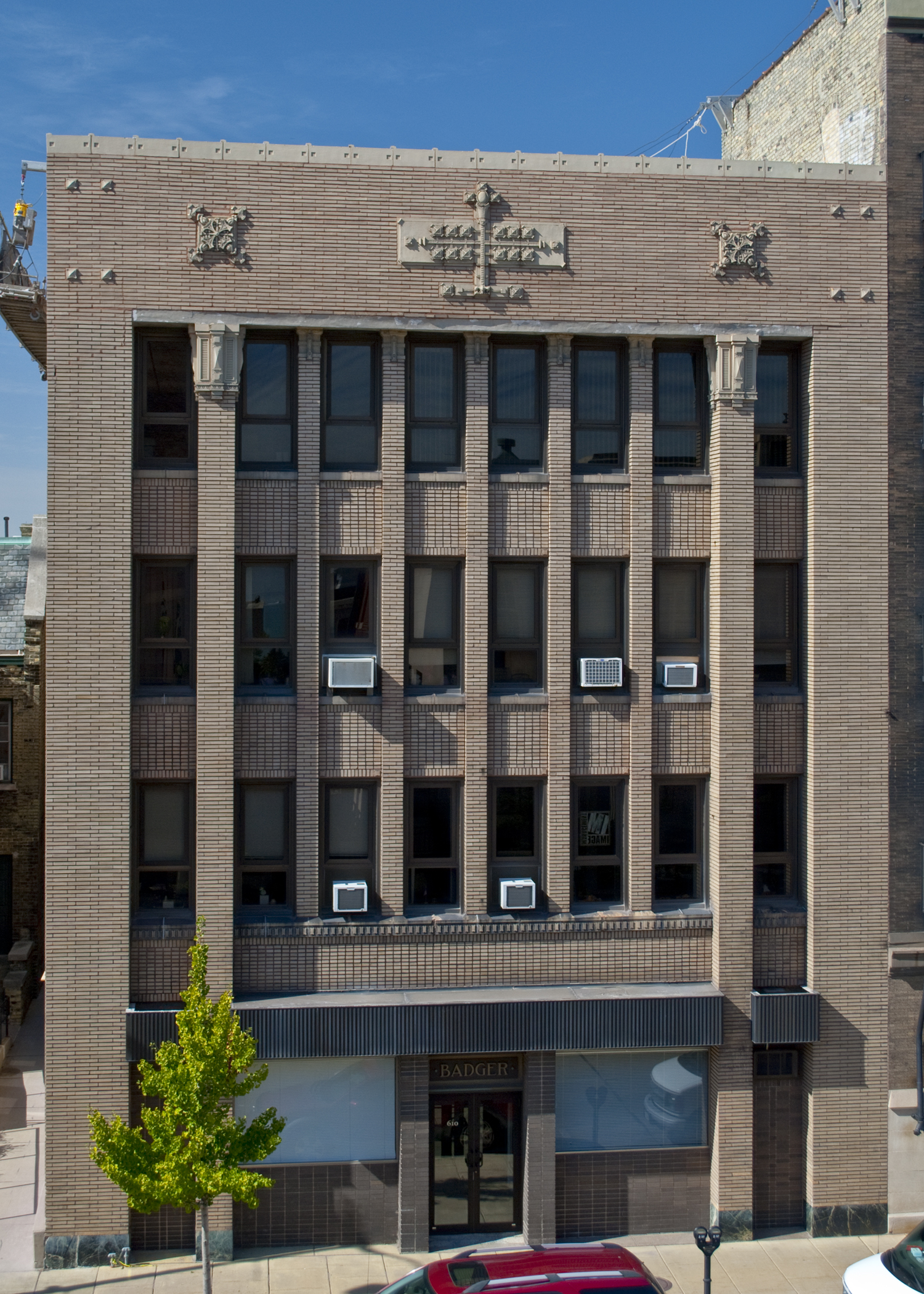
Badger Building

- The Badger Building at 610 Main St is a 4-story office building designed in Prairie Style by Edmund Bailey Funston and built in 1915.
- The Robert E. Miller Building at 219 Sixth St is a more modest Prairie Style structure built in 1915 to house Miller's floral company. Over 100 years later, Miller's Flowers is still in the family, still in the same building.
- The American National Bank Building at 302-304 Sixth St is a 3-story building in its own style, red brick trimmed in limestone and decorated with three rosettes. It was built in 1918.
- The George Kamm Building at 522 College Ave was built in 1926 as an automobile showroom, a 3-story Commercial style building.
- The Century Motor Company Building at 512-522 Sixth St was built as a showroom for Studebaker automobiles in 1927. Its horizontal lines and yellows and greens are Prairie Style. The geometric ornaments and colored terra cotta show an influence of Art Deco.
- The Fred J. Hermes Building at 614-616 Sixth St was built in 1927, a 3-story building suggesting Spanish Colonial Revival style. The front is brown brick with limestone trim. At the top the parapet is decorated with carved shields, medallions, and twisted balusters.
- Kaiser's at 218 Sixth St is a 2-story store with a facade redone in 1928 in glazed pink terra cotta designed by Frank J. Hoffman in an Art Deco style. It housed Maurice and Helen Kaiser's men's clothing store for forty years. It stands little altered from 1928.
- The First National Bank Trust Department at 216 Sixth St is next door to Kaiser's, and similar in style. It is also Art Deco designed by Frank J. Hoffman, but here the medium is gray granite and it was built in 1933.
- The Fred W. Plath Building at 405 Sixth St is a one-story store built in 1930, with large display windows and the exterior walls finished in green marble and glazed white terra cotta, with terra cotta decorations.

(For more information on any of these, see the references. The WHS links contain photos and the NRHP nomination contains architectural details.)
