= Old Main Street Historic District (Racine, Wisconsin) =

Historic district in Wisconsin, United States

- U.S. National Register of Historic Places
- U.S. Historic district
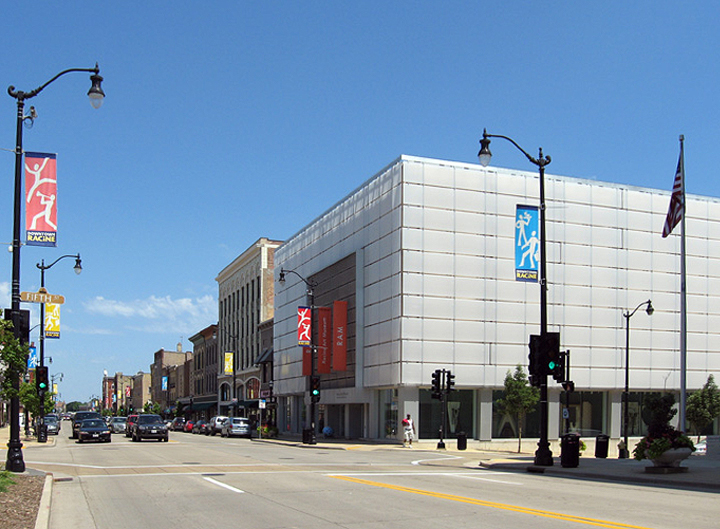
- Racine Art Museum and the historic district

- Location within Wisconsin Location within the United States
- Location: Roughly bounded by Second St., Lake Ave., Fifth St., and Wisconsin Ave., Racine, Wisconsin
- Coordinates: 42°43′46″N 87°47′0″W
- Area: 17 acres (6.9 ha)
- Built: 1847
- Architectural style: Italianate, Victorian commercial
- NRHP reference No.: 87000491
- Added to NRHP: August 11, 1987

The Old Main Street Historic District in Racine, Wisconsin is an area including a section of Main Street and which is roughly bounded by Second St., Lake Ave., Fifth St., and Wisconsin Ave. It is a 17-acre (6.9 ha) area with elements dating back to 1847. It was listed on the National Register of Historic Places in 1987.

In 1987, it included 73 buildings deemed to contribute to the historic character of the area, most built during the 1879s to 1920s, and 22 non-contributing buildings. It comprises portions of eight blocks.

A sample of buildings:

- The Durand and Hill Block at 246 Main St. was built around 1849. It was designed by Lucas Bradley, Racine's first architect, and may have originally been Greek Revival-styled. But it was damaged in the fire of 1882 and probably restyled as then-modern Italianate when it was repaired. It is three stories tall, with four pilasters framing the windows on the upper stories and with a bracket atop each pilaster supporting the elaborate pressed-metal cornice. The building initially housed offices of Henry Durand, a businessman who dealt in land, produce, lumber, coal, and shipping. He also claimed to have issued the first insurance policy in Wisconsin.
- The McClurg Building at 245 Main St. was begun in 1857, and is the finest of Italianate-style buildings in the district.
- The four buildings at 320, 322, 324 and 326 Main St. carry a similar design, though they had different owners and were built at different times. All are 2-stories tall, 3 bays wide, with similar cornices, and Italianate styling. The Sebastian Besick building at 320 Main was built first, in 1869, with three round-arched windows. The middle two buildings were built the following year, with very similar designs, except the upper windows are a bit smaller. They are the Peil, Ritter & Schmeisser building at 322 Main and the John Neumann building at 324 Main. The John Liegler building at 326 Main was built much later, in 1901, with smaller windows with the arches flattened.
- The Henry Werner building at 327 Main St. was built in 1880, a brick saloon and tailor shop an unusual wide bay window on the second story, with accents in red sandstone against pale brick, and only a partial cornice.

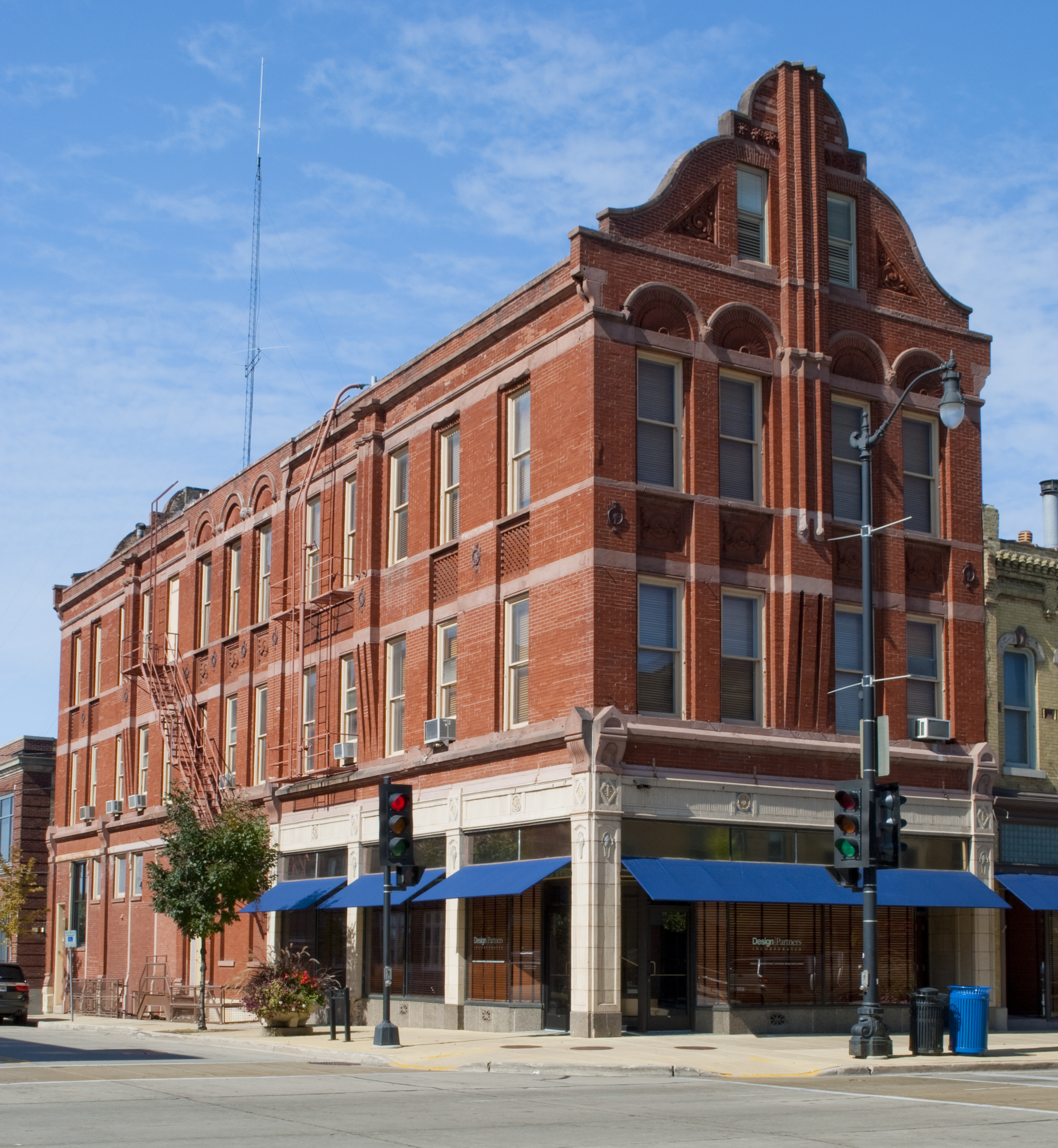
Chauncey Hall building

- The Chauncey Hall Building at 338-40 Main St. was built in 1883, a Queen Anne design by E. Townsend Mix.

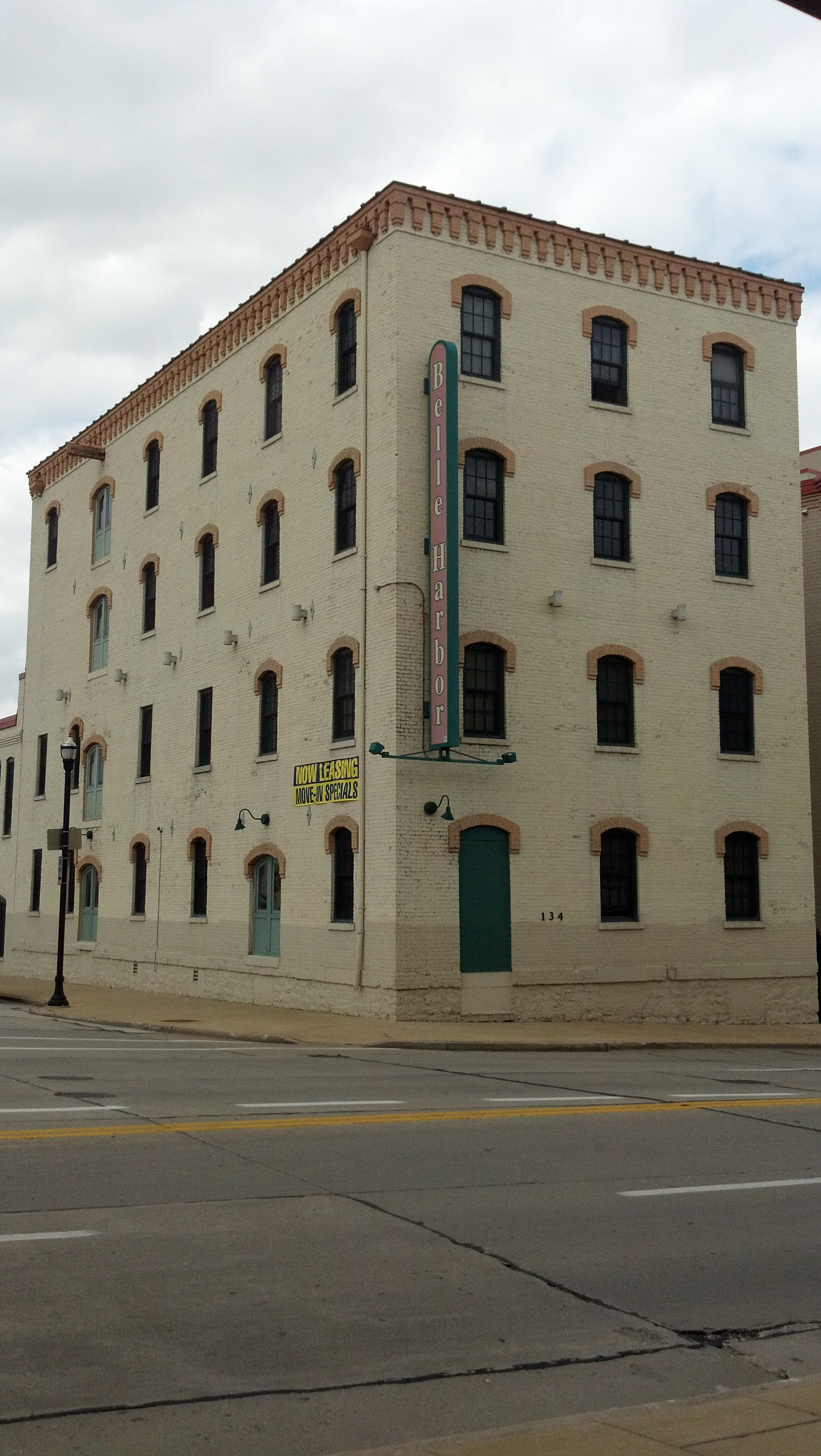
Thomas Driver & Sons Sash and Door factory

- The Thomas Driver and Sons Manufacturing Company at 214 State St. was built in 1888, a cream brick sash and door factory.
- The F.J. Mrvicka Saloon at 231 Main St. was built in 1891 by the Pabst Brewing Company to promote their beer. It was designed by Arnold Heinen in Queen Anne style, with a wooden bay window on each side of the second story, each bay topped with a pagoda-like roof curving up to a dormer and weather vane. The gable between is elaborately decorated. In the 1920s the facade was reworked in a half-timbered style to fit the German restaurant that operated there.
- The Miller Brewing Company Saloon, just down the street at 237 Main St., was built in 1902 in Romanesque Revival style, and may be little changed from when it was built.

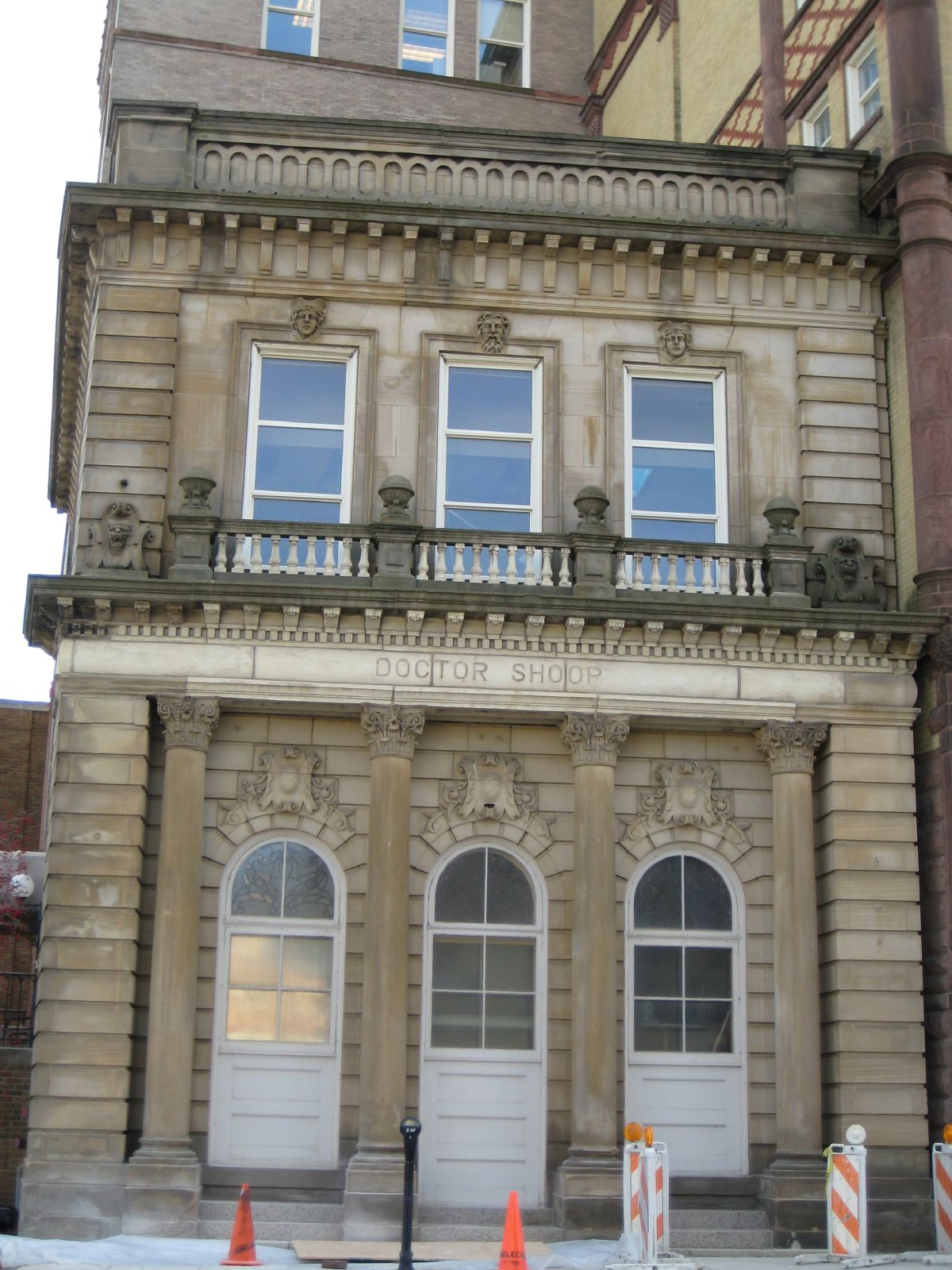
Part of the Shoop building

- The Shoop Building at 222 Main St. was designed by James Gilbert Chandler and built from 1893 to 1902 for Dr. Clarendon I. Shoop, whose patent medicines were sold around the world until passage of the Pure Food and Drug Act in 1906.
- The Hugh Gorton Building at 400 Main St. was probably designed by James Gilbert Chandler. His offices operated out of the second floor from 1899 to 1918. Before that, Hugh Gorton ran a butcher shop at this location. The building later housed a hat shop.

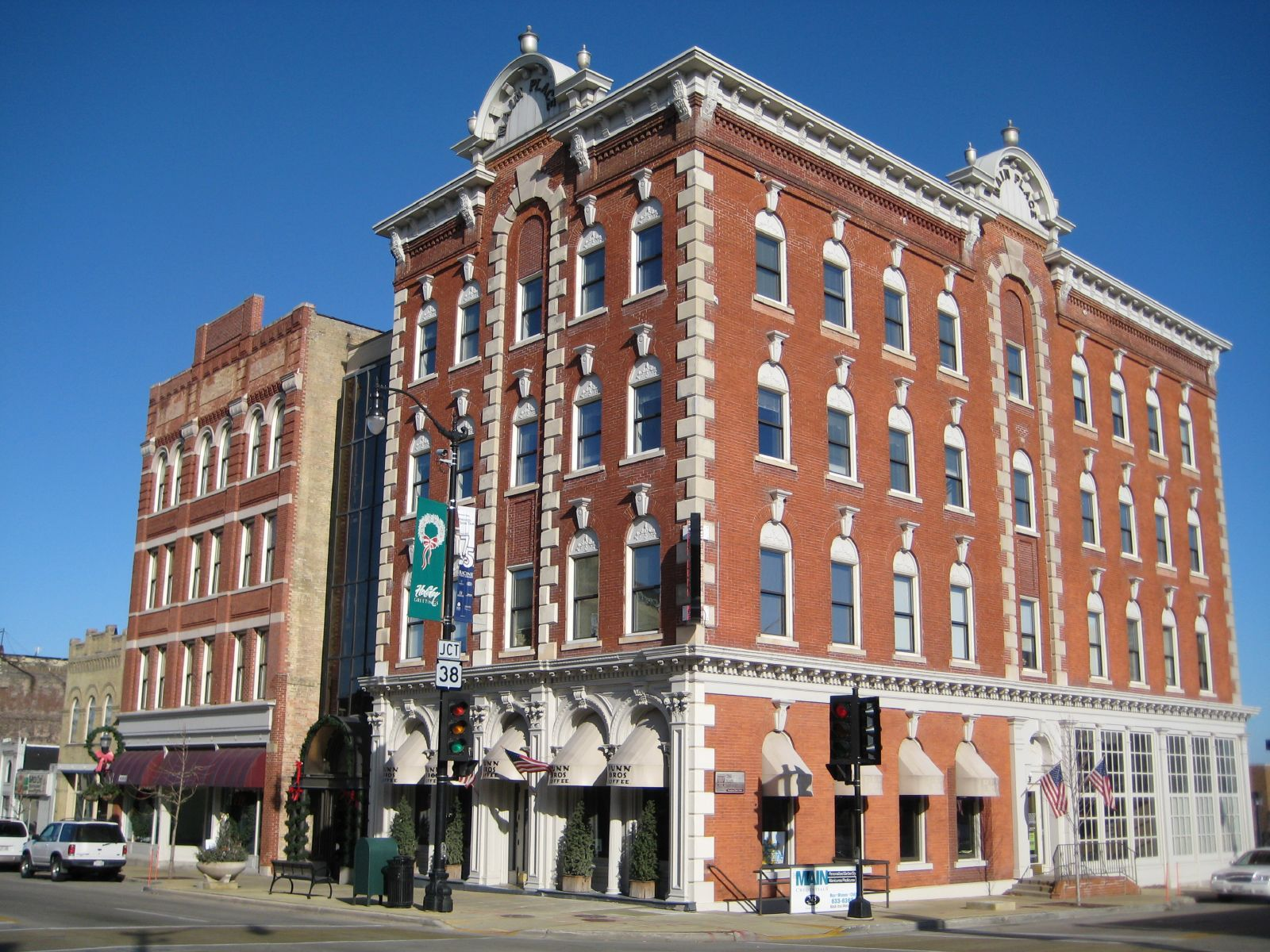
Secor building on left and McClurg on right

- The Martin M. Secor Building at 239-41 Main St. was built in 1904, a 4-story red brick building with stone trim designed by A.L. Flegel to complement the McClurg building, which Secor then owned next door.
- The Racine Fire Department Engine House No. 5 at 300 Fourth St. was designed by Albert Arthur Guilbert and built in 1907, two stories with a four-story corner watch-tower. Its horizontal lines suggest Prairie Style.
- The YMCA building at 217 Fourth St., built in 1915, was also designed by Guilbert, showing some Prairie Style elements in a massive 4-story building.
- The Manufacturer's National Bank at 440 Main St. was remodeled in 1919 to a Neoclassical white marble facade.
- The Second Journal Printing Company Building at 212 Fourth St. is a 2-story building designed by Lambert Bassindale with rectangular Prairie Style lines and geometric designs and arrays of Chicago-style windows.
- Zahn's Building at 500 Monument Square is a 4-story department store designed by Edmund Bailey Funston in Chicago Commercial style with prominent arrays of windows and built in 1924.
- The Paramount Radio Stores Building at 318 Main St. had its facade remodeled in 1929, skinned over with pink glazed terra cotta tiles topped with a fake mansard roof of green Spanish tile.
- The White Tower Restaurant at 235 Main St was built by a restaurant chain of the same name, a one story with a 1.5-story tower on the corner, all covered with white glazed brick. The restaurant served short-order food from this building 24 hours a day from construction in 1929 until 1964.
- The 4th Street Bridge was a bridge that connected 4th Street to Bridge Street until it was condemned and demolished in 1961 and 1963, respectively.
