= Wisconsin's 62nd Assembly district =

American legislative district for Racine, Wisconsin

Wisconsin's 62nd State Assembly district
- 2024 map defined in 2023 Wisc. Act 94; 2022 map defined in Johnson v. Wisconsin Elections Commission; 2011 map was defined in 2011 Wisc. Act 43
Assemblymember
Angelina Cruz; D–Racine
since January 6, 2025 (1 years)
- Demographics: 58.34% White; 20.75% Black; 18.22% Hispanic; 1.25% Asian; 2.22% Native American; 0.13% Hawaiian/Pacific Islander
- Population (2020) • Voting age: 60,115; 44,595
- Website: Official website
- Notes: Racine, Wisconsin

The 62nd Assembly district of Wisconsin is one of 99 districts in the Wisconsin State Assembly. Located in Southeastern Wisconsin, the district comprises part of eastern Racine County, including the northern half of the city of Racine, along with the villages of North Bay and Wind Point, and parts of southern Caledonia and northeast Mount Pleasant. The district contains Racine Harbor, Racine Art Museum, Old Main Street Historic District, Historic Sixth Street Business District, the Racine Zoo, Memorial Hall, Johnson Wax Headquarters, the historic Wind Point Lighthouse, the Frank Lloyd Wright-designed Wingspread complex, and the John H. Batten Airport. The district is represented by Democrat Angelina Cruz, since January 2025.

The 62nd Assembly district is located within Wisconsin's 21st Senate district, along with the 61st and 63rd Assembly Districts.

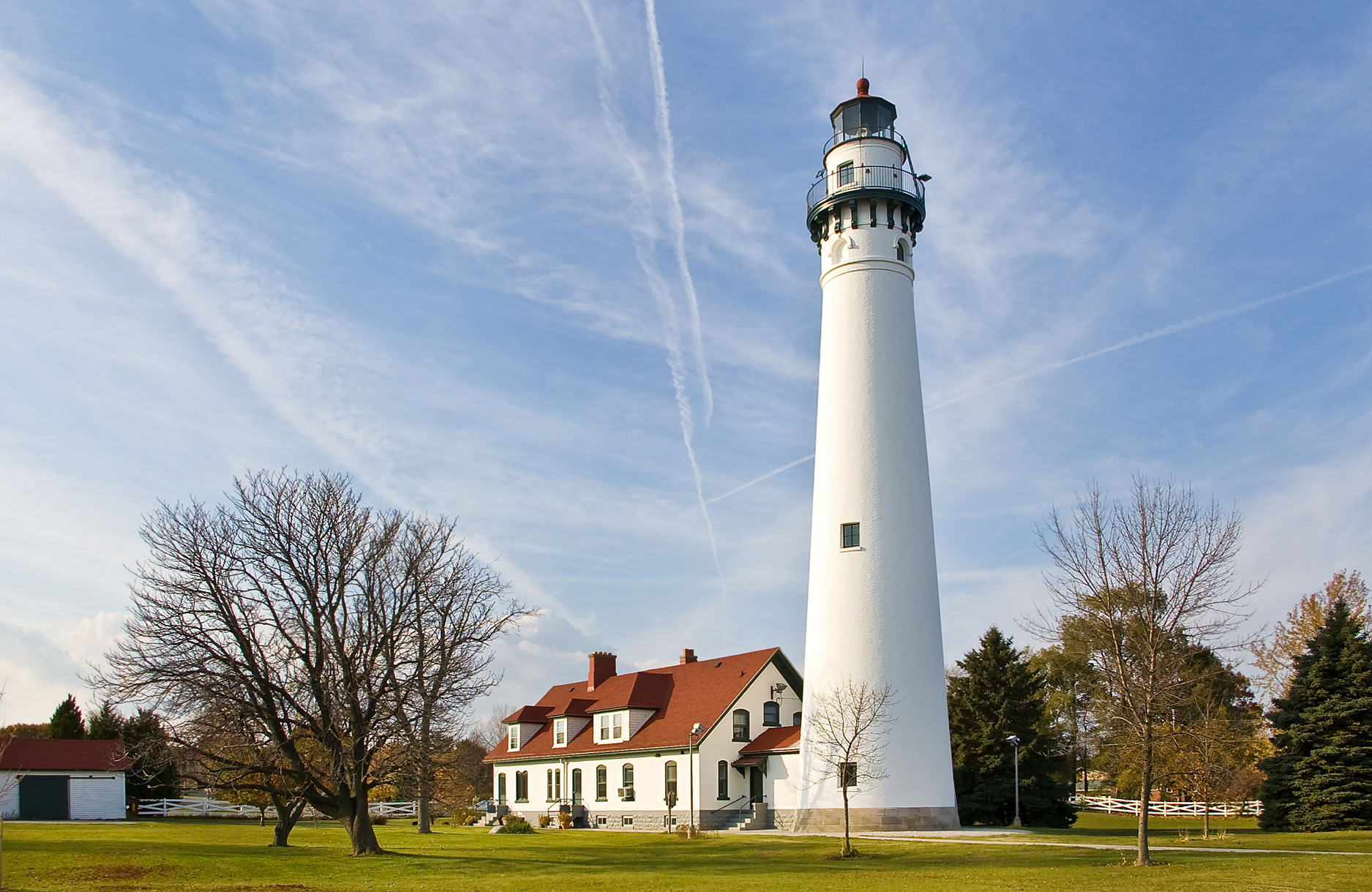
Wind Point Lighthouse

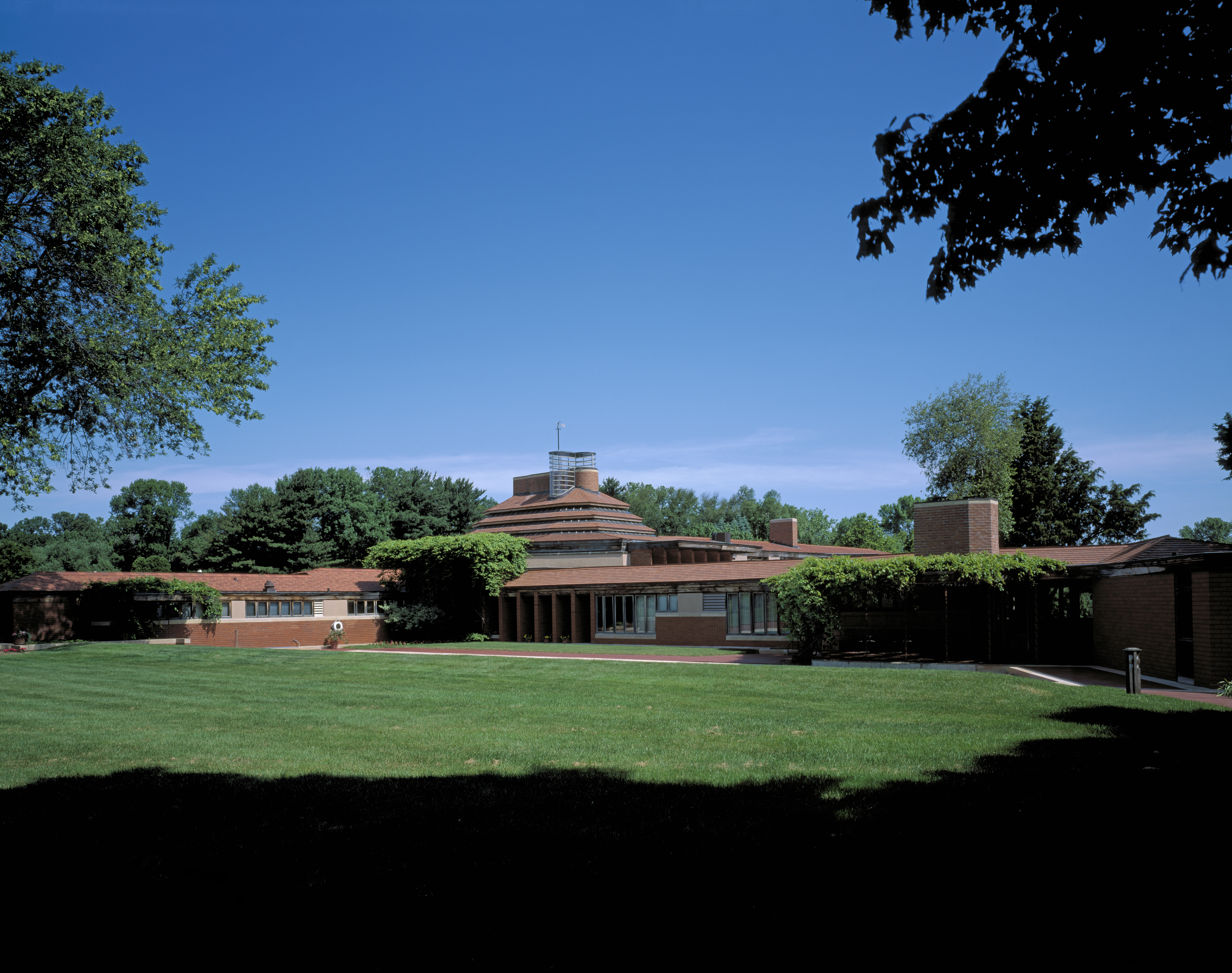
Wingspread building in Wind Point

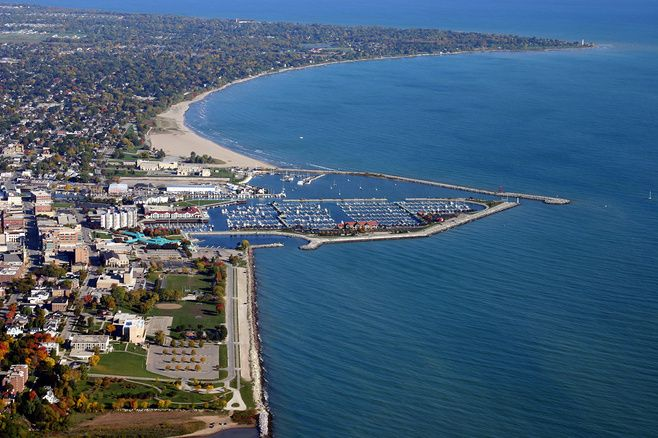
Aerial view of Racine lakefront

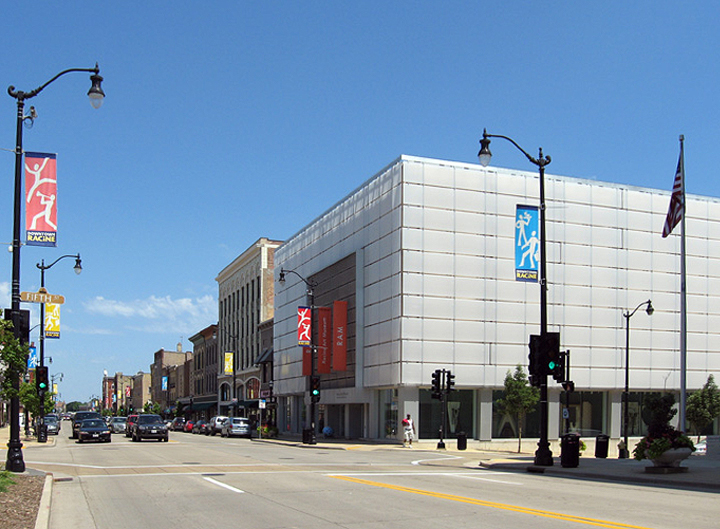
Racine Art Museum in the Old Main Street Historic District

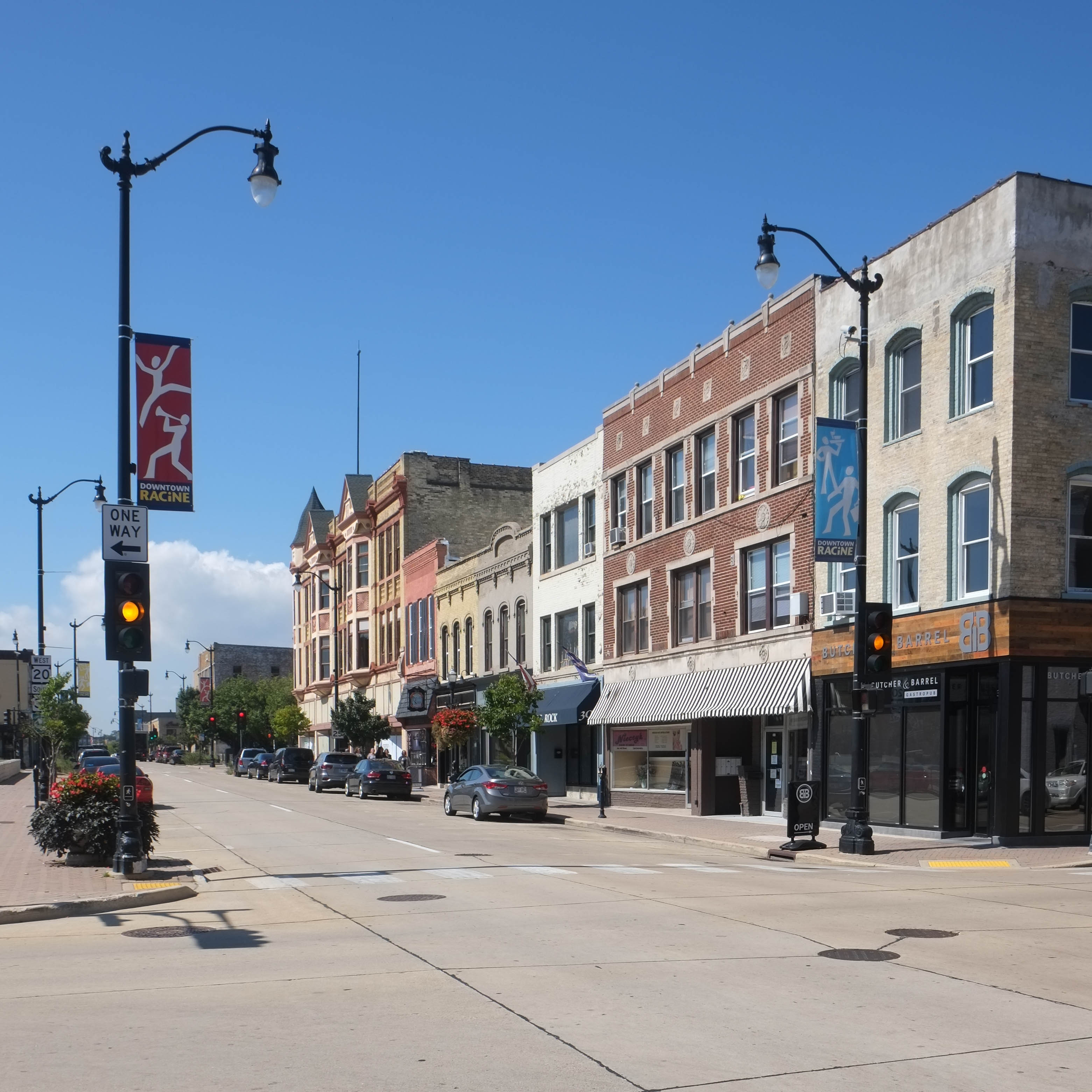
Historic Sixth Street Business District

== List of past representatives ==
List of representatives to the Wisconsin State Assembly from the 62nd district
Member	Party	Residence	Counties represented	Term start	Term end	Ref.
District created
R. Michael Ferrall	Dem.	Racine	Racine	January 1, 1973	January 5, 1981	
Jeffrey A. Neubauer	Dem.	Racine	Racine	January 5, 1981	January 3, 1983	
William A. Kasten	Rep.	Mosinee	Marathon	January 3, 1983	January 7, 1985	
Jeffrey A. Neubauer	Dem.	Racine	Racine	January 7, 1985	January 3, 1989	
Kimberly Plache	Dem.	Racine	Racine	January 3, 1989	June 13, 1996	
--Vacant--			Racine	June 13, 1996	January 6, 1997	
John Lehman	Dem.	Racine	Racine	January 6, 1997	January 3, 2007	
Cory Mason	Dem.	Racine	Racine	January 3, 2007	January 7, 2013	
Tom Weatherston	Rep.	Caledonia	Racine	January 7, 2013	January 7, 2019	
Robert Wittke	Rep.	Wind Point	Racine	January 7, 2019	January 6, 2025	
Angelina Cruz	Dem.	Racine	Racine	January 6, 2025	Current	
