= Weatherston =

Weatherston is a surname. Notable people with the surname include:

- David Weatherston (born 1986), Scottish footballer
- Katie Weatherston (born 1983), Canadian ice hockey player and coach
- Tom Weatherston (born 1950), American industrial engineer and politician

== See also ==
- Weatherson
