= Angelina Cruz =

21st century American politician

Member of the Wisconsin State Assembly from the 62nd district
- Incumbent
- Assumed office January 6, 2025
- Preceded by: Robert Wittke

Personal details
- Born: May 4, 1979 (age 47) Racine, Wisconsin, U.S.
- Party: Democratic
- Education: University of Wisconsin–Parkside (B.A.); University of Wisconsin–Milwaukee (M.S.)
- Occupation: Educator, politician

Angelina M. Cruz (born c.1979) is an American public school teacher, union leader, and Democratic politician from Racine, Wisconsin. She is a member of the Wisconsin State Assembly, representing Wisconsin's 62nd Assembly district since 2025. She is the first Latina to represent Racine County in the Wisconsin Legislature. She is also president of Racine Educators United, Racine's teachers' union, since 2016.

== Early life and career ==
Angelina Cruz was born in Racine, Wisconsin, and grew up in the neighboring town of Caledonia, Wisconsin. She graduated from Racine's St. Catherine's High School in 1997. After initially attending University of Wisconsin–Madison, studying journalism, she transferred to University of Wisconsin–Parkside after her sophomore year and switched majors. She earned her bachelor's degree in sociology in 2003, with a certificate in elementary and middle sociology.

After student-teaching during her college years, she was employed by the Racine Unified School District shortly after her graduation; she began as a fifth grade teacher then moved to Mitchell Middle School. While working as a teacher, she continued her education at the University of Wisconsin–Milwaukee, earning her master's degree in educational policy.

Although she was a member of the teachers' union since the start of her employment, she took a new interest in the affairs of the union after the passage of 2011 Wisconsin Act 10—Governor Scott Walker's self-described "budget repair" bill. One of the act's most controversial aspects was the elimination of collective bargaining rights for public sector unions. The bill immediately provoked mass protests at the state capitol, and Cruz traveled to Madison to join the demonstration. After the protests, Cruz continued leaning into union activities. In 2016, she ran for president of Racine's teachers' union, the Racine Education Association, and defeated the incumbent president, Aaron Eick. She oversaw the unification of the Racine Education Association with the Racine Educational Assistants Association in 2021. She has been the president of the combined union, Racine Educators United, since then, and is now the longest-serving president in the history of the Racine teachers' union.

In 2021, after Jill Underly was elected Wisconsin's Superintendent of Public Instruction, she named Cruz to her transition team.

== Political career ==
In 2024, Cruz made her first run for public office, running for Wisconsin State Assembly in the redrawn 62nd Assembly district. Wisconsin had undergone a major redistricting in early 2024, due to a Wisconsin Supreme Court decision striking down the decade-old Republican gerrymander. Under the new plan, Racine was divided between the 62nd district on the north side and the 66th district on the south side, creating two Democratic-leaning districts. 62nd district Republican incumbent Robert Wittke opted to leave the district to run in the more Republican-friendly 63rd district, creating an open seat in the 62nd. Ultimately no other candidate filed to run for the 62nd district, and Cruz won the seat unopposed in the 2024 election. She took office in January 2025; she is the first Latina to represent Racine County in the Wisconsin Legislature.

== Personal life and family ==
Angelina Cruz is the granddaughter of Mexican American immigrants who settled in Wisconsin. She is the second of four children born to Domingo S. Cruz Jr. and his wife Trinidad "Trini" (née Gonzalez); Angelina has three brothers. Her father is a prominent Racine lawyer and former assistant district attorney. Angelina followed after her mother, who was also a teacher in Racine, a member of the teachers' union, and an active Democrat.

Cruz is queer; she resides in downtown Racine.

== Electoral history ==
=== Wisconsin Assembly (2024) ===
Wisconsin Assembly, 62nd District Election, 2024
Party	Candidate	Votes	%	±%
General Election, November 5, 2024
Democratic	Angelina M. Cruz	19,060	95.24%	
	Scattering	953	4.76%	
Total votes		20,013	100.0%	
Democratic gain from Republican				

Wisconsin State Assembly
Preceded by Robert Wittke	Member of the Wisconsin State Assembly from the 62nd district January 6, 2025 – present	Incumbent
