= Robert Wittke =

American Republican politician, member of the Wisconsin Assembly

Member of the Wisconsin State Assembly
- Incumbent
- Assumed office January 6, 2025
- Preceded by: Robin Vos
- Constituency: 63rd district
- In office January 7, 2019 – January 6, 2025
- Preceded by: Tom Weatherston
- Succeeded by: Angelina Cruz
- Constituency: 62nd district

President of the Racine Unified School Board
- In office April 2017 – April 2019
- Preceded by: Michael Frontier
- Succeeded by: Brian O'Connell

Member of the Racine Unified School Board from the 9th district
- In office April 2016 – April 2019
- Preceded by: Position Established
- Succeeded by: Kimberly Hoover

Personal details
- Born: September 23, 1957 (age 69) Racine, Wisconsin, U.S.
- Party: Republican
- Spouse: Alison
- Children: 4
- Education: University of Wisconsin–Eau Claire
- Profession: Accountant

Robert Otto Wittke Jr. (born September 23, 1957) is an American accountant and Republican politician from Racine County, Wisconsin. He is a member of the Wisconsin State Assembly, representing Wisconsin's 63rd Assembly district since 2025; he previously represented the 62nd Assembly district from 2019 to 2025. Before his election to the Assembly, Wittke was president of the Racine Unified School Board for two years.

== Biography ==
Born in Racine, Wisconsin, to Robert Wittke Sr. and Margaret Wittke née Jankowski, Wittke graduated from William Horlick High School in 1975 and received a B.A. in accounting from the University of Wisconsin–Eau Claire in 1980. He worked as a tax accountant for Modine Manufacturing in Racine from 1980 to 1986, then at Snap-on Inc. in Kenosha from 1988 to 1994. He then worked for Deloitte in their tax consultancy from 1994 to 2002. Since 2012, he has been employed by CORPTAX, a tax software as a service company based in Deerfield, Illinois.

Wittke resides in Wind Point, Wisconsin, he is married and has four children.

== Political career ==
Wittke first ran for Racine Unified School Board in 2013, placing fourth in a top-three at-large election.

In 2015, the Wisconsin Legislature passed a law requiring Racine Unified School Board seats to be assigned to geographic districts, rather than elected at-large. Wittke ran for the newly drawn ninth district in the 2016 school board elections. He was elected in April 2016, defeating retiree Kurt Squire. A year later, in April 2017, Wittke was elected School Board President.

In April 2018, Tom Weatherston announced that he would not seek re-election to a fourth term representing the 62nd district in the Wisconsin State Assembly. Wittke announced his candidacy for the seat the next day. He defeated John Leiber in the Republican Primary, and went on to defeat former State Senator John Lehman in the 2018 general election.

Wittke announced that he would not seek re-election to the Racine School Board in 2019.

== Electoral history ==
=== Racine School Board, At-large district (2013) ===
| Year | Election | Date | Elected | | | | Defeated | | | | Total | Plurality |
|---|---|---|---|---|---|---|---|---|---|---|---|---|
| 2013 | General | Apr. 2 | Michael Frontier | Nonpartisan | 9,318 | 20.91% | Robert Wittke Jr. | Non. | 6,825 | 15.32% | 44,552 | 280 |
| 2013 | General | Apr. 2 | Julie L. McKenna (inc) | Nonpartisan | 9,038 | 20.29% | Roger Pfost | Non. | 5,620 | 12.61% | 44,552 | 280 |
| 2013 | General | Apr. 2 | Christopher Eperjesy (inc) | Nonpartisan | 8,431 | 18.92% | Kristie Formolo | Non. | 5,239 | 11.76% | 44,552 | 280 |

=== Racine School Board, 9th district (2016) ===
| Year | Election | Date | Elected | | | | Defeated | | | | Total | Plurality |
|---|---|---|---|---|---|---|---|---|---|---|---|---|
| 2016 | General | Apr. 5 | Robert Wittke | Nonpartisan | 3,238 | 61.42% | Kurt Squire | Non. | 1,723 | 38.58% | 5,272 | 1,515 |

=== Wisconsin State Assembly, 62nd district (2018–2022) ===
| Year | Election | Date | Elected | | | | Defeated | | | | Total | Plurality |
|---|---|---|---|---|---|---|---|---|---|---|---|---|
| 2018 | Primary | Aug. 14 | Robert Wittke | Republican | 3,931 | 67.50% | John Leiber | Rep. | 1,885 | 32.37% | 5,824 | 2,046 |
| 2018 | General | Nov. 6 | Robert Wittke | Republican | 16,035 | 54.87% | John Lehman | Dem. | 13,161 | 45.04% | 29,223 | 2,874 |
| 2020 | General | Nov. 3 | Robert Wittke (inc) | Republican | 20,540 | 58.63% | August Schutz | Dem. | 14,463 | 41.28% | 35,034 | 6,077 |
| 2022 | General | Nov. 8 | Robert Wittke (inc) | Republican | 18,236 | 61.36% | Anthony Hammes | Dem. | 11,445 | 38.51% | 29,719 | 6,791 |

=== Wisconsin State Assembly, 63rd district (2024) ===
| Year | Election | Date | Elected | | | | Defeated | Total | Plurality |
|---|---|---|---|---|---|---|---|---|---|
| 2024 | General | Nov. 5 | Robert Wittke | Republican | 27,163 | 96.80% | --unopposed-- | 28,060 | 26,266 |

Wisconsin State Assembly
| Preceded by Tom Weatherston | Member of the Wisconsin State Assembly from the 62nd district January 7, 2019 – January 6, 2025 | Succeeded by Angelina Cruz |
| Preceded by Robin Vos | Member of the Wisconsin State Assembly from the 63rd district January 6, 2025 – present | Incumbent |
Educational offices
| Preceded by Michael Frontier | President of the Racine Unified School Board; April 2017 – April 2019 | Succeeded by Brian O'Connell |
