= National Association of Muslim Lawyers =

Legal organization of the United States

- Predecessor: Muslim JD
- Formation: 2001
- Type: 501(c)(6) organization
- Tax ID no.: 52-2283398
- Purpose: serving American Muslim legal professionals
- Location: Chicago
- Website: www.naml.info

National Association of Muslim Lawyers (NAML) is an organization of Muslim lawyers founded in 1996 as 'Muslim JD'. In 2000, it was renamed to its current name. NAML conducts an annual conference with several hundred legal professionals participating in it, including Muslim attorneys federal judges, law professors, and law students. It is a 501(c)(6) organization according to the IRS in the year 2001. In a brief before the Supreme Court, NAML describes itself as the largest professional organization for American Muslim lawyers and its "activities include organizing educational programs on current legal topics of interest, supporting regional Muslim bar associations, and serving the law-related needs of the general public through community service efforts."

NAML's board of directors includes representatives of the National Muslim Law Students Association and 15 local Muslim bar associations, including the Bay Area Association of Muslim Lawyers (BAMBA), Muslim Bar Association of Southern California (MBASC), Capital Area Muslim Bar Association (CAMBA), Florida Muslim Bar Association, Georgia Association of Muslim Lawyers (GAML), Muslim Bar Association of Chicago (MBAC), New England Muslim Bar Association (NEMBA), Michigan Muslim Bar Association (MMBA), Association of Muslim American Lawyers (NYC Area) (AMAL), Philadelphia Muslim Lawyers, Dallas-Fort Worth Muslim Bar Association (DFWMBA), Muslim Bar Association of Houston (MBAH), Muslim Bar Association of New York (MuBANY), New Jersey Muslim Lawyers Association (NJMLA), and Oregon Muslim Bar Association (OMBA).

In 2005, the organization Muslim Advocates was founded as extension of NAML. In 2007, Shari'ah expert and president emeritus of NAML, Mohammad Fadel, who teaches law at the University of Toronto, quoted a Muslim jurist as saying that in Islamic law, when spouses disagree as to whether the husband has exercised lawful discipline or used excessive violence, it is presumed that the wife is telling the truth unless the husband is known for his piety. In 2017, the president of NAML, Asifa Quraishi-Landes criticised the law proposal American Laws for American Courts banning Sharia in Wisconsin spearheaded by Tom Weatherston stating "They see any acknowledgment of Sharia in American Muslim life as a first step to the Trojan Horse." In the murder case of Nabra Hassanen, NAML expected the criminal to receive a life sentence without parole.

In 2016, a new NAML was relaunched, with a new board of directors composed of representatives of eleven Muslim lawyer associations from San Francisco to New York City as well as the National Muslim Law Students Association.

After its reboot in 2016, NAML restarted its now-annual conferences, beginning with Chicago, Illinois for the first national conference since 2007, with the theme "Advancing Justice; Serving Communities."

In 2018, under the leadership of Gadeir Abbas as president, NAML filed an amicus brief in Trump v. Hawaii, with the assistance of Patterson Belknap Webb & Tyler LLP. NAML's 2018 national conference, with the theme "Lawyers as Leaders", was in Dallas, Texas.

In 2019, under the leadership of Aliya Khalidi as president, NAML convened experts from CAIR, Muslim Advocates, and the ACLU to host a webinar on the potential impact of a Muslim Brotherhood terrorist designation. With leadership from Yasir Billoo, NAML Secretary and the 2019 Conference Chair, NAML brought its annual national conference to the east coast—to Orlando, Florida, with the theme "Shaping Our Future: Innovation and Social Responsibility." NAML also filed an amicus brief in Int'l Refugee Assistance Project v. Trump, again with the assistance of Patterson Belknap Webb & Tyler LLP. Finally, NAML also made a stronger effort to include law students in the organization.

During the pandemic in 2020, under the leadership of Saleema Snow as president, NAML started a speaker series called "Lunch and Learn," which highlighted Muslim attorneys around the country. Topics included Islamic Family Law in American Courts, Employment Based Immigration, and other current subjects. The 2020 conference was held virtually and the theme was "Race & the Law," specifically intended to highlight Black voices within the Muslim community in the wake of the murder of George Floyd. NAML conference members discussed the ways in which race played a role in their fields.

== See also ==
- National Association of Women Lawyers
- National LGBTQ+ Bar Association
- National Negro Bar Association
