= United States Post Office (Racine, Wisconsin) =

- U.S. Post Office-Racine Main
- U.S. National Register of Historic Places
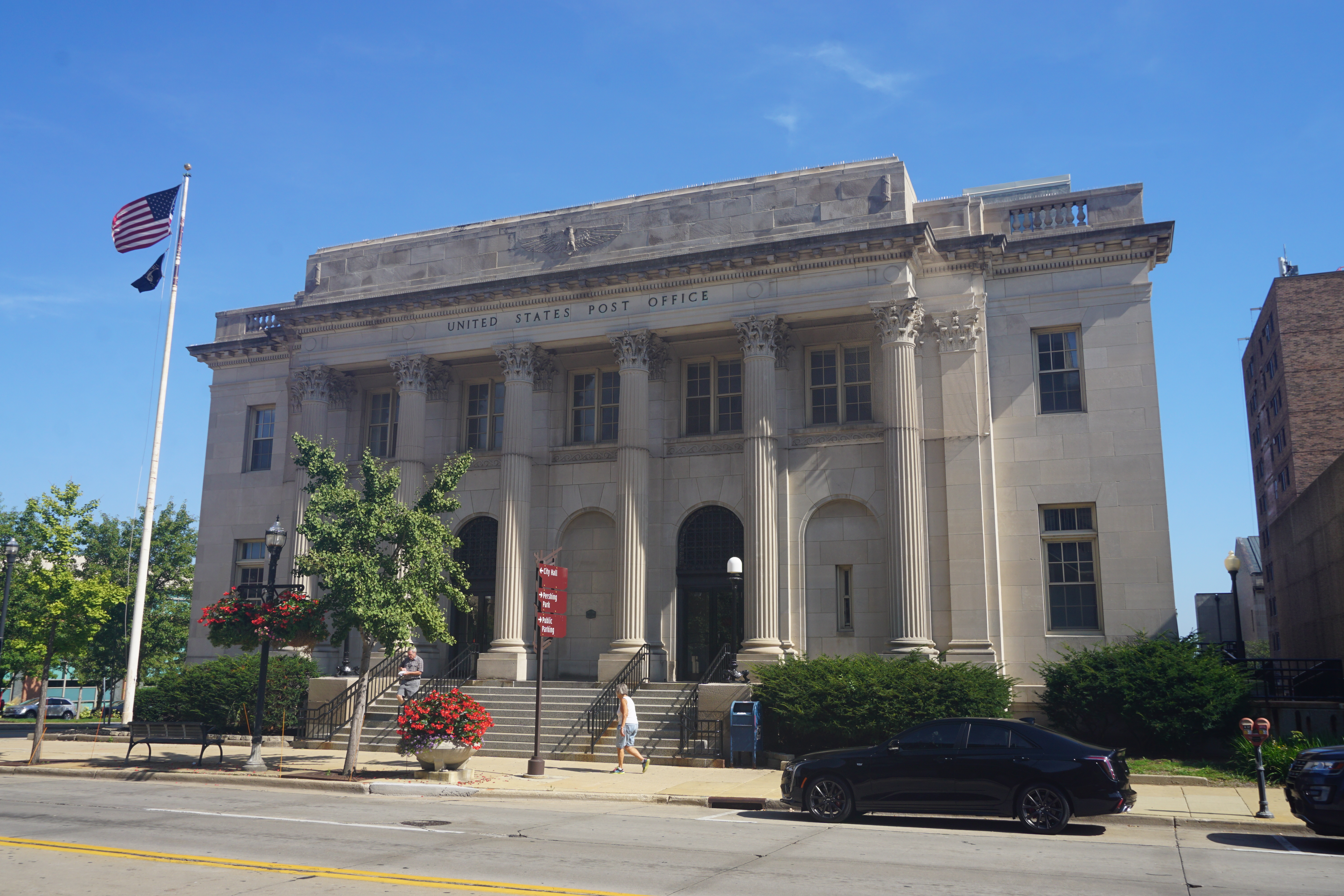

- Location within Wisconsin
- Location: 603 Main Street, Racine, Wisconsin
- Coordinates: 42.726944°N 87.782222°W
- Built: 1930
- Architect: Office of the Supervising Architect under James A. Wetmore
- Architectural style: Classical Revival
- NRHP reference No.: 85000989
- Added to NRHP: May 8, 1985

The United States Post Office in downtown Racine, Wisconsin is a post office operated by the United States Postal Service. It is located at 603 Main Street, in a classical revival-style building designed by the Office of the Supervising Architect under James A. Wetmore, and completed in July 1931. The building was listed on the National Register of Historic Places in 1985.

== Description ==
The Racine Main Post Office is a three-story rectangular building, located two blocks from the shore of Lake Michigan. The dimensions of the lot are 89 feet by 160 feet. The building is faced primarily with Bedford limestone from Indiana, except for parts of the obscured south facade which are covered with red brick. Built on a slope, the main entrance is located on the second floor, on the west facade facing Main Street. This side of the building is adorned with six Corinthian columns, reaching 22 feet up from the top of the front steps to the portico. On the frieze, the words "United States Post Office" and an eagle are engraved. The building's north facade, along Sixth Street, features a row of Corinthian pilasters between each set of windows. The east facade faces Lake Street, and the ground floor features the loading dock and faces the building's parking lot. The south side is obscured by the McMynn Towers apartment building and an attached public parking structure. At the west end of this side, a wheelchair ramp offers handicap access to the office's front counter. At the east end, facing the parking lot, a retaining wall has been painted with a mural that features a bald eagle in front of the rising sun, labeled "Racine - A Nice Place to Live".

The interior of the building is supported by an inner framework of reinforced concrete around steel. Aside from the front counter and mailbox area, the majority of the building consists of large open spaces where mail is processed. The second-story workroom is lit by two large skylights, which occupy a square area of the roof where the top floor is cut out of the rectangular structure. A short chimney stands in the center of the roof.

== History ==
Regular federal mail service to the town of Racine began in 1836, when a post office was established at the rapids of the Root River, although it was moved into the town itself later that year. Being the area's first post office, it served areas as distant as Lake Geneva. For much of the town's early history, the office would be located at the house of the elected postmaster, thus moving every time elections were held. In 1891, the Treasury Department began planning for the city's first designated post office building, and its first federal building, purchasing the site where the current building stands. The location was purchased from Robert Baker, an executive at the J.I. Case Company. Adam H. Harcus and his firm were awarded a $44,347 contract to construct a stone building for a "custom-house and post-office" in September 1896. The building was criticized by some for looking church-like, leading the post office to chisel its name above the front door.

Congress appropriated $329,000 in funding for the new post office building on October 18, 1928. During the demolition of the old building and construction of the new building, mail operations temporarily moved to the Shoop Building on State Street. The Racine Main Post Office was dedicated July 25, 1931, and opened the following Monday, during a citywide "Dedication Week" that also saw the completion of a new City Hall and county courthouse in Racine. The building was called a monument to Congressman Henry Allen Cooper, the representative of Racine's district, who sought to bring public works projects to his constituency and died before the building's dedication.

A proposal in 1991 would have moved the city's main post office to a triangular lot along State Street, but this plan was never put in place and that site is now home to Dr. Martin Luther King, Jr. Plaza. The post office suffered an anthrax scare during the U.S. anthrax attacks of 2001, when a postal worker discovered brown powder in a sorting bin. Another closing plan was announced in 2009, where the building would be sold and its operations consolidated with the other three existing offices in Racine. Since then, the downtown office's staff and open hours have both been reduced, but it remains open as of May 2017.

== See also ==
- National Register of Historic Places listings in Racine County, Wisconsin
- List of United States post offices
