= Rickeman Grocery Building =

Coordinates: 42.72637°N 87.78546°W

- U.S. National Register of Historic Places
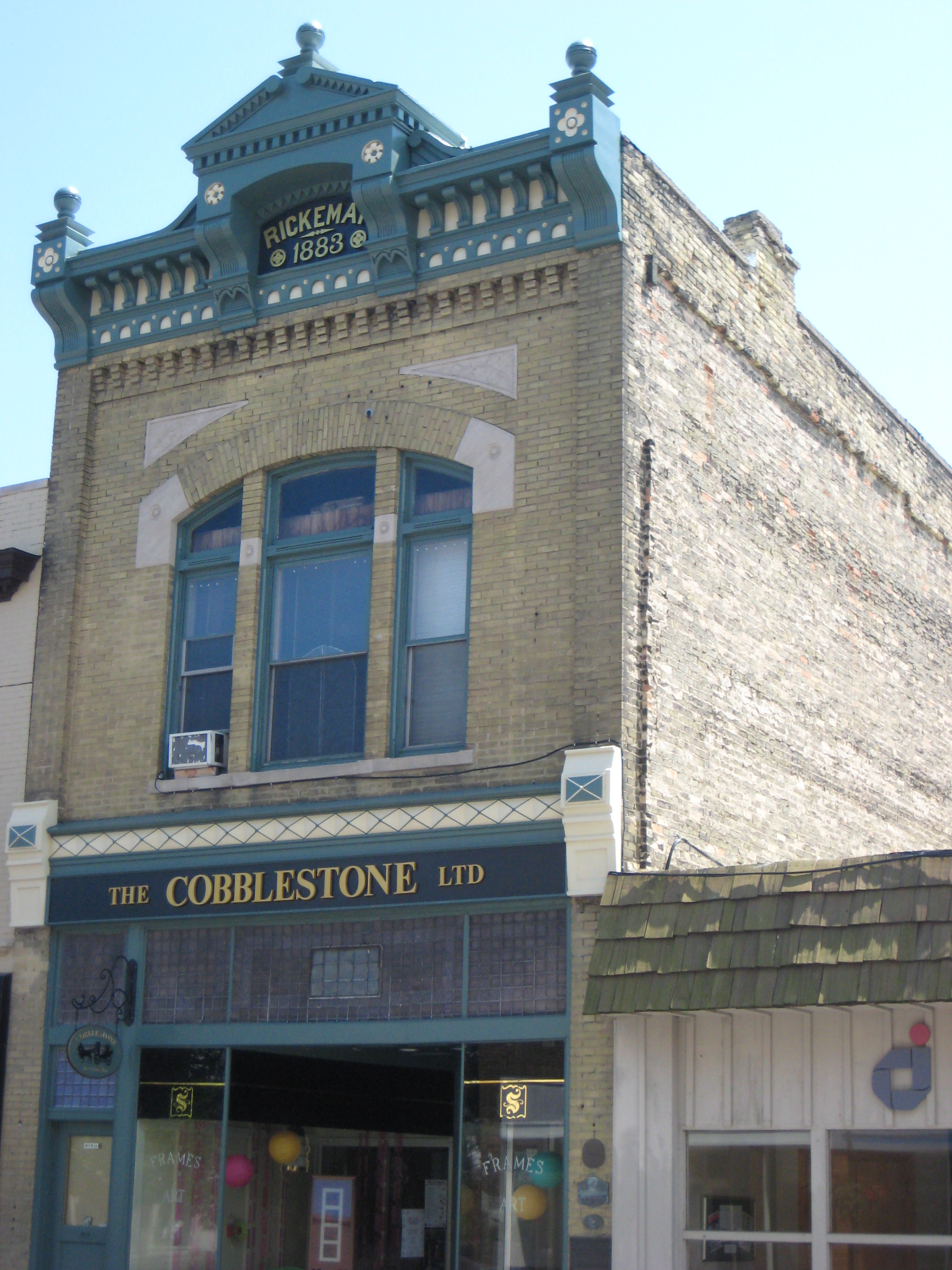
- Rickeman Grocery Building
- Location: 415 6th St. Racine, Wisconsin
- Built: 1883
- NRHP reference No.: 82000701
- Added to NRHP: March 1, 1982

The Rickeman Grocery Building is a historic commercial building located in downtown Racine, Wisconsin. It was constructed in 1883 for grocer George Rickeman. Located on the south side of State Street between College Avenue and Park Avenue, the building contributes to the Historic Sixth Street Business District. The building, an example of the Late Victorian architectural style, was added to the National Register of Historic Places in 1982.

== History ==
Built in 1883, the Rickeman Building was constructed for a grocery store run by George A. Rickeman, a German immigrant and veteran of the Civil War who fought with the 3rd Wisconsin Infantry. He came to Racine in the 1850s to become a cabinet maker, before briefly joining the Colorado Gold Rush in 1859. After the war, he founded his grocery and saloon at 53 6th St., four blocks east of the later building, in 1866. Following his death in 1894, his wife Catherine and his sons George and Fred operated the business. A fire on the morning of September 2, 1902, damaged parts of the building destroyed over $10,000 worth of goods on the store's second floor. Catherine's claim was disputed by her insurance company, and the case was taken to the Wisconsin Supreme Court, which found in her favor in 1904. Between 1905 and 1910, the store was repaired and remodeled.

By 1917, the grocery had closed and the building took on a new tenant: Daniel C. Metcalf, who operated a Kuppenheimer clothing store. This clothing shop reopened as the Longworth Store in 1925, which closed not long afterward. The next business to occupy the space was a grocery store that closed and was put up for sale in 1928. Two new business opened in the building the following year: Leo Brennan's restaurant, a sandwich shop, and the Photo-Crafts Shop, a Kodak store which moved out of the building shortly after. The Brennan restaurant became John Wagner's in 1931, and was later named John Wagner's Food, Brennan & Connors, before closing in 1943.

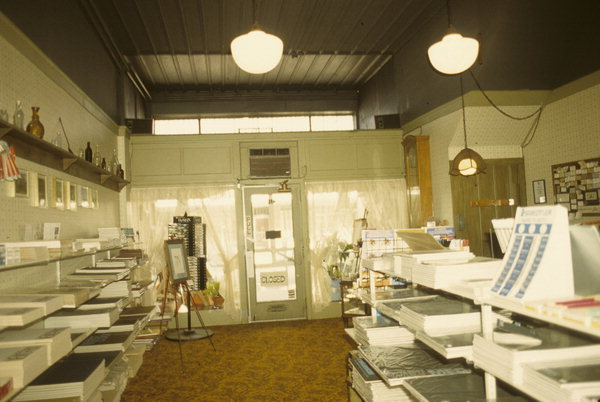
Interior of the building, 1980.

The Ode Record Center opened in the building that same year, and suffered a minor fire that December, which caused $600 worth of damage. It was succeeded by Furhman's Sausage & Cheese Shop, which held its grand opening on October 21, 1949. This store became Milton Keller's Sausage & Cheese in 1954, which was replaced by Gompers Millinery in 1956, and then by Seymour Smart Footwear in 1958. This shoe store was run by its sole proprietor, Gerald Lynch, until his death in 1973, after which the store closed. The Port Gilbert Gifts & Antiques Shop occupied the space from 1974 to August 1976, and was replaced within a week by Sixth Street Art Supply. The building's current first-floor tenant, The Cobblestone Ltd., is a frame shop and art gallery that opened around 1980. The second floor is occupied by the Dick Shore Dance Studio.
