= Weatherson =

Weatherson is a surname. Notable people with the surname include:

- Brian Weatherson (fl. from 1998), Professor of Philosophy at the University of Michigan
- Peter Weatherson (born 1980), English footballer

== See also ==
- Weatherston
