= Murder of Nabra Hassanen =

2017 murder and rape of American teenager

- Nabra Hassanen

- Murder of Nabra Hassanen (Virginia) Murder of Nabra Hassanen (the United States)
- Location: Sterling, Virginia, U.S.
- Date: June 18, 2017; 3 a.m. – 4 a.m. (UTC−04:00)
- Attack type: Child murder by bludgeoning, child rape, child abduction
- Weapon: Baseball bat
- Victim: Nabra Hassanen
- Perpetrator: Darwin Martinez Torres
- Motive: Road rage (police claim), rape
- Charges: Second-degree murder (upgraded to capital murder)
- Verdict: Pleaded guilty
- Convictions: Capital murder in the commission of abduction; Capital murder in the commission of rape (3 counts); Abduction; Rape (3 counts)
- Sentence: 8 consecutive life sentences without the possibility of parole

On June 18, 2017, Nabra Hassanen, a 17-year-old American girl from Reston, Virginia, was raped and murdered. The killer was Darwin Martinez Torres, an illegal immigrant from El Salvador who was 22 at the time. He was indicted for Hassanen's rape and murder and subsequently pleaded guilty to four counts of capital murder, three counts of rape, and one count of abduction. In March 2019, he was sentenced to eight consecutive life sentences without the possibility of parole for the crimes. Police identified the murder as an apparent act of road rage, and not a hate crime.

== Events ==
Nabra Hassanen, a Muslim, was a sophomore at South Lakes High School in Reston, Virginia, ready to start her junior year in 2017. On June 18, 2017, during the month of Ramadan, Hassanen was with 15 teenage friends near the All Dulles Area Muslim Society (ADAMS) Center Mosque. The teens got some food from a nearby McDonald's and went back to the mosque between 3 a.m. and 4 a.m and got into "a dispute with a man driving a red car"; the man was later identified as Darwin Martinez Torres. They scattered as the man drove onto a curb. He then followed them to a parking lot, got out of the car and chased them. When the man managed to reach Hassanen, he hit her with a baseball bat and put her in the car. As Hassanen's friends ran back to the mosque, the man "drove off with her in his car", took her to a nearby location, and assaulted her again (details of the second assault were not revealed). After Hassanen died of "blunt force trauma to her upper body", the man dumped her in a pond near his home in Loudoun County, Virginia.

Initially, the incident was assumed by her family and religious community to be an anti-Muslim hate crime.

== Investigation ==
At 4 a.m. of the same day, Fairfax County, Virginia police started searching for the girl, whose body was found floating in a pond around 3 p.m. The police then noticed a suspicious car in the vicinity and arrested the driver, who was later charged with second-degree murder.

The day after the killing, the police stated on Twitter that "they are not investigating the attack as a hate crime". The County police spokeswoman said during a news conference that "it appears that the suspect became so enraged over this traffic argument that it escalated into deadly violence". Since the police believed the killing did not seem to be related by either race or religion, it was considered a road rage incident, rather than a hate crime-motivated offence. Fairfax County police chief Edwin Roessler Jr. told the media that they had "absolutely no evidence" showing the killing of Hassanen was caused by hate crime.

Police and prosecutors believe Hassanen was sexually assaulted by her abductor before she was killed.

=== The perpetrator ===
Darwin Martinez Torres, then aged 22, is an illegal immigrant to the United States from El Salvador who worked in construction. The U.S. Immigration and Customs Enforcement had no record of previous encounters with Torres prior to Hassanen's killing.

Several days before Hassanen's murder, a woman who was being treated in the emergency room of a hospital in Loudoun County told a representative of the County's Child Protective Services agency that Torres had punched, choked and sexually assaulted her; she also told the representative that Torres was a member of the international criminal gang MS-13. The woman declined to press charges against Torres, and Fairfax County police said that they had found no "credible information" that Torres had been affiliated with the MS-13 drug gang.

== Trial ==
On October 16, 2017, a Fairfax County grand jury indicted Torres on eight counts including capital murder and rape. Prosecutors there sought the death penalty.

Defense attorneys for the accused filed a neuropsychological report that stated Torres was "likely intellectually disabled" and further evaluations should be held to determine whether he had the mental capacity to face the death penalty. The motion was filed in May 2018, and listed issues such as significant cognitive limitations, poor memory, severely impaired judgement, and functional illiteracy. A separate motion for monthly motion hearings was filed in April by the attorneys, saying the accused had difficulty following the legal arguments.

In November 2018, Torres pleaded guilty to multiple charges, including capital murder, in exchange for being spared possible execution. He was sentenced to eight life terms without parole on March 28, 2019.

== Reaction ==
The ADAMS Center Mosque told the public in a statement that the community was devastated by the killing, saying "it is a time for us to come together to pray and care for our youth." On the Internet, some people expressed their outrage by criticizing the decision by police not to look into the killing as a hate crime. Isabella Burton of Vox wrote: "Hassanen has become another example of an innocent victim of Islamophobia."

On June 20, Washington D.C. residents gathered at the city's park Dupont Circle commemorating Hassanen's death. A 24-year-old man attempted to set fire to a fountain where the memorial took place and was arrested for vandalism. A sergeant later said there was no permanent damage found on the fountain and the police were not sure why the man was around. On June 21, thousands attended a vigil to celebrate Hassanen's life and mourn her death at Lake Anne Village Center in Reston.

At a preliminary hearing for the accused in October 2017, supporters and friends of the victim staged a protest outside of the Fairfax County Courthouse. Friends and family honored Hassanen's 18th birthday by taking part in a charity event and giving back to others. In November 2018, Gadeir Abbas, NAML and Council on American–Islamic Relations said they expected Torres to receive a life sentence without parole.

=== Questioning nature of crime ===
Around 5,000 mourners attended Hassanen's funeral on June 21 and caused a traffic jam. While the majority of the attendees were Muslims, Christians and Jews were also in attendance.

Hassanen's father, Mohmoud Hassanen Aboras, was one of many Muslims who believed his daughter was killed because of her religion – when Hassanen was abducted, she was dressed in a Muslim robe known as abaya. A lawyer with CAIR said "Muslim Americans are particularly fearful now."
