= 4th Street Bridge (Racine, Wisconsin) =

- Coordinates: 42°43′45″N 87°47′07″W
- Crosses: Root River
- Locale: Racine, Wisconsin
- Maintained by: State of Wisconsin

Characteristics
- Design: Swing bridge

History
- Opened: March 1878
- Closed: January 18, 1936 (vehicles); September 14, 1961 (pedestrians)

Location
- Interactive map of 4th Street Bridge

The 4th Street Bridge was a bridge in Racine, Wisconsin that connected 4th Street to Bridge Street across the Root River. The first bridge on the site was built in 1844, and was replaced in 1857 and 1878. The most recent incarnation of the bridge was a swing bridge built in 1878. The last 19th-century bridge to continue operating in Racine, the city considered removing or replacing it for decades, particularly after an inspection in 1921 found the bridge to be in poor condition. Due to safety concerns, the bridge was closed to vehicle traffic in 1936, but remained open to pedestrians until it was condemned in 1961, and subsequently demolished in 1963. In recent years, a new pedestrian bridge has been proposed to be built at the same location.

== History ==
The first bridge to cross the Root River at 4th Street was a fixed pile bridge constructed by Sidney and Stephen Sage in 1844, which was known as "Sage's Bridge". The bridge's construction was authorized by act of the state legislature on January 20, 1844. Because it was a low-lying pile bridge, it became the Root River's head of navigation. While originally a private structure, the bridge was extensively repaired by a city-owned dredge boat between 1849 and 1853, requiring part of the bridge to be briefly removed so the dredge could access the south side of the structure. In November 1856, the city of Racine hired Harper & Tweeddale of Chicago to replace Sage's Bridge and the "Red Bridge" at State and 2nd streets with two new nearly-identical wooden-truss swing bridges which were built in 1857. The new bridge at 4th Street was 135 feet (41 m) long and 27 feet (8.2 m) wide.

A committee organized by the city council in 1877 found the bridge to be "in very unsafe condition" and recommended that it be repaired immediately, predicting that it would cost $2,700 to make the bridge usable for three or four more years. The council decided to have the bridge completely replaced instead, and F. S. Illsley and Company was contracted to build a new steel bridge for $6,647.87. Since the bridge also crossed the Western Union Railroad tracks that followed the east bank of the river, the railroad paid for the new bridge to be built higher than the old one, since the old bridge was so low that it had posed a hazard to railroad employees. The new bridge was finished in March 1878.

When a new streetcar line was proposed in 1920, the city council readily agreed that the 4th Street bridge was unable to carry the weight of the streetcars and needed replacing. An inspection in 1921 found that the bridge's steel I-beams were severely weakened and riddled with holes by exposure to the acidic smoke and exhaust from the railroad tracks below. The beams were bolstered with timber as a temporary measure, and the city planned to replace the bridge as soon as the new State Street Bridge was finished.

In 1931, the Racine Journal-News described the bridge as "the oldest city structure still in service" and "the only survivor of pioneer Racine" after the old Racine County Courthouse was demolished. The bridge was narrowly saved from destruction in the early hours of March 4, 1933, when its wooden support structure caught fire. A gale on January 28, 1934, caused significant damage to the bridge's eastern approach.

On January 18, 1936, the bridge was closed to vehicles by order of Mayor William Swoboda. At the time, the pedestrian sidewalk was being repaired, so it was in good enough condition that it was kept open. Later that year, the city pushed for funding from the Public Works Administration to replace the bridge with a new bascule bridge. The PWA was able to cover 45 percent of the $350,000 cost of the new bridge, but in the midst of the Great Depression, the city of Racine was uncomfortable with paying the majority of the cost. Another proposal in 1938 suggested building an $850,000 viaduct connecting Grand Avenue to Douglas Avenue, which would have been built with state and federal funding so that the city would be expected to pay less than $100,000, as a replacement for the 4th Street bridge which would then be demolished. A referendum to issue $150,000 in bonds to fund the construction of a new bridge at 4th Street failed in April 1940.

In 1945, Bridge Street and its surrounding streets were vacated by the city of Racine as public streets and sold to the J.I. Case Company, which owned all the surrounding property. With the western end of the bridge closed to public motor traffic, the question of replacing the bridge to accommodate vehicles again became effectively moot. The city council considered removing the bridge in 1957, but decided not to after a traffic commission study found that over 400 pedestrians crossed the bridge each day.

In July 1961, Mayor Jack H. Humble urged the city council to have the bridge repaired or demolished. By that time, the Racine Journal Times reported, the swing mechanism was inoperable, the frame was rusted, and the wooden floor was rotted through in some places, creating holes that were patched with old traffic signs. On September 11, 1961, while the issue was being considered, Peter F. Lee dislocated his shoulder when his foot broke through a rotten plank on the bridge, and he later sued the city for the costs of his treatment. Humble ordered the bridge closed to pedestrians on September 14, after the City Harbor Commission described it as unsafe and noted that the city was liable for injuries sustained on the bridge.

The disused bridge was ultimately demolished two years later. Luedtke Engineering Company of Frankfort, Michigan handled the demolition during late July and early August 1963. On August 5, Luedtke Engineering employee Ronald Getchell was hospitalized after he fell from a dredge while working on demolishing the bridge. The Racine city council originally planned to replace the demolished bridge with a smaller pedestrian bridge to be built in 1964, but decided not to replace the bridge at all in an October 1963 budget meeting.

In 2012, the Racine city council approved "RootWorks: Root River Corridor Redevelopment Plan", which called for a new pedestrian bridge to be built at 4th Street, connecting Downtown to the Case New Holland campus and a new development called "River Loop North". Vandewalle & Associates unveiled plans for such a bridge in 2015.
