= Tom Weatherston =

American Republican politician, former member of the Wisconsin Assembly

Thomas Weatherston

Member of the Wisconsin State Assembly from the 62nd district
- In office January 7, 2013 – January 7, 2019
- Preceded by: Cory Mason
- Succeeded by: Robert Wittke

Member of the Caledonia, Wisconsin Board of Trustees
- Incumbent
- Assumed office April 2019
- Preceded by: Jay Benkowski
- In office 2010–2013

Personal details
- Born: February 15, 1950 (age 76) Buffalo, New York, U.S.
- Party: Republican
- Spouse: April
- Children: 1
- Education: Erie Community College; Buffalo State College
- Profession: Engineer

Military service
- Allegiance: United States
- Branch/service: United States Air Force
- Years of service: 1968–1972
- Battles/wars: Vietnam War

Tom Weatherston (born February 15, 1950) is an American industrial engineer and Republican politician. He served in the Wisconsin State Assembly from 2013 through 2019, representing the northern half of Racine County.

== Early life ==
Born in Buffalo, New York, Weatherston served in the United States Air Force as a civil engineer and was stationed in Vietnam during the Vietnam War. He went to Erie Community College, where he received an associate degree. He then graduated from Buffalo State College, where he received his bachelor's degree in industrial engineering. In 1977, Weatherston was hired by the Modine Manufacturing Company and moved to Racine, Wisconsin.

== Political career ==
In 2010, Weatherston was elected to the Caledonia, Wisconsin, Village Board of Trustees and served until 2013.

In November 2012, Weatherston was elected to the Wisconsin State Assembly in the newly redrawn 62nd Assembly District. He won re-election in 2014 and 2016 without opposition.

In 2017, Weatherston spearheaded the law proposal American Laws for American Courts banning Sharia in Wisconsin. It was criticised by the president of NAML, Asifa Quraishi-Landes, through statement "They see any acknowledgment of Sharia in American Muslim life as a first step to the Trojan Horse."

In April 2018, Weatherston announced that he would not seek re-election to a 4th term.

He instead ran to rejoin the Caledonia Village Board of Trustees in 2019. He defeated incumbent trustee Jay Benkowski in the April 2, 2019, spring general election.

Weatherston is a member of Vietnam Veterans of America Chapter 767 and Veterans of Foreign Wars Post 10301.

== Electoral history ==
Wisconsin Assembly, 62nd District Election, 2012
Party	Candidate	Votes	%	±%
Primary Election
Republican	Tom Weatherston	5,775	76.88%	
Democratic	Melissa Lemke	1,202	16.00%	
Democratic	Randy Bryce	522	6.95%	
	Write-ins	27	0.09%	
Total votes		'1,039'	'100.0%'	
General Election
Republican	Tom Weatherston	17,045	53.05%	
Democratic	Melissa Lemke	15,054	46.85%	
	Write-ins	31	0.10%	
Total votes		'32,130'	'100.0%'	+65.29%
Republican gain from Democratic				

Wisconsin Assembly, 62nd District Election, 2014
Party	Candidate	Votes	%	±%
Primary Election
Republican	Tom Weatherston	4,093	98.94%	
	Write-ins	44	1.06%	
Total votes		'4,137'	'100.0%'	
General Election
Republican	Tom Weatherston	18,761	97.61%	
	Write-ins	460	2.39%	
Total votes		'19,221'	'100.0%'	-40.18%
Republican hold				

Wisconsin Assembly, 62nd District Election, 2016
Party	Candidate	Votes	%	±%
Primary Election
Republican	Tom Weatherston	5,209	99.77%	
	Write-ins	12	0.23%	
Total votes		'5,221'	'100.0%'	
General Election
Republican	Tom Weatherston	22,523	100.0%	
Total votes		'22,523'	'100.0%'	+17.18%
Republican hold				

Caledonia Village Trustee 1 Election, 2019
Party	Candidate	Votes	%	±%
General Election, April 2, 2019
Independent	Tom Weatherston	2,554	51.08%	
Independent	Jay Benkowski (incumbent)	2,434	48.68%	
	Write-ins	12	0.24%	
Total votes		'5,000'	'100.0%'	
