= YMCA Building (Racine, Wisconsin) =

- U.S. National Register of Historic Places
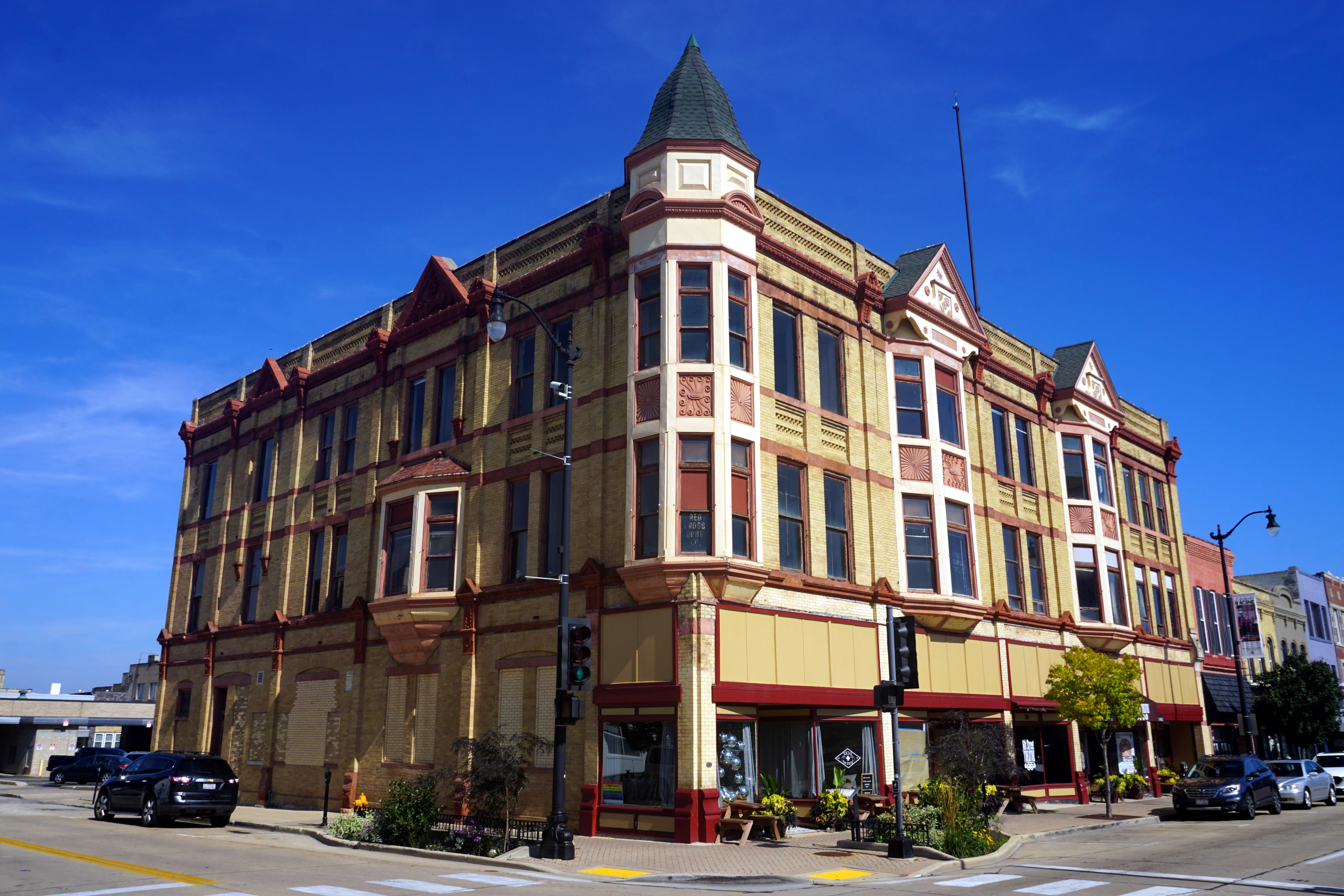
- YMCA Building
- Location: 314-320 6th St. Racine, Wisconsin
- Coordinates: 42.72686°N 87.78476°W
- Built: 1886
- Architect: James Gilbert Chandler
- Architectural style: Queen Anne
- NRHP reference No.: 82000703
- Added to NRHP: March 1, 1982

The YMCA Building is located in Racine, Wisconsin. It was added to the National Register of Historic Places in 1982. It was designed by James Gilbert Chandler.
