= Shoop Building =

- U.S. National Register of Historic Places
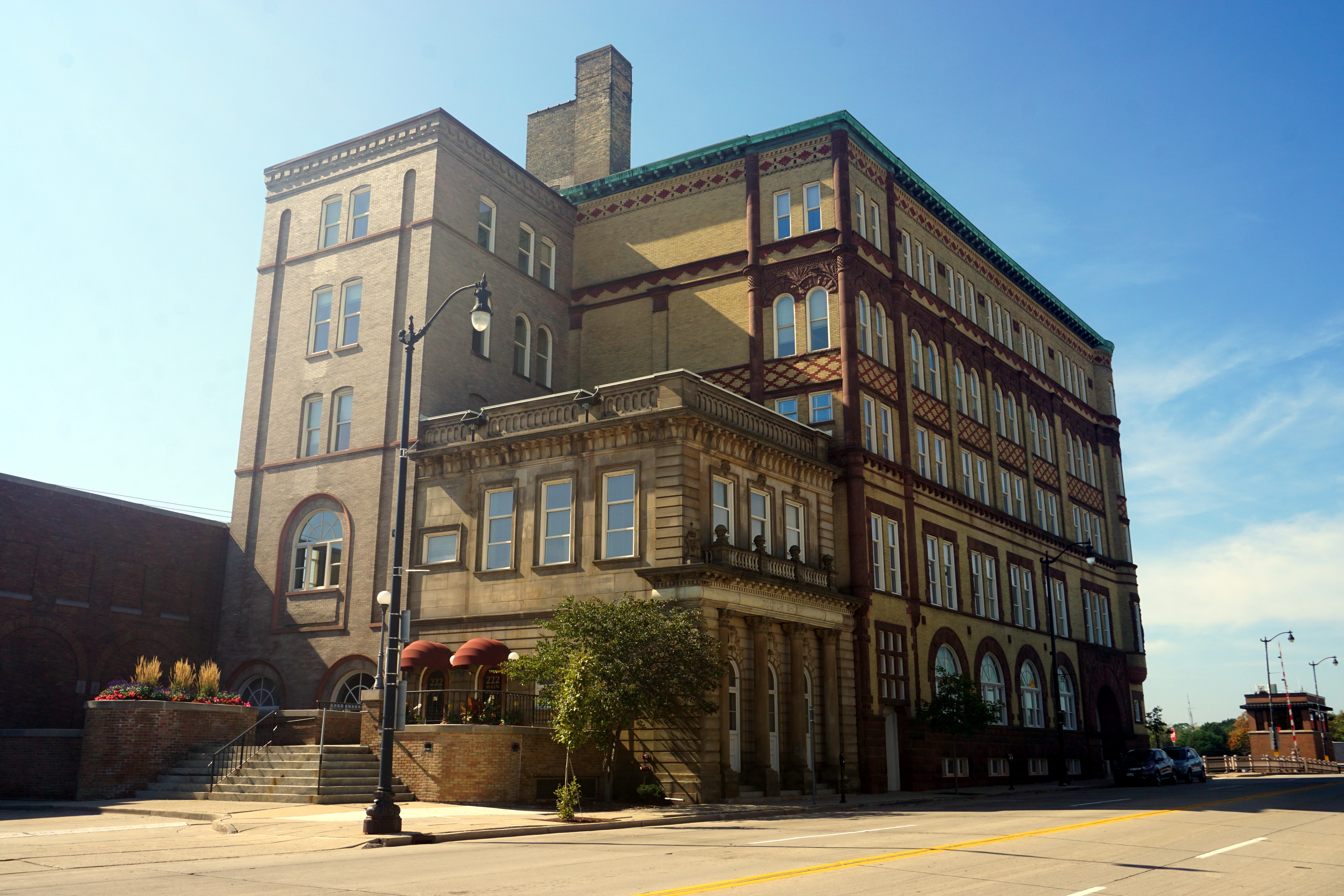
- Shoop Building

- Location within Wisconsin
- Location: 215 State St., Racine, Wisconsin
- Coordinates: 42.731389°N 87.784444°W
- Built: 1893
- Architect: James Gilbert Chandler
- Architectural style: Richardsonian Romanesque
- NRHP reference No.: 78000129
- Added to NRHP: April 26, 1978

The Shoop Building is a historic office building in downtown Racine, Wisconsin, U.S. Located next to the Root River at 215 State Street and 222 Main Street, its six-story height and contrast of Cream City brick and red sandstone make it a distinctive part of Racine's skyline. Constructed in stages between 1893 and 1902, the main part of the building was designed by local architect James Gilbert Chandler.

== History ==
Dr. Clarendon Shoop, a practicing physician in Racine, began selling his own patent medicines in 1890. The Shoop Family Medicine Company's business quickly outgrew its rented room on Main Street and, finding no sufficiently large spaces available, Shoop had plans drawn up for a five-story building. This building was designed by a local architect, James G. Chandler, in the Richardsonian Romanesque style. The first parts of the building, the basement and the lower two stories were constructed in 1893. For cost reasons, Shoop decided not to build the upper stories until space was needed. The building was thus finished in 1899, becoming the tallest building in Racine. Two major additions were made in 1902: a six-story annex along the south side and a two-story office and powerhouse in the Renaissance Classical style, also designed by Chandler, to the east side.

After the passage of the Pure Food and Drug Act in 1906, which regulated the claims made by pharmacists like Shoop, the company was forced to cut back production. By 1910, the Shoop laboratory's brand had been renamed Country Club Toilet Products, selling products under the lines: Country Club Toilet, Grecian Girl, Golf Girl, Min-u-et, Kathelee and Baby Love Talc. The rooms in the building were being rented to small companies like Western Publishing, which had previously printed labels for Shoop's products. After Shoop's retirement in 1914, Western Publishing took over the whole building and later expanded to the Driver Company buildings across the street.

After Western left for a purpose-built factory to the southwest in 1928, the building took on a wide variety of tenants. The Western Coil and Electric Company produced radios and pseudo-medical violet ray machines there during the 1920s. The building also temporarily housed the Post Office during the construction of its new building.

In 1978, the building was purchased by Sanford Tube Sales, Inc. An employee of this company discovered a gravestone that predated the building in the wall of the basement in 1983, although no remains were found there. After being used as an industrial factory for its entire lifespan, S. C. Johnson and Son purchased the building in 1983, modernizing and renovating it into an office building which opened for business in 1987, as well as cleaning the exterior for the first time in decades. S. C. Johnson used the building as a home for its Johnson Worldwide Associates division in the 1990s. The main tenant today is an office of the accountancy firm CliftonLarsonAllen.

== See also ==
- National Register of Historic Places listings in Racine County, Wisconsin
