= Racine County Courthouse =

- U.S. National Register of Historic Places
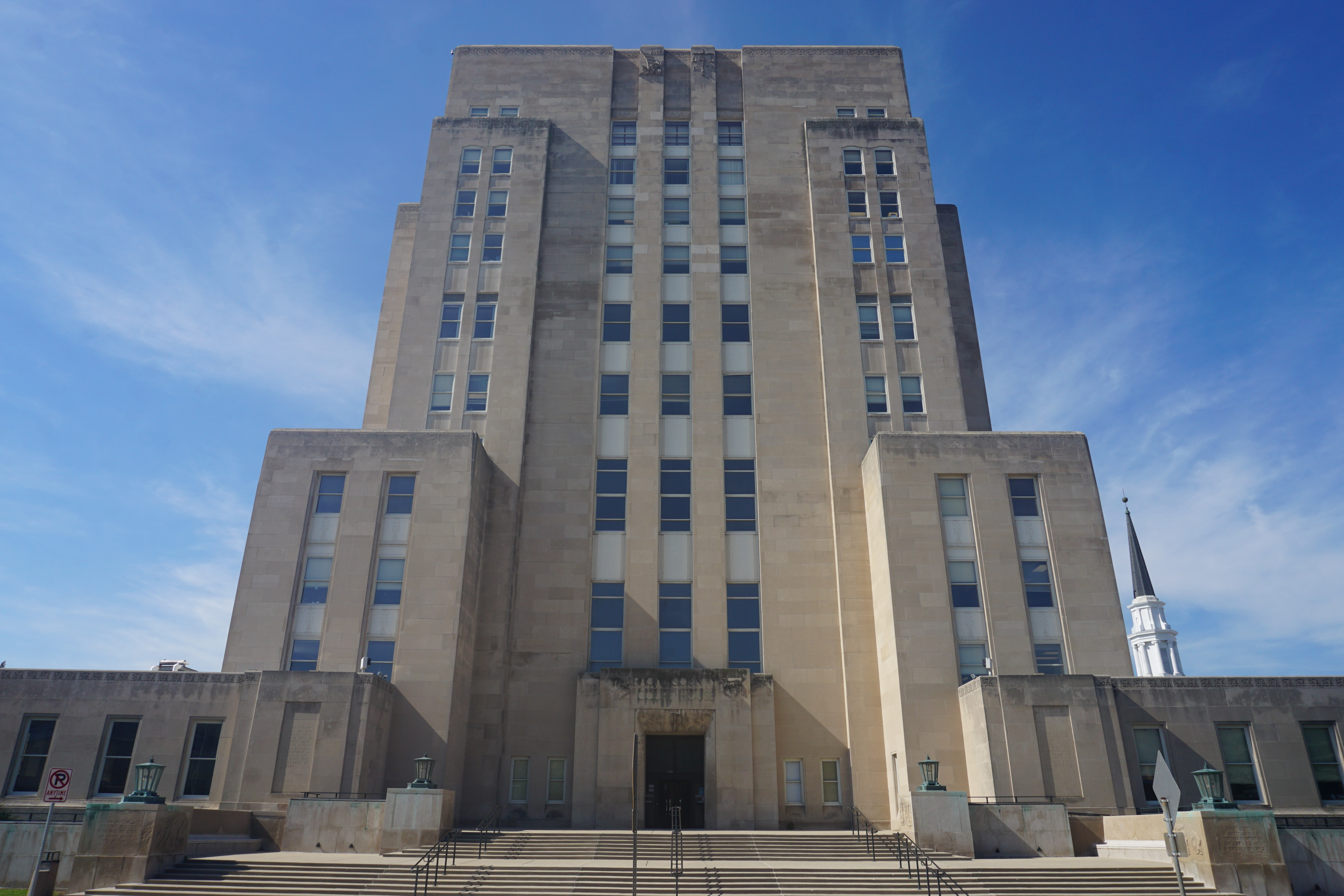

- Location within Wisconsin Location within the United States
- Location: 730 Wisconsin Ave., Racine, Wisconsin
- Coordinates: 42°43′31″N 87°47′04″W
- Area: 0.1 acres (0.040 ha)
- Built: 1931
- Architect: Holabird & Root
- Architectural style: Chicago School, Art Deco
- NRHP reference No.: 80000179
- Added to NRHP: July 28, 1980

The Racine County Courthouse is the seat of justice and county courthouse of Racine County, Wisconsin. The building is located at 730 Wisconsin Avenue, near downtown in the county's seat of Racine, Wisconsin. Built in 1930 and 1931 by the Chicago firm Holabird & Root, the Art Deco-styled building stands eleven stories tall and dominates the city's skyline. In addition to the county's judicial system, the building also houses the County Executive, whose office is on the tenth floor, and most of the offices for the county government. The courthouse was added to the National Register of Historic Places on July 28, 1980.

== History ==
The present courthouse is the third to serve Racine County. The first, constructed in 1839, was located in the town's market square, today known as Monument Square. Built in a Greek Revival style, the county building was intended to house "a court-house, a jail, and a building for county offices." Before it was removed in 1877, this building was moved into the middle of the square so that construction on a replacement could begin on the same site. The building was moved to the west side of town, where it became a fanning mill factory.

The second courthouse was designed by Henry C. Koch in a Second Empire style, and was completed in 1877. County officials proposed a replacement in 1911, which would have been designed by Bell, Tyrie & Chapman and occupied the same site, but this plan was controversial and was blocked by state statute in 1914. Instead, the courthouse was expanded with the addition of a third floor. Unlike its predecessor, the second courthouse was demolished after being replaced. During construction, the cornerstone of the building was moved to the current courthouse as a historical artifact.

Planning for the third and current courthouse started with the creation of a building fund in 1923. Construction began in 1928, when the county selected a full city block, bounded by Wisconsin and College Avenues and Seventh and Eighth Streets, and set it aside for a new county office. This location was the former site of Racine High School, which had closed earlier that year. Chicago architects John A. Holabird and John W. Root Jr. were chosen to design the building. The courthouse was one of three major civic construction projects that took place between 1930 and 1931, alongside Racine's new City Hall and a new post office. All three of these buildings opened during the same week in July 1931, in a county-wide "Dedication Week" celebration.

The Racine County Courthouse is the tallest building in Racine County, standing 157 feet above the street and 164 feet from the base of its ground floor. The building has eleven stories and a basement used for archival storage. Originally, the four uppermost floors were home to the Racine County Jail, and the basement the office of the Sheriff's Department, but both of these moved across the street to the Racine County Law Enforcement Center when it opened in 1982.

The relief sculptures on the building's walls were created by Carl Milles, in his first American commission. Architecturally, the building has also been noted for the relief sculptures on its bronze elevator doors.

== See also ==
National Register of Historic Places listings in Racine County, Wisconsin
