= Badger Building =

- U.S. National Register of Historic Places
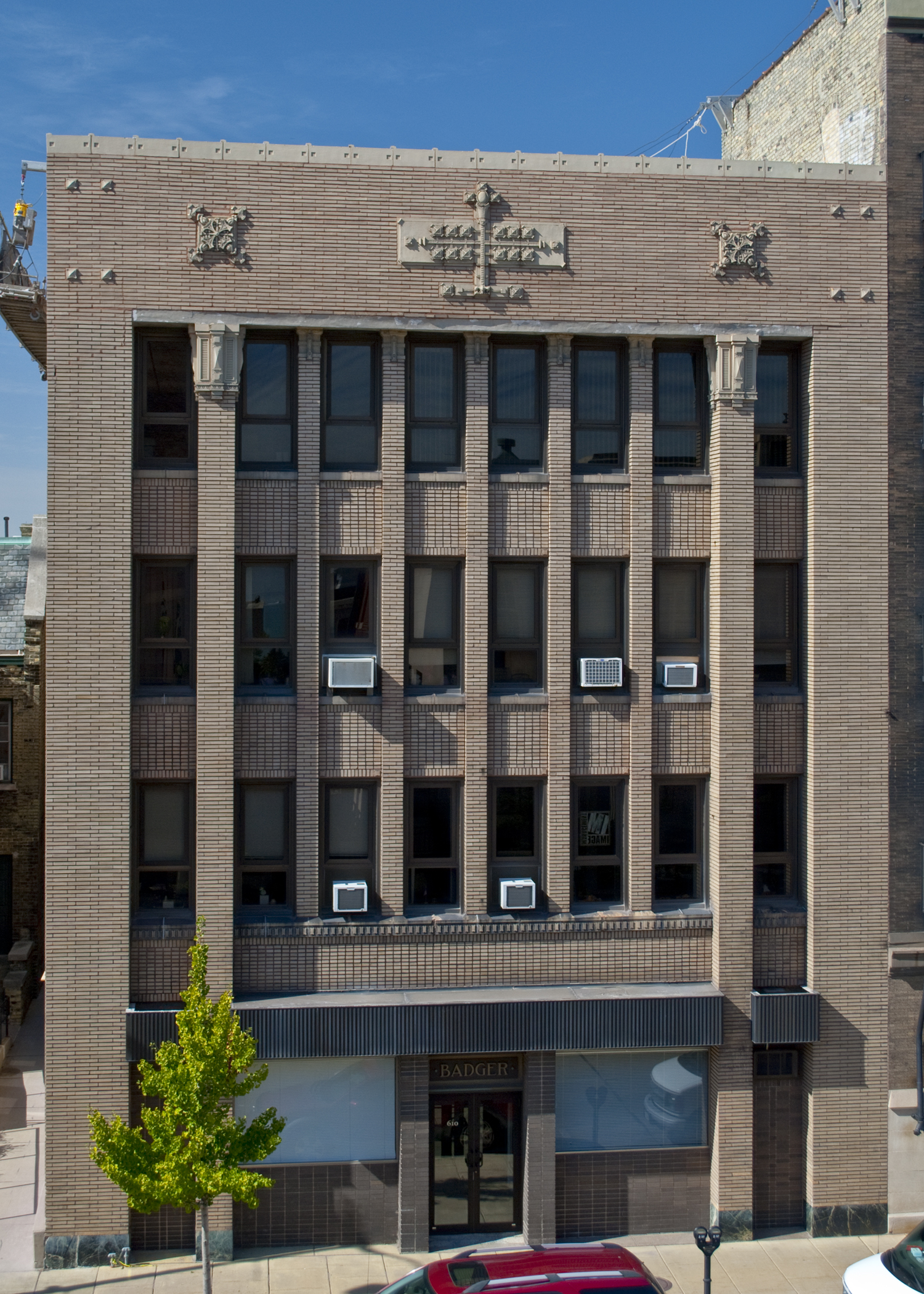

- Location within Wisconsin
- Location: 610 Main St., Racine, Wisconsin
- Coordinates: 42°43′36″N 87°46′58″W
- Area: 1.2 acres (0.49 ha)
- Architect: Edmund Bailey Funston
- Architectural style: Prairie School
- NRHP reference No.: 80000174
- Added to NRHP: December 3, 1980

The Badger Building, or M. Tidyman Building, is a historic office building in downtown Racine, Wisconsin. It is an example of Prairie style architecture, and was designed by prominent Racine architect Edmund Bailey Funston. The site was added to the National Register of Historic Places on December 3, 1980.

== History ==
The four-story brick and concrete structure was built in 1915, to house the Tidyman Candy Company, owned by confectioner Melvin Tidyman. At the time, the Racine Journal-News reported that its construction cost $55,000. During World War I, the building was used by the American Red Cross. It was purchased by attorney Joseph Muratore in 1964, and as of 2015 was owned by his son Joseph Jr. The building continues to be used primarily as office space, most prominently for graphic design firm Image Management. July 2021 the building was acquired by Badger Building LLC Proprietor Kenneth Brown. It is now the home of EYEopenerZ, an upscale optical boutique, owned and operated by Mr Brown. Some modern renovations to the front facade are planned to restore the 1915 original as current regulations allow, to create ADA accessibility. Completion expected Spring of 2025.

== See also ==
- National Register of Historic Places listings in Racine County, Wisconsin
