= James Gilbert Chandler =

American architect

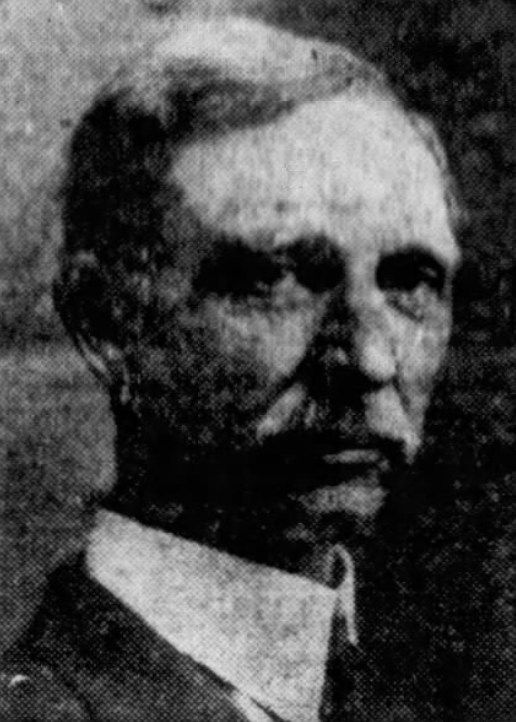
- Born: August 4, 1856; Berlin Falls, New Hampshire
- Died: January 17, 1924 (aged 67); Milwaukee, Wisconsin
- Occupation: Architect
- Spouse: Francis Mary Evans (m. 1885)
- Children: 4

James Gilbert Chandler (August 4, 1856 – January 17, 1924) was a prominent architect in Racine, Wisconsin.

== Personal life ==
Chandler was born at Berlin Falls, New Hampshire, on August 4, 1856, to Milton Walker Chandler and Sarah Grover Chandler. After attending school in Zumbrota, Minnesota, and Madison, Wisconsin, he studied architecture in Madison, and then started working as an architect in 1879. In 1885 he married Francis Mary Evans, with whom he had four children. He died on January 17, 1924, in Milwaukee, Wisconsin.

== Work ==
Chandler's firm was known as Chandler & Parks. He was involved in the design of several building listed on the National Register of Historic Places (NRHP). He designed the Shoop Building and the Racine YMCA (both NRHP listed). Chandler was in charge of remodeling and enlarging of all three of architect Lucas Bradley's Garfield schools.

== See also ==
- National Register of Historic Places listings in Racine County, Wisconsin
