= Edmund Bailey Funston =

American architect

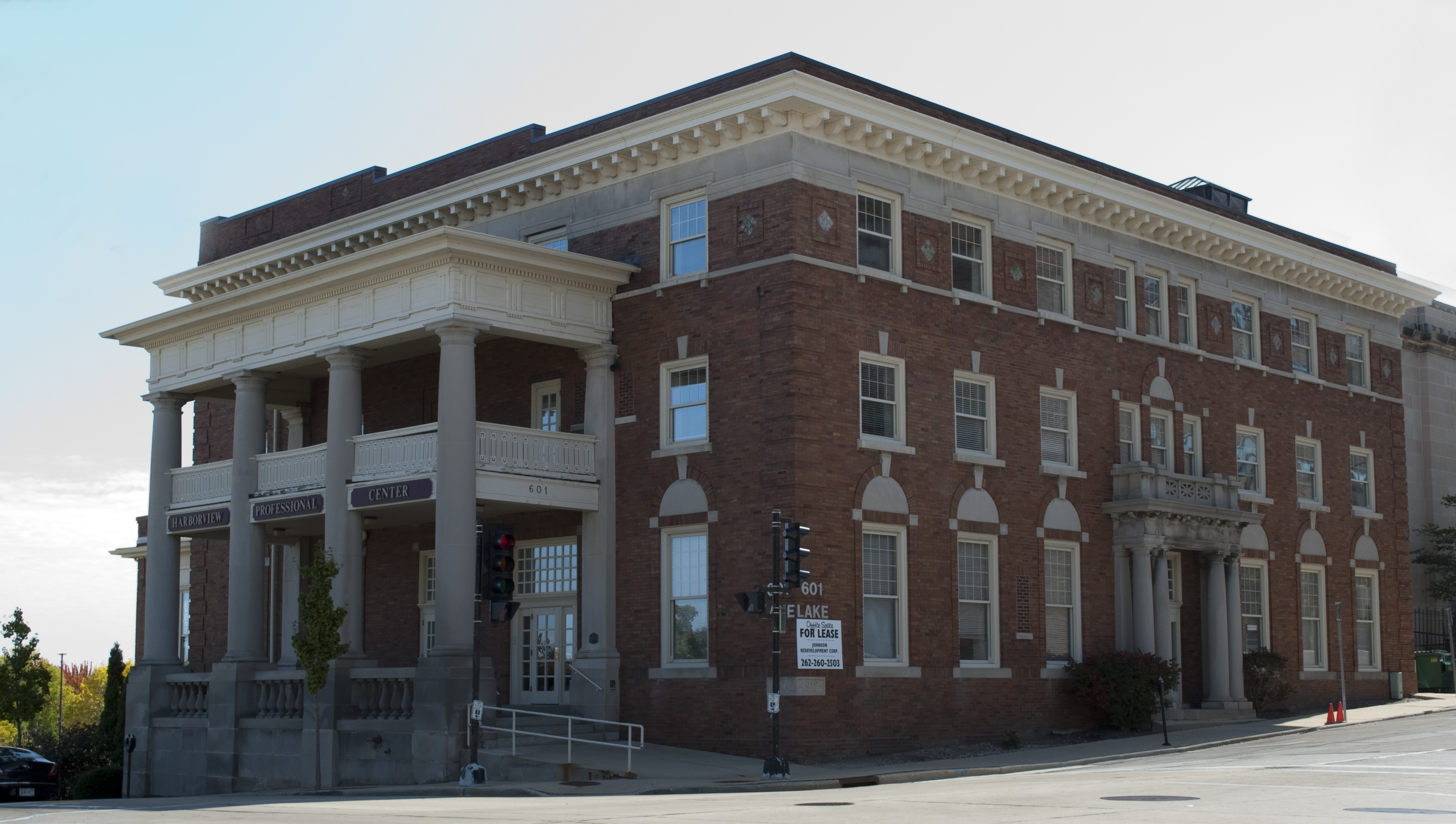
Racine Elks Club, Lodge No. 252 at 601 Lake Avenue in Racine, Wisconsin

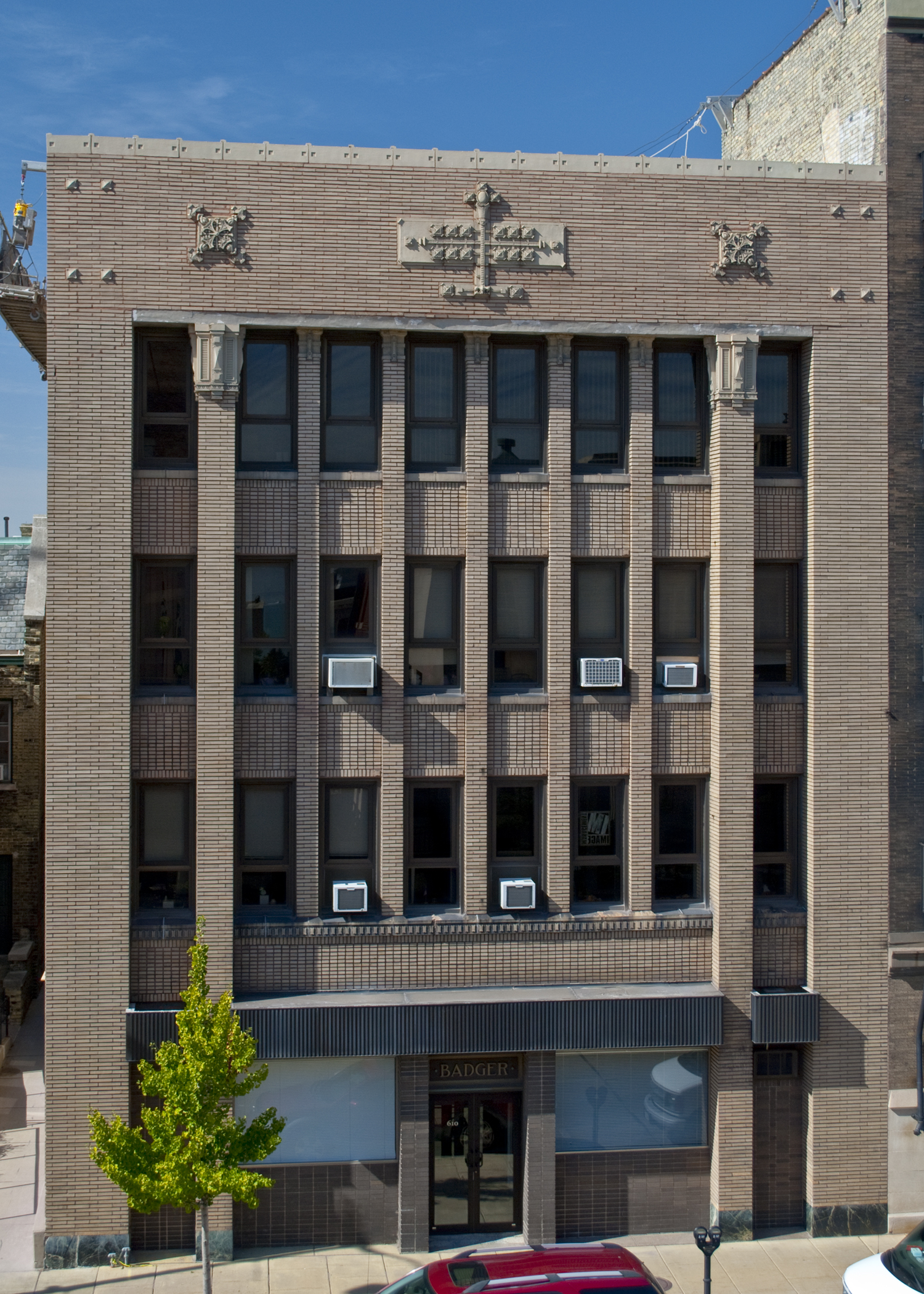
Badger Building

Edmund Bailey Funston (May 19, 1868 – May 10, 1933) was an American architect in Racine, Wisconsin. He is credited with designing the Badger Building (1916). He was the founder of Edmund B. Funston Company Architects. Funston was born in Champaign County, Illinois on May 19, 1868, to John H. Funston and Elizabeth E. (Bailey) Funston.

Funston graduated in 1892 with a Bachelor of Science architecture degree from the University of Illinois. He taught in a manual training school in Colorado for two years before working in New Orleans and Atlanta. He worked as superintendent of construction at Jos. C. Llewellyn of Chicago for five years, including work on the construction of five buildings at the University of Illinois. He also superintended the rebuilding of the Advance Threshing Machine Company's building in Battle Creek, Michigan.

Funston came to Racine and was associated with A. Arthur Guilbert as a partner from 1905 until 1915. The firm of Guilbert & Funston, Architects designed the Welsh Presbyterian church (Racine, Wisconsin), the First Methodist Church (Racine, Wisconsin), Grange Avenue Methodist Church, the First National Bank building, the Commercial & Savings Bank building, N. D. Fratt School, Elks club house (Racine, Wisconsin), Racine Country Club building, Fire engine houses Nos. 1 and 2, and an office building for the Mitchell-Lewis Motor Company.

After Guilbert & Funston dissolved in 1915, Funston organized the firm of Edmund B. Funston Company. P. T. Beicher was his assistant. In 1915-16 he oversaw the design and construction of the 4-story Badger office building. He also designed the manufacturing plant for the Hamilton Beach Manufacturing Company, remodeled the Masonic temple, and designed an office building for David B. James S. Company.

He founded the Funston Long Distance Telephone Company and constructed a telephone toll line from St. Joseph, Missouri east through Wisconsin. They acquired the control of the Missouri River Telephone Company and the Dakota Telephone & Electric Company, and Funston became president of all three.

Funston married Miss Ella M. Kephart of Ravenswood, Chicago, on August 23, 1905. Their daughter Jeanette was born November 27, 1915. Funston died at his residence in Coral Gables, Florida, on May 10, 1933.

== Bibliography ==
- Record of the Funston family: Seven generations, 1765-1925 including biographical sketches, family tree and selected quotations. Unknown Binding January 1, 1925
