= Henry Rohner =

American politician

Member of the Wisconsin State Assembly from the 63rd district
- In office January 1, 1973 – January 6, 1975
- Preceded by: District Created
- Succeeded by: Marcel Dandeneau

Member of the Racine County Board of Supervisors
- In office 1961–1966

Chairman of the Mount Pleasant Town Board
- In office 1961–1975

Personal details
- Born: September 7, 1919 Caledonia, Wisconsin, U.S.
- Died: August 2, 2006 (aged 86) Mount Pleasant, Wisconsin, U.S.
- Resting place: West Lawn Memorial Park; Mount Pleasant, Wisconsin
- Party: Republican
- Spouse: Marjorie E. Acklam
- Children: 4

Military service
- Allegiance: United States
- Branch/service: United States Navy
- Battles/wars: World War II

Henry Rohner (September 7, 1919 – August 2, 2006) was a public servant from Mount Pleasant, Wisconsin. He served one term in the Wisconsin State Assembly.

== Biography ==
Rohner was born in Caledonia, Wisconsin to Paul and Katherine (née Schraepfer) Rohner. He graduated from William Horlick High School in 1937. He worked as a tool-and-die maker for Belle City Malleable and the J.I. Case Company. On October 4, 1941, at Holy Innocents Episcopal Church, he married Marjorie E. Acklam.

During World War II, he enlisted and served in the United States Navy. After returning from the war, Rohner founded the Henry Rohner Implement Company and was a Ford Tractor and Equipment Dealer for over 23 years. He was also a member of the volunteer fire and rescue squad in Mount Pleasant, Wisconsin, and rose to the rank of Assistant Chief. He was a member of the American Legion, the Racine City Humane Society, and the United Auto Workers.

== Political career ==
Rohner's first public office was Mount Pleasant's Civil Defense Director, 1955 through 1961. He was also a member of the Mount Pleasant School Board from 1957 until its merger with the Racine School District in 1961.

In 1961, Rohner ran for and was elected to two offices—Racine County Supervisor and Mount Pleasant Town Chairman. He would remain on the Racine County Board until 1966, and would remain Town Chairman for 14 years, ending in 1975.

Rohner was elected to the Wisconsin State Assembly in 1972, as a Republican. He ran for re-election in 1974, but was defeated by Democrat Marcel Dandeneau of Caledonia.

== Death ==
Rohner died in his sleep, on August 2, 2006. He was survived by his wife, four children, eleven grandchildren, and ten great-grandchildren. He was interred at West Lawn Memorial Park, in Mount Pleasant, on August 4, 2006.

== Electoral history ==
Wisconsin 63rd District Assembly Election 1974
Party	Candidate	Votes	%	±%
Democratic	Marcel Dandeneau	6,613	57.58%	+9.93%
Republican	Henry Rohner (incumbent)	4,872	42.42%	
Total votes		'11,485'	'100.0%'	-36.00%
Democratic gain from Republican				

Wisconsin 63rd District Assembly Election 1972
Party	Candidate	Votes	%	±%
Republican	Henry Rohner	9,208	51.31%	
Democratic	John Siefert	8,551	47.65%	
American Independent	Joseph Yugo	187	1.04%	
Total votes		'17,946'	'100.0%'	
