= John E. Erickson (basketball) =

American basketball coach (1927–2020)

Personal information
- Born: June 19, 1927 Rockford, Illinois, U.S.
- Died: March 18, 2020 (aged 92) Tulsa, Oklahoma, U.S.

Career information
- High school: Rockford East (Rockford, Illinois)
- College: Beloit College (?–1949)
- Coaching career: 1955–1968

Career history

Coaching
- 1955-1958: Lake Forest College
- 1959-1968: University of Wisconsin

Career highlights
- First Beloit basketball player to score more than 1,000 career points

John Elmer Erickson (June 19, 1927 – March 18, 2020) was an American basketball coach and executive who was the first general manager of the Milwaukee Bucks of the National Basketball Association (NBA). He was the losing Republican candidate for the U.S. Senate in Wisconsin in 1970.

== Background ==
Erickson was born in Rockford, Illinois on June 19, 1927. He played on the Rockford East High School basketball and tennis teams. Erickson graduated from college in 1949 after being a Little All-American basketball player for Beloit College. He was the college's first player to score over 1000 points in a career that spanned three full seasons and two half seasons. He also represented the college for three National Collegiate Athletic Association (NCAA) tennis tournaments. Erickson died on March 18, 2020, at the age of 92 in Tulsa, Oklahoma.

== Career ==
After college, he coached high school basketball teams at Beloit, Wisconsin and Stevens Point, Wisconsin that advanced to the state competition. Erickson was drafted in 1953, serving for two years in the United States Army. He began coaching college basketball at Lake Forest College, compiling 34 wins and 38 losses for three seasons between 1955 and 1958. He served as an assistant coach for the University of Wisconsin–Madison for the 1958–59 season. The following year, he succeeded Bud Foster as head coach, and compiled a 100–114 record in nine seasons. His 1961 and 1962 teams finished second in the Big Ten Conference, the only times they would finish higher than fourth in Big Ten play from 1950 to 1998. His 1962 team upset an Ohio State team that was ranked number one at the time and led by Jerry Lucas and John Havlicek. He remained at Wisconsin until he was hired as the general manager of the Milwaukee Bucks expansion team on April 3, 1968.

After Erickson resigned as the general manager, he won the Republican Party primary, but lost in his 1970 run for the United States Senate against incumbent William Proxmire.

After the loss, Erickson became president of the Fellowship of Christian Athletes, a position that he held for 15 years. The Big Eight Conference hired Erickson to be its director of basketball in 1988, a position that he held until he was promoted to be the assistant commissioner.

== Awards ==
Erickson is inducted in four halls of fame. He was inducted in the Lake Forest College hall of fame in 1989 and Beloit College's Hall of Honor in 1968.

== Head coaching record ==
Record table
Season	Team	Overall	Conference	Standing	Postseason
Lake Forest Foresters (College Conference of Illinois) (1955–1958)
1955–56	Lake Forest	14–9	7–7	5th	
1956–57	Lake Forest	7–17	3–11	7th	
1957–58	Lake Forest	13–12	8–6	3rd	
Lake Forest:		34–38	18–24		
Wisconsin Badgers (Big Ten Conference) (1959–1968)
1959–60	Wisconsin	8–16	4–10	9th	
1960–61	Wisconsin	7–17	4–10	8th	
1961–62	Wisconsin	17–7	10–4	2nd	
1962–63	Wisconsin	14–10	7–7	6th	
1963–64	Wisconsin	8–16	2–12	10th	
1964–65	Wisconsin	9–13	4–10	8th	
1965–66	Wisconsin	11–13	6–8	7th	
1966–67	Wisconsin	13–11	8–6	4th	
1967–68	Wisconsin	13–11	7–7	5th	
Wisconsin:		100–114	52–74		
Total:		134–152			

Party political offices
Preceded by Wilbur N. Renk	Republican nominee for U.S. Senator from Wisconsin (Class 1); 1970	Succeeded by Stanley York
