= 1982 United States Senate election in Wisconsin =

- November 2, 1982
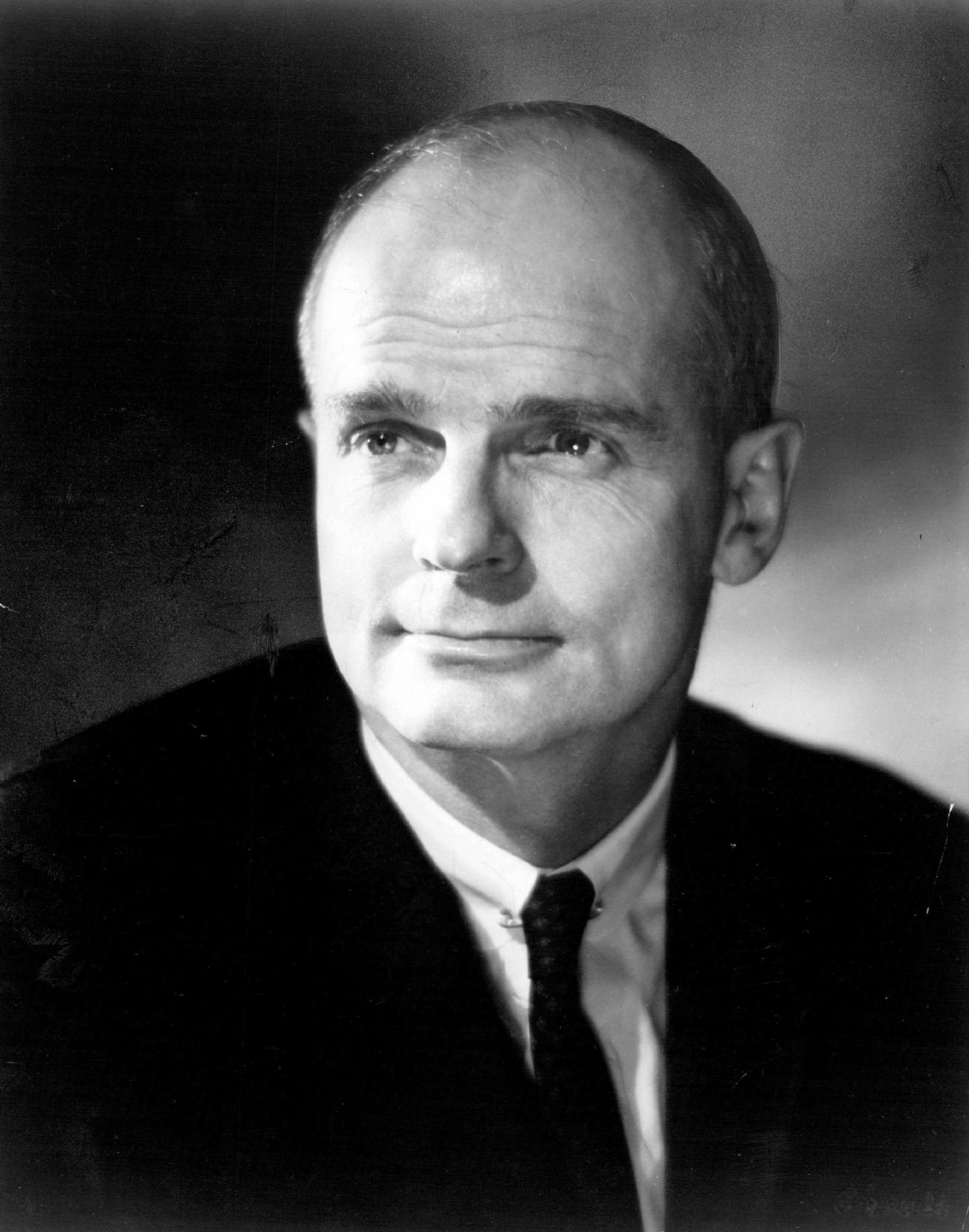

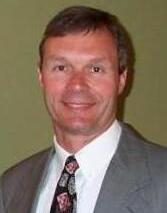
| Nominee | William Proxmire | Scott McCallum |
| Party | Democratic | Republican |
| Popular vote | 983,311 | 527,355 |
| Percentage | 63.65% | 34.14% |
- County results Proxmire: 40–50% 50–60% 60–70% 70–80% 80–90% McCallum: 50–60%
U.S. senator before election
William Proxmire
Democratic
Elected U.S. Senator
William Proxmire
Democratic

The 1982 United States Senate election in Wisconsin was held on November 2, 1982. Incumbent Democrat William Proxmire defeated Republican nominee, future Lieutenant Governor and Governor Scott McCallum in a landslide, taking 63.65% of the vote to McCallum's 34.14%.

Primary elections were held on September 14, 1982.

== Democratic primary ==
=== Candidates ===
- Marcel Dandeneau, former State Representative from Caledonia
- William Proxmire, incumbent Senator since 1957

=== Results ===
Democratic primary results
| Party | Candidate | Votes | % |
|---|---|---|---|
| Democratic | William Proxmire (incumbent) | 467,214 | 86.12 |
| Democratic | Marcel Dandeneau | 75,258 | 13.87 |
| Total votes | | 542,527 | 100.00 |

== Republican primary ==
=== Candidates ===
- Paul T. Brewer
- Scott McCallum, State Representative from Lodi

=== Results ===
Republican primary results
| Party | Candidate | Votes | % |
|---|---|---|---|
| Republican | Scott McCallum | 182,043 | 67.71 |
| Republican | Paul T. Brewer | 86,728 | 32.26 |
| Total votes | | 268,771 | 100.00 |

== General election ==
=== Candidates ===
- William O. Hart (Independent)
- George Liljenfeldt (Libertarian)
- Sanford G. Knapp (Independent)
- Scott McCallum, State Representative from Lodi (Republican)
- William Proxmire, incumbent Senator since 1957 (Democratic)

=== Results ===
1982 United States Senate election in Wisconsin
| Party | Candidate | Votes | % | ±% |
|---|---|---|---|---|
| Democratic | William Proxmire (incumbent) | 983,311 | 63.65% | |
| Republican | Scott McCallum | 527,355 | 34.14% | |
| Independent | William O. Hart | 21,807 | 1.41% | |
| Libertarian | George Liljenfeldt | 7,947 | 0.51% | |
| Independent | Sanford G. Knapp | 4,463 | 0.29% | |
| Majority | | 455,956 | | |
| Turnout | | 1,544,981 | | |
| Democratic hold | | Swing | | |

== See also ==
- 1982 United States Senate elections
