= Sheri D. Sheppard =

American academic (born 1956)

- Born: 1956
- Education: University of Michigan
- Awards: U.S. Professors of the Year award
- Scientific career
- Fields: engineering design
- Workplaces: Stanford University

Sheri D. Sheppard (born 1956) is the Burton J. and Deedee McMurtry University Fellow in Undergraduate Education; Associate Vice Provost of Graduate Education; and Associate Chair for Undergraduate Curriculum, Mechanical Engineering, Stanford University. She focuses her teaching on engineering design for undergraduate and graduate students. In November 2014, the Carnegie Foundation bestowed on her the U.S. Professor of the Year award.

== Early life and education ==
Sheppard graduated from William Horlick High School in Racine, Wisconsin in 1974 and aimed to study law. As she explained, "...my father said that he would fund law school if I majored in engineering." She earned a B.S. in Engineering Mechanics from the University of Wisconsin–Madison in 1978, and by that time she had become passionate about engineering. She went to the University of Michigan–Dearborn, and earned an M.S. in Mechanical Engineering in 1980 and earned her Ph.D. in Mechanical Engineering from the University of Michigan–Ann Arbor in 1985.

== Career ==
Sheppard has held positions in Detroit, working at Chrysler Corporation and also at Ford Motor Company's Scientific Research Lab. She started at Stanford as an assistant professor on the Mechanical Engineering faculty in 1986. Sheppard was promoted to associate professor in 1993, and achieved the rank of professor in 2005. Sheppard was chair of Stanford's Faculty Senate from 2006 to 2007. Between 1999 and 2008, she also served as Senior Scholar at the Carnegie Foundation for the Advancement of Teaching, where she had responsibility for the Preparations for the Professions Program (PPP) engineering study and report.

== Research ==
Sheppard has studied fatigue and fracture of structural components, producing technical papers, reports, and textbooks on "weld fatigue and impact failures, fracture mechanics and applied finite element analysis." She has also led studies of engineering education, including the Carnegie Foundation for the Advancement of Teaching: Educating Engineers: Designing for the Future of the Field. Sheppard has been principal investigator on multiple National Science Foundation grants focused on engineer educational methods, including Synthesis Coalition (1986–1995), founding the Center for the Advancement of Engineering Education (2003–2009) and the National Center for Engineering Pathways to Innovation (2011–2016).

== Honors ==
In 2004, the American Society for Engineering Education presented Sheppard with the Chester F. Carlson Award, sponsored by Xerox, as an "innovator in engineering education who, by motivation and ability to extend beyond the accepted tradition, has made a significant contribution to the profession." Stanford University honored Sheppard in 2010 with the Walter J. Gores Award, "the University's highest award for excellence in teaching...the Gores Award celebrates achievement in educational activities that include lecturing, tutoring, advising, and discussion leading". In 2012 Sheppard received the Ralph Coats Roe Award from the American Society for Engineering Education, for "notable professional contributions". Sheppard received Stanford's 2014 President's Award for Excellence Through Diversity, "for serving as a trailblazing role model for women in engineering".

The Carnegie Foundation named Sheppard 2014 U.S. Professor of the Year, "for her innovative approach to teaching undergraduate students in a hands-on, problem-solving way that transforms large classes into small group learning laboratories".

She is a fellow of the American Society of Mechanical Engineering and the American Society for Engineering Education.
