= Dandeneau =

Dandeneau is a surname. Notable people with the surname include:

- Kady Dandeneau (born 1990), Canadian women's wheelchair basketball player
- Marcel Dandeneau (1931–2017), American educator and politician
