= Ahrndt =

Ahrndt is a surname. Notable people with the surname include:

- Ellen Ahrndt (1922–2009), American baseball player
- Jason Arhndt (born 1971), American professional wrestler
