= 1964 United States Senate election in Wisconsin =

- November 3, 1964
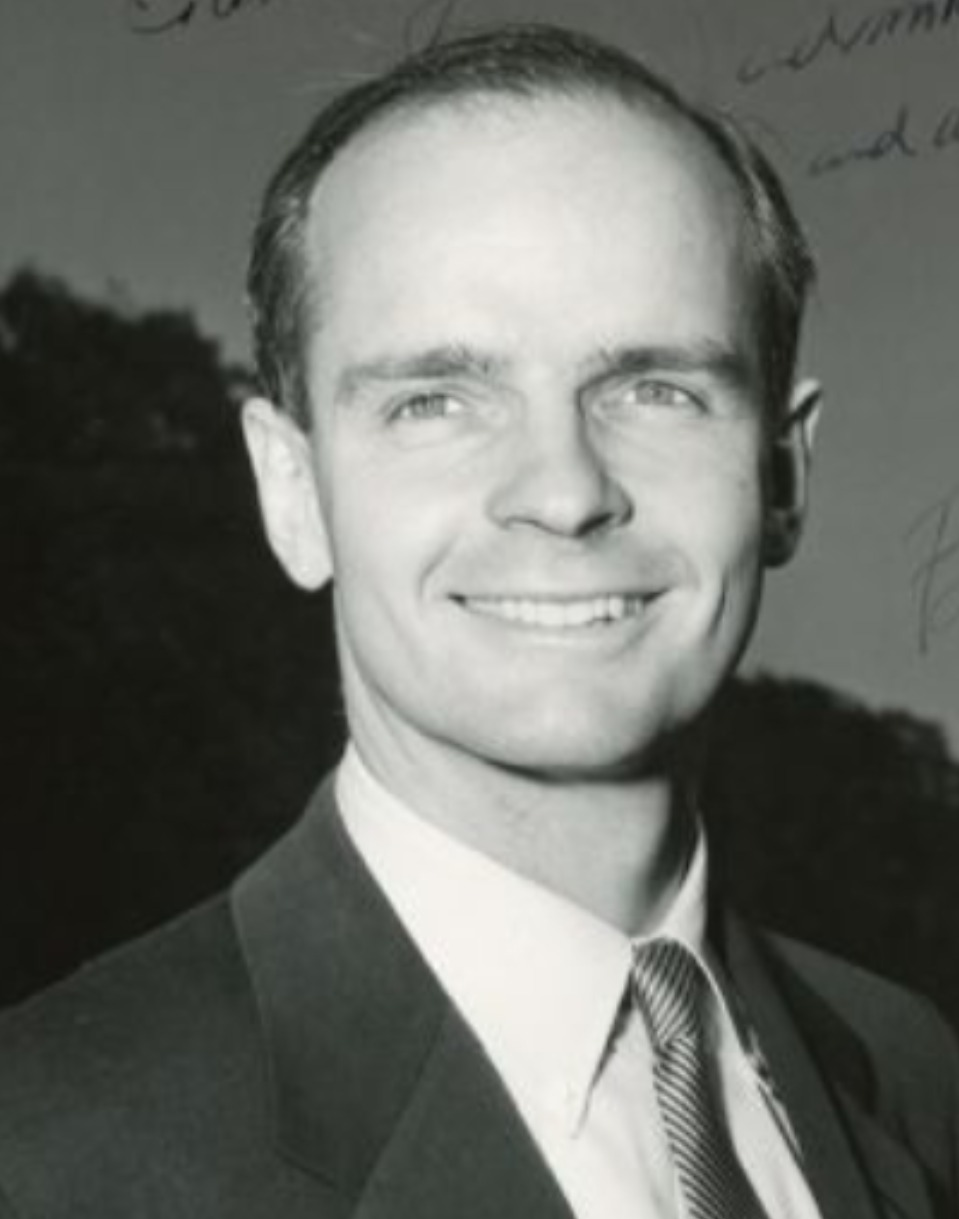

Nominee	William Proxmire	Wilbur N. Renk
Party	Democratic	Republican
Popular vote	892,013	780,116
Percentage	53.30%	46.61%
- County results Proxmire: 50–60% 60–70% 70–80% Renk: 50–60% 60–70%
U.S. senator before election
William Proxmire
Democratic
Elected U.S. Senator
William Proxmire
Democratic

The 1964 United States Senate election in Wisconsin was held on November 3, 1964. Incumbent Democrat William Proxmire was re-elected to a second full term in office over Republican Wilbur Renk.

== Democratic primary ==
=== Candidates ===
- Kenneth F. Klinkert
- William Proxmire, incumbent senator since 1957
- Arlyn F. Wollenburg

=== Results ===
1964 Democratic U.S. Senate primary
Party	Candidate	Votes	%
Democratic	William Proxmire (incumbent)	295,676	88.78%
Democratic	Kenneth F. Klinkert	20,022	6.01%
Democratic	Arlyn F. Wollenburg	17,333	5.21%
Total votes		333,031	100.00%

After losing the primary, Klinkert entered the general election as a candidate running on a "Faith and Belief in Man" ticket.

== Republican primary ==
=== Candidates ===
- Wilbur N. Renk, candidate for governor in 1962

=== Results ===
1964 Republican U.S. Senate primary
Party	Candidate	Votes	%
Republican	Wilbur N. Renk	300,258	100.00%
Total votes		300,258	100.00%

== General election ==
=== Candidates ===
- Wayne Leverenz (Socialist Workers)
- Kenneth F. Klinkert (Faith and Belief in Man)
- William Proxmire, incumbent Senator (Democratic)
- Wilbur N. Renk, candidate for governor in 1962 (Republican)

=== Results ===
1964 United States Senate election in Wisconsin
Party	Candidate	Votes	%	±%
Democratic	William Proxmire (incumbent)	892,013	53.30%	▼3.83
Republican	Wilbur N. Renk	780,116	46.61%	▲3.88
Independent	Kenneth F. Klinkert	1,062	0.06%	N/A
Socialist Workers	Wayne Leverenz	479	0.03%	▼0.07
Total votes		1,673,670	100.00%	
Democratic hold		Swing		

== See also ==
- 1964 United States Senate elections
