= 1970 United States Senate election in Wisconsin =

- November 3, 1970
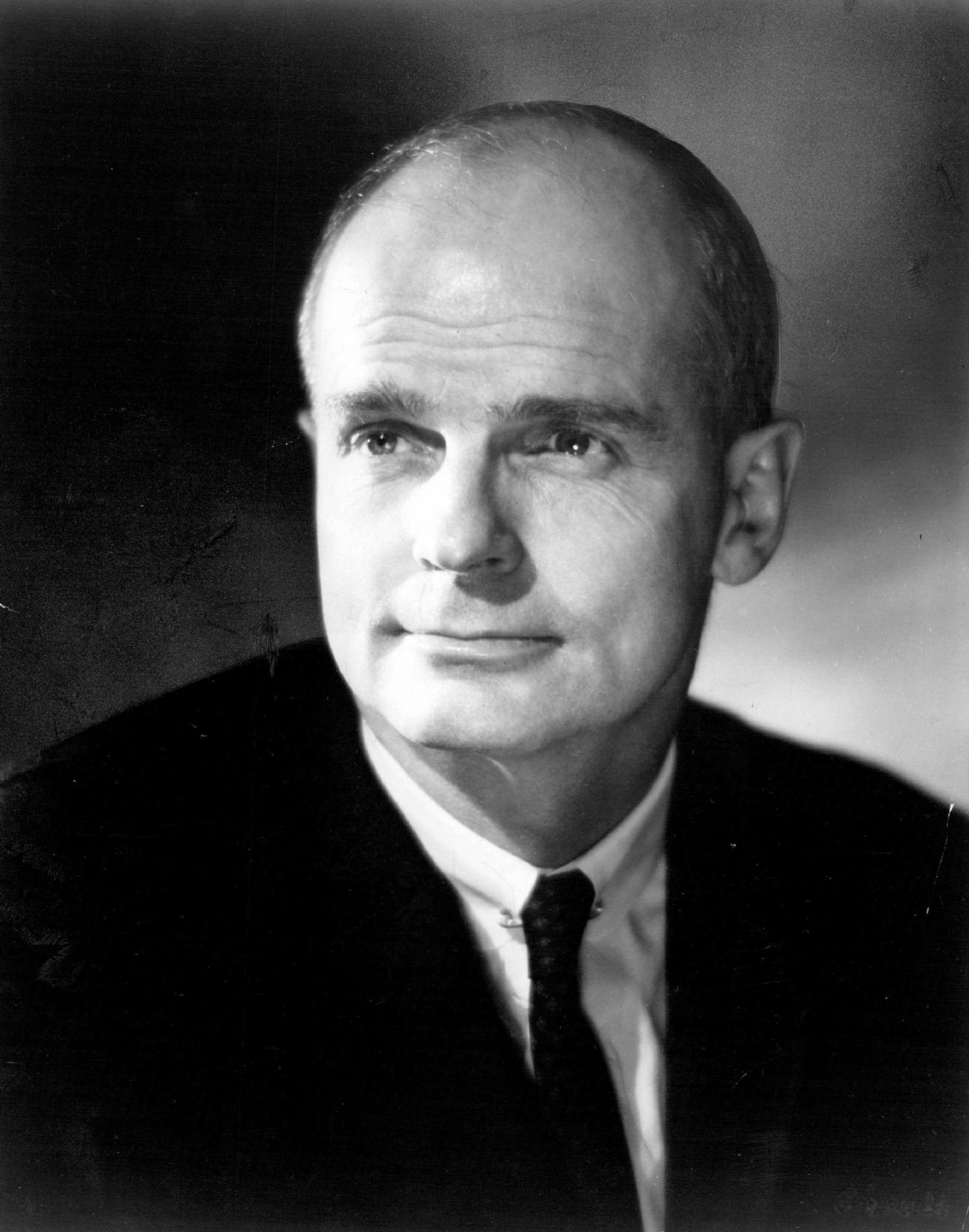

Nominee	William Proxmire	John E. Erickson
Party	Democratic	Republican
Popular vote	948,445	381,297
Percentage	70.83%	28.48%
- County results Proxmire: 50–60% 60–70% 70–80% 80–90%
U.S. senator before election
William Proxmire
Democratic
Elected U.S. Senator
William Proxmire
Democratic

The 1970 United States Senate election in Wisconsin was held on November 3, 1970. Incumbent Democrat William Proxmire was easily re-elected to a third full term in office over Republican John E. Erickson, taking more than 70% of the vote, and defeating Erickson by more than 42 percentage points.

== General election ==
=== Candidates ===
- Elizabeth "Betty" Boardman (Independent)
- John E. Erickson, general manager of the Milwaukee Bucks and former head coach of the Wisconsin Badgers men's basketball team (Republican)
- Edmond G. Hou-Seye, businessman (American Independent)
- William Proxmire, incumbent Senator (Democratic)
- Martha M. Quinn (Socialist Workers)
- Adolf Wiggert (Socialist Labor)

=== Results ===
1970 United States Senate election in Wisconsin
Party	Candidate	Votes	%	±%
Democratic	William Proxmire (incumbent)	948,445	70.83%	▲17.54
Republican	John E. Erickson	381,297	28.48%	▼18.13
American Independent	Edmond E. Hou-Seye	6,137	0.46%	N/A
Independent	Elizabeth Boardman	2,022	0.15%	N/A
Socialist Workers	Martha M. Quinn	580	0.04%	▲0.01
Socialist Labor	Adolf Wiggert	428	0.03%	N/A
None	Scattering	58	0.00%	▼0.01
Total votes		1,338,967	100.00%	
Democratic hold		Swing		

== See also ==
- 1970 United States Senate elections
