= Marcel Dandeneau =

20th century American politician

Chief Clerk of the Wisconsin State Assembly
- In office January 3, 1979 – January 5, 1981
- Preceded by: Everett E. Bolle
- Succeeded by: David Kedrowski

Member of the Wisconsin State Assembly from the 63rd district
- In office January 6, 1975 – January 3, 1979
- Preceded by: Henry Rohner
- Succeeded by: E. James Ladwig

Chairman of the Caledonia Town Board
- In office 1992–1995

Member of the Caledonia Town Board
- In office 1990–1992
- In office 1971–1977

Personal details
- Born: June 28, 1931 Racine, Wisconsin, U.S.
- Died: February 9, 2017 (aged 85) Caledonia, Wisconsin, U.S.
- Party: Democratic
- Spouse: Shirley Leach
- Children: 6
- Education: Dominican College of Racine BA, MS

Military service
- Allegiance: United States
- Branch/service: United States Army
- Years of service: 1951–1955
- Rank: Sergeant
- Battles/wars: Korean War

Marcel Dandeneau (June 28, 1931 – February 9, 2017) was an American educator and Democratic Party politician. He served two terms in the Wisconsin State Assembly, representing northern Racine County, and served as chief clerk of the Assembly during the 1979–1980 term. He also held local offices in Caledonia, Wisconsin.

== Biography ==
Born in Racine, Wisconsin, he was the eldest of six children born to Albert and Justine (née Breland) Dandeneau, both French Canadian immigrants.

Dandeneau graduated from St. Catherine's High School in Racine, Wisconsin. He served in the United States Army from 1951 to 1955. Dandeneau then received his bachelor's and master's degree from Dominican College of Racine and worked as a full-time teacher from 1960 through 1989, first at Sturtevant Grade School, then at Mitchell Junior High, where he taught English, History, and Science. He continued to work as a substitute teacher after his retirement in 1989.

He served on the board of supervisors for the town of Caledonia, Wisconsin from 1971 through 1977. From 1975 to 1979, Dandeneau served in the Wisconsin State Assembly. He then served as chief clerk of the Wisconsin Assembly from 1979 to 1981.

In 1975, Dandeneau was charged with misconduct in office, a felony, and violating state campaign laws in connection with unreported campaign contributions and vested interest in granting a liquor license. He was convicted of misdemeanor violation of campaign finance laws. Paid $500 fine and $10 court costs.

He was charged in 1976 with felony misconduct in public office. Case dismissed.

Dandeneau was re-elected to the Caledonia board of supervisors in 1990 and was chairman of the town board from 1992 to 1995. For the last 27 years of his life, Dandeneau held a monthly breakfast meeting for Racine politicians and businessmen to discuss the issues of the day.

Dandeneau died from cancer at his home in Caledonia, Wisconsin.

== Electoral history ==
=== Wisconsin Assembly (1974, 1976, 1978) ===
Wisconsin Assembly, 63rd District Election, 1974
Party	Candidate	Votes	%	±%
Primary Election, September 10, 1974
Democratic	Marcel Dandeneau	2,357	46.48%	
Democratic	John Siefert	2,161	42.61%	
Republican	Henry Rohner (incumbent)	553	10.91%	
Total votes		'5,071'	'100.0%'	
General Election, November 5, 1974
Democratic	Marcel Dandeneau	6,613	57.58%	
Republican	Henry Rohner (incumbent)	4,872	42.42%	
Total votes		'11,485'	'100.0%'	
Democratic gain from Republican				

Wisconsin Assembly, 63rd District Election, 1976
Party	Candidate	Votes	%	±%
Primary Election, September 14, 1976
Democratic	Marcel Dandeneau (incumbent)	2,294	34.79%	
Democratic	Robert N. Miller	1,993	30.23%	
Democratic	Daniel J. Nielsen	1,702	25.82%	
Republican	Herman V. Nelson	598	9.07%	
American	Eleanor Both	6	0.09%	
Total votes		'6,593'	'100.0%'	
General Election, November 2, 1976
Democratic	Marcel Dandeneau (incumbent)	12,657	62.14%	+4.56%
Republican	Herman V. Nelson	7,711	37.86%	
Total votes		'20,368'	'100.0%'	+77.34%
Democratic hold				

Wisconsin Assembly, 63rd District Election, 1978
Party	Candidate	Votes	%	±%
Primary Election, September 12, 1978
Democratic	Marcel Dandeneau (incumbent)	4,189	77.10%	
Republican	E. James Ladwig	1,244	22.90%	
Total votes		'5,433'	'100.0%'	
General Election, November 7, 1978
Republican	E. James Ladwig	8,242	53.31%	
Democratic	Marcel Dandeneau (incumbent)	7,219	46.69%	−15.45%
Total votes		'11,485'	'100.0%'	-24.09%
Republican gain from Democratic				

=== United States Senate (1982) ===
United States Senate Election in Wisconsin, 1982
Party	Candidate	Votes	%	±%
Primary Election, September 14, 1982
Democratic	William Proxmire (incumbent)	467,214	57.39%	
Republican	Scott McCallum	182,043	22.36%	
Republican	Paul Thomas Brewer	86,728	10.65%	
Democratic	Marcel Dandeneau	75,258	9.24%	
Libertarian	George Liljenfeldt	1,421	0.17%	
Constitution	Sanford G. Knapp	1,397	0.17%	
Total votes		'814,061'	'100.0%'	
General Election, November 2, 1982
Democratic	William Proxmire (incumbent)	983,311	63.65%	
Republican	Scott McCallum	527,355	34.14%	
Labor–Farm	William Osborne Hart	21,807	1.41%	
Libertarian	George Liljenfeldt	7,947	0.51%	
Constitution	Sanford G. Knapp	4,463	0.29%	
Total votes		'1,544,883'	'100.0%'	
Democratic hold				
