= Racine Unified School District =

School district in Wisconsin, United States

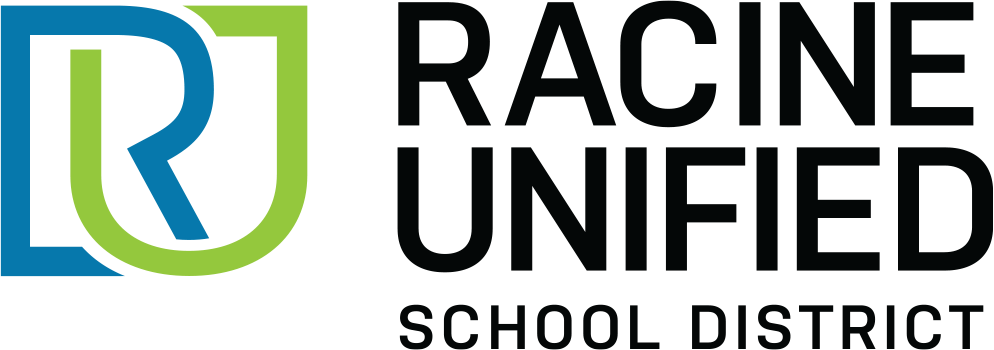

Address
- 3109 Mount Pleasant St Racine County, Wisconsin 53404; United States

District information
- Grades: PreK–12
- Superintendent: Soren Gajewski
- Schools: 23
- NCES District ID: 5512360

Students and staff
- Students: 15,781 (2024–25)
- Teachers: 1,187.40 (on an FTE basis)
- Student–teacher ratio: 13.29

Other information
- Website: www.rusd.org

Racine Unified School District (RUSD) is a school district serving the eastern portion of Racine County, Wisconsin. It encompasses a 100 sq mi (260 km^{2}) area, and serves the city of Racine and six other towns and villages, which had a combined population of 139,193 at the 2010 census. RUSD is the fifth-largest school district in Wisconsin. It has 20 schools, with a student enrollment of more than 16,000. The district employs 1,757 teachers and 171 administrators.

== History ==
On June 26, 1961, the City of Racine school system merged with 24 schools in the surrounding area to form the Unified School District No. 1 of Racine. The issue had been put to a referendum earlier that year, on April 4, and all seven municipalities of eastern Racine County – Caledonia, Elmwood Park, Mount Pleasant, North Bay, Racine, Sturtevant, and Wind Point – voted in favor of the unification. The district moved to desegregate its schools in 1975, in an effort which was regarded as widely successful and held up as a model to other cities. A pair of referendums in 2015 asked residents of Caledonia and Sturtevant whether they wanted to secede from RUSD and create separate school districts. Both narrowly won, garnering majority of the vote.

== Schools ==
Racine Unified operates 20 schools across eastern Racine County. One, the Bull Early Education Center, is a preschool serving children under the age of five. Five are elementary schools, educating children between four-year-old kindergarten and fifth grade. There are nine K–8 schools, for 4K through eighth grades; two 6–12 schools (grades 6–12); and three high schools, for ninth through twelfth grades.

=== Pre-K ===
- Bull Early Education Center - Formerly Bull Fine Arts Elementary School, which opened in 1971

=== Elementary schools ===
- Fratt Elementary School – Opened in 1916, the school's neighborhood area in west Racine straddles the Root River. The land for the school was donated posthumously by Nicholas D. Fratt, president of the First National Bank and Trust Company of Racine.
- S. C. Johnson Elementary School – The school, serving southwestern Racine, opened in 1955 and is named for Samuel C. Johnson, founder of S. C. Johnson & Son. Major additions were made to the building in 1960 and 1991. Additionally, children from downtown and the area immediately south are bussed to S. C. Johnson.
- Julian Thomas Elementary School – The school's neighborhood is immediately northwest of downtown. Originally opened in 1857 as the Fifth Ward grammar school, it was named Garfield School, after assassinated U.S. president James A. Garfield, from 1892 to 2003. After major renovations took place that year, it was renamed after local civil rights leader Julian Thomas.
- Knapp Elementary School – Serving the Slausondale neighborhood, the school opened in 2016. The new building replaced the original Knapp Elementary, which had been open since 1912 and was demolished after the opening of its replacement. The school's namesake is Gilbert Knapp, who founded Racine in 1835.
- Racine Early Education Center (REEC) – Opened in 2007, the REEC occupies the former home of the Keith R. Mack Alternative Center. The Center serves children between the ages of three and five.
- Wadewitz Elementary School – Originally intended as a school for students with special needs, the school opened in 1958 sharing a block with Horlick High School. Today Wadewitz is a neighborhood school, serving northwestern Racine, although a quarter of its students have special needs. The school's namesake is Edward Henry Wadewitz, founder of Western Publishing.

=== K–8 schools ===
- Olympia Brown K–8 School – Built in 2016, the newly constructed school serves eastern Caledonia. The former Olympia Brown building was purchased by RUSD in 1974 from the Racine Dominican Sisters. The school is named for Olympia Brown, a suffragist and women's rights activist who lived and worked in Racine.
  - The school moved from its previous Olympia Brown facility to the current one in 2016 and the REAL School moved out in 2017.
  - In the fall of 2025, a middle-school wing opened on the Brown campus, making the school a K–8 campus.
- Gifford K–8 School – Gifford is located in Franksville, an unincorporated community northwest of Racine. Its elementary boundary area of 46 sq mi (120 km^{2}) is the largest of any RUSD elementary school, encompassing most of Caledonia and nearly half of the district's land area. Originally constructed in 1966 as a junior high school, it was converted into an elementary school in 1984. A major expansion in 2016 turned it into a K–8 school, and it now serves about 1,300 students. Its athletics programs are known as the Gifford Gators. It was named after W. Allen Gifford, founder of Racine's Progressive Dairy.
- Gilmore K–8 Fine Arts School – Built in 1974, Gilmore is the neighborhood middle school for northwestern Racine. Additionally, students from northeastern Caledonia are bussed to Gilmore. Its athletics programs are known as the Gilmore Griffins. Gilmore is a Fine Arts choice school in RUSD.
- Goodland Montessori K–8 School – The first new school built by the Unified School District, Goodland opened in 1962, serving the west Racine neighborhoods of Manree Park and Crab Tree Village. Additionally, children from a poorer area immediately west of downtown are bussed to Goodland. It was named after Walter Goodland, governor of Wisconsin who had previously been mayor of Racine. In 2016, Goodland opened RUSD's first Montessori program, serving preschoolers between the ages of three and five. Goodland has now expanded by one grade each year and will grow until it serves 3K-eighth grade.
- Jerstad-Agerholm K–8 School – Built in 1952, the school serves northern Racine. Additionally, students from the area immediately north of downtown are bussed to Jerstad. It was named in honor of John L. "Jack" Jerstad and Harold C. Agerholm, two Racine natives who were killed in World War II and each received the Medal of Honor posthumously. Its athletics programs are known as the Jerstad Jaguars.
- Mitchell K–8 School – Mitchell K–8 School serves southern Racine and eastern Mount Pleasant. The building was constructed in 1937. On February 27, 2014, the building was damaged by fire, although the damage to the middle school was relatively light and class resumed the following week. The school was named for Henry Mitchell, founder of Mitchell-Lewis Motors and maker of Mitchell automobiles. Its athletics programs are known as the Mitchell Knights.
- Red Apple K–8 School – Opened in 1974, the school has a focus on sciences and STEM education and is one of the district's alternative education programs. It is a choice school, and has no neighborhood area. The oldest part of the building was constructed in 1875 as the Seventh Ward grammar school, which was expanded into Washington Elementary and Junior High in 1890. The elementary school closed in 1962, and the junior high school closed in 1966, leaving the building as one of RUSD's first ventures in alternative education, the Middle School Academy. Red Apple was founded in 1974 "as the Optional Elementary School... Principal Cheri Esch said a name change was necessary after the first year because the implication was that attendance was optional." Originally sharing its space with Walden III Middle/High School, Red Apple moved to the former Washington Elementary building in 1986. In February 2026, Red Apple moved into a brand-new facility designed and constructed for the school.
- Schulte K–8 School – Built in 1967, the school serves Sturtevant and southwestern Mount Pleasant. It is named for Frederick F. Schulte, longtime music teacher at Park High School and founder of the Racine Symphony Orchestra. In the fall of 2025, a brand-new K–8 building opened on the original Schulte Elementary campus, completing the roll-up to the middle-school grades which began in the fall of 2023.
- Starbuck International K–8 School – Founded in 1961, the school serves the westernmost parts of Racine and most of Mount Pleasant. Additionally, students from the downtown area and areas immediately south and west are bussed to Starbuck. The school was named for Frank Raymond Starbuck, publisher of the Racine Journal-News and the Racine Journal Times from 1929 to 1952. In the fall of 2024, an expansion opened which merged Jefferson Lighthouse and West Ridge Elementary Schools into Starbuck to convert it into a K–8 school.

=== 6–12 schools ===
- The Racine Engineering, Arts and Leadership (The R.E.A.L.) School – The school serves students in sixth through twelfth grades and is one of the district's alternative education programs. A magnet school, it was founded in 2000 and has no neighborhood area. The REAL School was located in the former Olympia Brown Elementary building, which was purchased by RUSD in 1974 from the Racine Dominican Sisters. In the fall of 2017, the REAL School took up residence in the former Sturtevant SportsPlex.
- Walden III Middle and High School – Founded in 1972, the school is one of the district's choice schools and has no neighborhood area. In its first three years, Walden III enrolled only juniors and seniors at the former McMynn Building. In 1975, the school moved to the Franklin building, where it would stay until 2018, and expanded to include 7th through 10th grades in addition to the existing 11th and 12th grades. In 1983, due to district reorganization, the 9th graders moved to the high school and the middle school expanded to include 6th graders. The Franklin building was constructed in 1870 for the Sixth Ward grammar school. From the 1890s until 1975, it housed Franklin Elementary and Junior High School. In 2018, increased enrollment in the middle school program led to Walden's entire program being moved to its new location in the McKinley Middle School building.

=== High schools ===
- Jerome I. Case High School – Built in 1966, Case is the newest of Racine's three major high schools, serving primarily Caledonia and Mount Pleasant. Additionally, students from the area around the former Case factory site are bussed to Case High School. The school has 2,100 students and is accredited by International Baccalaureate.
- William Horlick High School – Considered the "north side" school, Horlick has served students from northern Racine and northeastern Caledonia since it opened in 1928. Its namesake, food manufacturer and malted milk magnate William Horlick, donated the land for the school to be built. The school currently has 2,100 students.
- Washington Park High School – Considered the "south side" school, Park has served students from southern Racine and southwestern Mount Pleasant since it opened in 1929. Named for its location in Racine's Washington Park, Park is the smallest of Racine's three major high schools, with 1,900 students.

In 2016 the district instituted the Academies of Racine at the three high schools, which included switching to block scheduling and organizing the schools into separate Academies, each with their own sequence of required core and encore courses.

=== Other facilities and programs ===
- The Administrative Service Campus – the headquarters and central office for the district. The ASC campus consists of three buildings in northwest Racine's Huck Industrial Park.
- Racine Alternative Learning (RAL) – a facility offering alternative education programs. The facility is located across the street from Gilmore Middle School. The programs offered at RAL include:

- Partners Educating Parenting Students – "a program for female high school students who are pregnant or who are parents."
- Racine Alternative Education – a credit recovery program for high school juniors and seniors.
- Special Education Options – a program for students with a "medical diagnosis of mental illness".
- The Transitional Education Program – helps students who have been incarcerated, treated for mental issues, or otherwise placed outside the school system return to school.

- The Sportsplex – an indoor soccer and sports complex in Sturtevant; it was purchased by the district in 2016, and currently houses The R.E.A.L. School.
- Turning Point Academy – an alternative education program for "at-risk middle and high school youth". It shares its building with John XXIII Educational Center, a private Catholic school not affiliated with the district. As of 2017, the Academy is in the process of relocating to the Racine Alternative Learning building.

=== Former schools ===
- Wind Point Elementary School – a former elementary school in the village of Wind Point.
  - It opened in 1966, In 2012 it had 237 students, with 50% coming from outside of the school's catchment zone. Ann Laing, the superintendent of Racine USD, characterized the school as having substandard scores on tests. It was closed following the 2012-2013 school year. The school board voted for the closure on a 7 to 1 (Julie McKenna) basis, with one board member, Melvin Hargrove, not appearing. McKenna cited her belief that schools with small student populations would be beneficial. The closure resulted in a $600,000 cost savings for Racine USD. Kathryn Poznanski was the school's final principal.
  - The Wind Point Elementary building temporarily housed Mitchell Elementary School students in 2014 after a fire damaged that school's permanent campus, but otherwise the school remained unused and the district continued maintaining the building. In 2017 town residents asked the school district to raze the building. In November 2017 the Racine USD school board agreed to have the building given to a limited-liability corporation which would raze the building for fears of vandalism and of perceived poor maintenance. The fixtures and other items in the building were sold in February 2018. Demolition began in April 2018, with housing slated to appear on the former school property.
- Janes Elementary School – Originally opened in 1857 as the Fourth Ward grammar school, it was named for Lorenzo Janes, a real estate businessman who donated land to the city, in 1897. Unique among RUSD schools, Janes had a year-round schedule from 1994 until 2016. During that time, it was thought to be the only year-round elementary school in Wisconsin. Janes served an area immediately north of downtown. Janes Elementary closed in 2023 following a restructuring of RUSD in response to a successful 2020 facilities referendum.
- Jefferson Lighthouse Elementary School – Jefferson Lighthouse is a magnet school, and has no neighborhood area. Since the late 1970s, the school has featured a gifted and talented program and is one of the district's alternative education programs. The school has been accredited by International Baccalaureate since 2012. It has been named after U.S. president Thomas Jefferson since its founding in 1899, while the word "Lighthouse", after the Wind Point Lighthouse, was added when it became a magnet school. In the fall of 2024, Jefferson Lighthouse was merged along with West Ridge Elementary into the newly expanded Starbuck Middle School to form Starbuck K–8 School.
- North Park Elementary School – Built in the early 1950s after parents in Caledonia were told they needed to build their own school, North Park served southeastern Caledonia and the northernmost part of Racine. The school closed in 2023 as part of RUSD’s restructuring following the 2020 facilities referendum.
- Racine Civil Leaders Academy (RCLA) – Constructed as the Third Ward grammar school in 1856, it displaced the first city cemetery. The original building was rebuilt in 1899, named Winslow School after Horatio Gates Winslow, superintendent of Racine city schools. The school closed in 2005 due to cost, before reopening as the home of the Keith R. Mack Alternative Center, an alternative education program for "at-risk middle and high school youth". After that program ended in 2013, the RCLA opened in the building. The Academy is a charter school and is unique among RUSD's schools, being the only one to require uniforms and use project-based learning.
- Roosevelt Elementary School – The school, named for U.S. President Theodore Roosevelt, opened in 1925. Serving northern Racine, Roosevelt had a focus on PBIS-system learning. The school's mascot was the Roosevelt Riders. The school closed in 2025 as part of RUSD’s restructuring following the successful 2020 facilities referendum.
- McKinley Middle School – Named for assassinated U.S. president William McKinley, the school was built in West Racine in 1921. It was a junior high or middle school for its entire existence, although from its inception until 1981 it occasionally also had an elementary school. Its athletics programs were known as the McKinley Vikings. In 2018, the McKinley Middle School International Baccalaureate program moved to the Starbuck Middle School building and the Walden III Middle and High School moved into the McKinley building.
- Trautwein Elementary School - The Trautwein School was built in 1912, on the Northwest corner of the intersection of Spring Street and Green Bay Road. In 1954, an addition was made, which included a plan to remove the bell tower, but due to student petitions, the tower was saved. The school closed in 1981.

== Administration ==
=== School board ===
The district's school board consists of nine members, each serving three-year terms, with three positions coming up for election every year. Officers are elected by a board vote every year. The board usually meets on the first and third Mondays of each month.

=== Superintendent ===
The superintendent of the district, whose role is to conduct the affairs and programs of the district, is employed by the school board. The superintendent of Racine Unified School District is Soren Gajewski, hired in 2024. Gajewski previously served as the district's chief academic officer and has been in education for 20 years.

In 2001 Thomas Hicks became the superintendent. Marguerite Vanden Wyngaard replaced in him in 2008 when he took retirement, and subsequent superintendents were Jackson V. Parker III, James J. Shaw and Ann Laing.
