= Caledonia, Wisconsin =

- Village
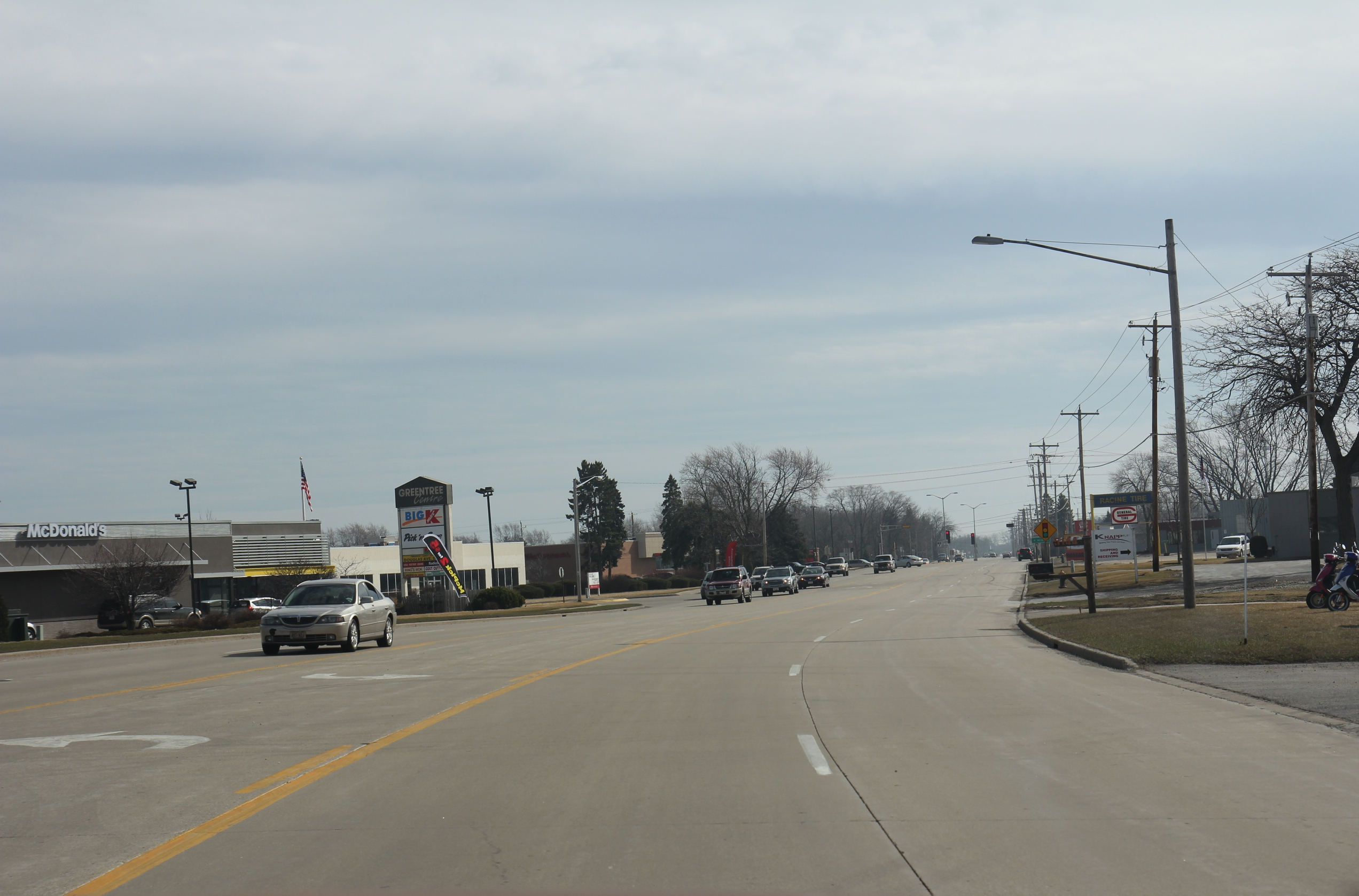
- WIS 32 in Caledonia at 4 Mile Road

- Location of Caledonia in Racine County, Wisconsin

- Location within Wisconsin Location within the United States
- Coordinates: 42°48′28″N 87°55′27″W
- Country: United States
- State: Wisconsin
- County: Racine

Area
  - Total: 45.52 sq mi (117.89 km^{2})
  - Land: 45.22 sq mi (117.13 km^{2})
  - Water: 0.29 sq mi (0.76 km^{2}) 6.75%
- Elevation: 659 ft (201 m)

Population (2020)
  - Total: 25,361
  - Density: 559/sq mi (215.8/km^{2})
- Time zone: UTC-6 (CST)
  - Summer (DST): UTC-5 (CDT)
- ZIP Code: 53108
- Area code: 262
- FIPS code: 55-11950
- GNIS feature ID: 1582904
- Website: https://caledonia-wi.gov/

Caledonia is a village in Racine County, Wisconsin, United States. The population was 25,361 at the 2020 census.

== History ==
Prior to January 2006, Caledonia was a town. After the state government denied Caledonia's request to become a village, the state legislature enacted a special exemption, allowing Caledonia to proceed. A referendum in 2005 allowed Caledonia to become a village.

== Geography ==
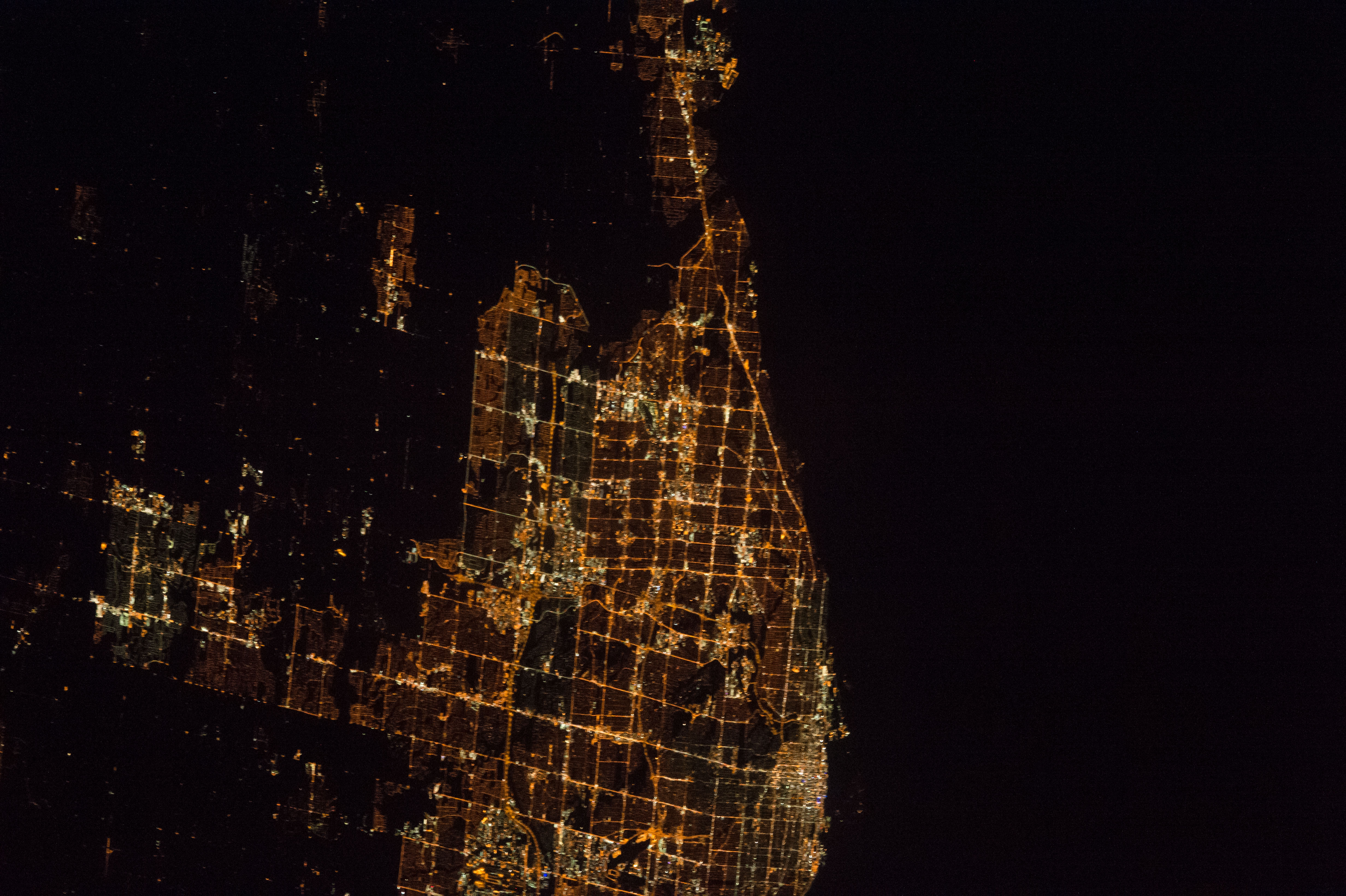
Caledonia and vicinity on November 15, 2015, during Expedition 45 of the ISS

According to the United States Census Bureau, the village has a total area of 48.72 square miles (126.18 km^{2}), of which 45.43 square miles (117.66 km^{2}) is land and 3.29 square miles (8.52 km^{2}) is water. The residential community of Franksville is located within the village. Franksville is a former census-designated place. The residential neighborhood of Husher is also located within the village. The lakeside community of Tabor is also in the village.

== Demographics ==
Historical population
Census	Pop.	Note	%±
1980	20,940		—
1990	20,999		0.3%
2000	23,614		12.5%
2010	24,705		4.6%
2020	25,361		2.7%
U.S. Decennial Census

=== 2020 census ===
As of the 2020 census, Caledonia had a population of 25,361. The median age was 46.4 years. 20.0% of residents were under the age of 18 and 20.9% of residents were 65 years of age or older. For every 100 females there were 98.4 males, and for every 100 females age 18 and over there were 96.0 males age 18 and over.

84.0% of residents lived in urban areas, while 16.0% lived in rural areas.

There were 10,263 households in Caledonia, of which 26.5% had children under the age of 18 living in them. Of all households, 58.6% were married-couple households, 15.3% were households with a male householder and no spouse or partner present, and 19.4% were households with a female householder and no spouse or partner present. About 23.4% of all households were made up of individuals and 10.7% had someone living alone who was 65 years of age or older.

There were 10,667 housing units, of which 3.8% were vacant. The homeowner vacancy rate was 1.1% and the rental vacancy rate was 5.2%.

Racial composition as of the 2020 census
Race	Number	Percent
White	21,360	84.2%
Black or African American	843	3.3%
American Indian and Alaska Native	105	0.4%
Asian	437	1.7%
Native Hawaiian and Other Pacific Islander	10	0.0%
Some other race	600	2.4%
Two or more races	2,006	7.9%
Hispanic or Latino (of any race)	2,198	8.7%

=== 2010 census ===
As of the census of 2010, there were 24,705 people, 9,629 households, and 7,187 families living in the village. The population density was 543.8 inhabitants per square mile (210.0/km^{2}). There were 10,056 housing units at an average density of 221.4 per square mile (85.5/km^{2}). The racial makeup of the village was 91.7% White, 2.8% African American, 0.4% Native American, 1.8% Asian, 1.5% from other races, and 1.8% from two or more races. Hispanic or Latino people of any race were 5.3% of the population.

There were 9,629 households, of which 31.1% had children under the age of 18 living with them, 63.6% were married couples living together, 7.0% had a female householder with no husband present, 4.1% had a male householder with no wife present, and 25.4% were non-families. 20.3% of all households were made up of individuals, and 8.4% had someone living alone who was 65 years of age or older. The average household size was 2.55 and the average family size was 2.94.

The median age in the village was 43.5 years. 22.6% of residents were under the age of 18; 6.5% were between the ages of 18 and 24; 23.2% were from 25 to 44; 33.3% were from 45 to 64; and 14.4% were 65 years of age or older. The gender makeup of the village was 49.7% male and 50.3% female.

=== 2000 census ===
As of the census of 2000, there were 23,614 people, 8,549 households, and 6,805 families living in the town. The population density was 519.1 people per square mile (200.4/km^{2}). There were 8,839 housing units at an average density of 194.3 per square mile (75.0/km^{2}). The racial makeup of the town was 94.18% White, 1.99% African American, 0.42% Native American, 1.27% Asian, 0.05% Pacific Islander, 0.91% from other races, and 1.18% from two or more races. Hispanic or Latino people of any race were 3.12% of the population.

There were 8,549 households, out of which 36.7% had children under the age of 18 living with them, 69.4% were married couples living together, 7.2% had a female householder with no husband present, and 20.4% were non-families. 16.1% of all households were made up of individuals, and 5.5% had someone living alone who was 65 years of age or older. The average household size was 2.71 and the average family size was 3.04.

In the town the population was spread out, with 26.0% under the age of 18, 6.5% from 18 to 24, 30.0% from 25 to 44, 26.7% from 45 to 64, and 10.8% who were 65 years of age or older. The median age was 38 years. For every 100 females, there were 99.8 males. For every 100 females age 18 and over, there were 97.8 males.

The median income for a household in the town was $61,647, and the median income for a family was $68,043. Males had a median income of $46,939 versus $30,859 for females. The per capita income for the town was $26,031. About 2.1% of families and 3.6% of the population were below the poverty line, including 3.1% of those under age 18 and 10.0% of those age 65 or over.

== Education ==
Caledonia is part of Racine Unified School District. Schools serving sections of Caledonia for elementary school, all in Caledonia, include Gifford K–8 School, Olympia Brown Elementary School, and North Park Elementary School. K–8 schools serving sections for middle school include Gifford K–8 and Jerstad-Agerholm K–8 School, the latter in Racine. Senior high schools serving sections of Caledonia include Jerome I. Case High School in Mount Pleasant and William Horlick High School in Racine. Previously Gilmore Middle School in Racine served a section of Caledonia. The R.E.A.L. School in Sturtevant and Walden III Middle and High School in Racine are magnet 6–12 schools serving the area.

Religious private schools in the area include Saint Rita School (K–8) of the Roman Catholic Archdiocese of Milwaukee, in Caledonia; and Trinity Lutheran School (K–8) in Racine.

A 2015 referendum asked residents of Caledonia whether they wanted to secede from Racine Unified School District and create an independent school district, which passed. State Senator Van H. Wanggaard proposed that the school district should be divided into territorial districts, which was incorporated in Wisconsin's 2015 budget, ensuring that Caledonia received one school board representative.

== Notable people ==
- Marcel Dandeneau (1931–2017), Wisconsin teacher and state legislator, lived in Caledonia; he served on the Caledonia town board for the Democratic Party and as chairman of the town board from 1992 - 1995

== See also ==
- List of villages in Wisconsin
