= Walden III Middle and High School =

Walden III Middle and High School: In the Process of Discovery

Location
- 2340 Mohr Ave. Racine, Wisconsin; United States
- Coordinates: 42°43′35″N 87°48′40″W

Information
- Type: Alternative Public secondary
- Motto: "If a man does not keep pace with his companions, perhaps it is because he hears a different drummer. Let him step to the music which he hears, however measured or far away."--Henry David Thoreau
- Established: 1972
- School district: Racine Unified School District (RUSD)
- Principal: Rob Kreil
- Teaching staff: 45.40 (FTE)
- Grades: 6-12
- Enrollment: 723 (2023–2024)
- Student to teacher ratio: 15.93
- Website: http://www.rusd.org/walden

Walden III Middle and High School is a middle and high school in Racine, Wisconsin that offers alternative education. Walden is one of the Racine Unified School District's two magnet schools for secondary students, alongside the REAL School. Located between the city's Midtown and School Section neighborhoods, Walden is smaller than most Racine schools, with 292 high school and 246 middle school students as of 2016, and "emphasizes increased freedom based on responsibility and accountability".

== History ==
The school was founded in 1972 by Jackson Parker and David Johnston, two teachers at Racine's Park High School and graduate students at the University of Wisconsin–Milwaukee. As part of their doctoral dissertation project, they intended to develop a paradigm for evaluating alternative secondary schools, and study the effectiveness of curriculum choices. The Racine Unified School District gave the pair permission to open Racine Alternative High School as part of their project, approving the proposal and purchasing the McMynn building, named for educator John G. McMynn, founder of the public school system in Racine, from the Racine Technical Institute to house it. In its original form, the school was intended specifically for "disaffected students who don't respond to the traditional high school" to whom it would offer "a flexible program and [...] community resources outside the classroom". The school opened in September and was given its current name in a vote by students, who chose it over "Frank Zappa High School". The name is taken from Henry David Thoreau's Walden, because of Thoreau's commitments to experimentalism and individuality, and the numbering references behavioral psychologist B.F. Skinner's utopian novel, Walden Two. During its first three years, the school admitted only 11th and 12th grade students. In 1975, 10th grade and a middle school (at the time grades 7 through 9) were both added; and due to district changes in 1983, 6th grade was added to middle school and 9th grade moved to high school.

=== Buildings ===
Walden's original location was the McMynn Building on 7th Street in downtown Racine. This school, named in honor of John G. McMynn, was originally built in 1903 to serve grammar school students in the city's second ward. After being used as an annex to Racine High School in the 1910s, the school board sold it and it then served a variety of purposes, including a ration board office during World War II and as part of the Racine Technical Institute. The building returned to the school district in 1972, when it was purchased to house Walden. In 1975, it was demolished, and on its site McMynn Towers, an apartment complex for senior citizens, now stands.

After the demolition of the McMynn Building in 1975, the Walden program moved into a then-vacant Franklin School Building at 1012 Center Street, between the city's Midtown and School Section neighborhoods. The original part of this building (the Franklin Elementary School Building), making up what would be known as the "West Wing", was constructed in September 1869 or January 1870, and consisted of six rooms in a two-story building. This school was first known as the Third Ward grammar school, but within its first year the city changed its ward boundaries and it became the Sixth Ward grammar school. The first expansion to this building was made in 1899, doubling its capacity by adjoining an identical six-room structure, and when the school reopened in September it was renamed Franklin school. The school was further expanded with the construction of a new wing opened in 1921, where the new Franklin Junior High School was located alongside Franklin Elementary School. These wings are connected by a breezeway, frequently used as an alternate entrance for students attending after-school activities. The junior high school at Franklin closed in June 1966, in part because African-Americans were overly concentrated at the school. The Franklin Elementary School closed at the end of the 1974–1975 school year, and the Walden program moved into the building the following year.

Red Apple Elementary School, a similar program built on many of the same "optional school" principles, had previously opened in Franklin Elementary School during its final year in 1974. After Franklin was replaced with Walden, Red Apple shared space with the school and occupied the West Wing until 1986, when it moved into the former Washington Elementary School building on the city's north side. Walden III continued to occupy the Franklin building until the summer of 2018, when a major reorganization of the district's middle schools led to the McKinley Middle School building being left vacant. Walden moved into the McKinley building in the fall of 2018, because it offered better facilities than the Franklin building and more room for the growing student population. Hundreds of pieces of artwork made by students over the years were moved to the new building, and others which could not be moved, such as murals, were photographed for preservation by the Racine Heritage Museum.

== Curriculum and programs ==
The Rite of Passage Experience (ROPE) is a graduation requirement completed by all seniors, and is the oldest comprehensive graduation portfolio in the United States. In the first two quarters, students are required to make a career portfolio showcasing their knowledge, talents and personality. This portfolio includes an autobiography, a reflective essay on a piece of literature, a résumé, letters of recommendation, and proof in various forms that the student meets both the requirements set out by the school district and additional, more rigorous requirements set by Walden III. Students must demonstrate mastery in eleven subject areas by giving presentations about topics from each. During the second two quarters, students are required to write a thesis on a topic of their choice. All of these are presented orally to the student's ROPE committee, composed of the two faculty members and a junior year student.

Walden III became Racine's first Green School in November 2006. The Walden Green School Initiative is an organization at the school which encourages environmentally-friendly actions, such as students recycling cans, bottles and paper, and plans for future efforts for more environmentally-conscious progress, funded by charitable donations and philanthropic grants. The group was instrumental in the installation of solar panels on the school's roof in 2008, which have raised money for other energy-efficiency projects, such as the installation of new weather-resistant doors in the school's breezeway

Students address teachers and administrators by their first names. An analysis by the Center for Public Education argues that this atmosphere promotes success, noting above-average test scores and that among Racine schools, "'the truancy rate is the lowest, and the graduation rate is the highest'".

== Administrators ==
The current principal of Walden III is Robert Kreil, who has been the school's principal since 2014. Previously, he has been assistant principal of Whitnall High School and a teacher in the Mukwonago Area School District. Kreil replaced retiring principal Bob Holzem, who also served as the district's Director of Alternative Schools and Programs, and thus was also the principal of the REAL School and the Keith R. Mack Center, as well as many of the district's smaller alternative programs. Other principals of the school have included Charles Kent and Jackson Parker, one of the school's founders.

The assistant principal is currently open. The school coordinator is Jennifer Jackson. Notable alumni include Dr. Brenton Doughty.
