= Ellen Ahrndt =

American baseball player

- Second base
- Born: November 8, 1922; Racine, Wisconsin, U.S.
- Died: November 8, 2009 (aged 87); Brodhead, Wisconsin, U.S.
- Batted: Right Threw: Right

Teams
- South Bend Blue Sox (1944)

Career highlights and awards
- Women in Baseball – AAGPBL Permanent Display at Baseball Hall of Fame and Museum (1988)

Ellen Ahrndt (November 8, 1922 – November 8, 2009) was an American second basewoman who played briefly in the All-American Girls Professional Baseball League (AAGPBL) during the 1944 season. Ahrndt batted and threw right-handed. Sometimes she is credited as Ellen Proefrock.

== Early life ==
A native of Racine, Wisconsin, Ahrndt was one of seven children into the family of Helen (née Patzke) and Edward Ahrndt. She grew up in a family farm in Racine, and spent her leisure time playing baseball with two of her sisters while her only brother was the manager.

At age 14, Ahrndt played softball in Racine and small towns around the area, and the state tournament was held in Milwaukee. She attended William Horlick High School, where she earned honors both in softball and basketball. She graduated in 1941, but did not lose interest in baseball. While playing softball, she received an invitation to come to the newly founded All-American Girls Professional Baseball League tryouts, which were to be held at Wrigley Field in Chicago, Illinois. With the prospect of making the $60 per week that was being paid to the members of the established teams, which was a vast sum of money by then, she decided to try her hand in the new league. She managed to win the job at second base with the South Bend Blue Sox for the 1944 season.

== Professional career ==
Ahrndt saw action in just three games. Once when South Bend came to Racine to face the Belles, the Blue Sox decided to honor her with a homecoming night. The Dumore Corporation sponsored the event creating a Babe Ahrndt Night at the field. Nevertheless, the next season she was not offered a contract.

Following her short AAGPBL stint, Ahrndt returned to Racine, where she married William Proefrock in 1947.

Ahrndt died on her 87th birthday, November 8, 2009.

== Facts ==
The AAGPBL folded in 1954, but there is now a permanent display at the Baseball Hall of Fame and Museum since November 5, 1988 that honors those who were part of this unforgettable experience. Ahrndt, along with the rest of the AAGPBL players, is now enshrined in the venerable building at Cooperstown, New York.

In 1992, filmmaker Penny Marshall premiered her film A League of Their Own, which was a fictionalized account of activities in the AAGPBL. Starring Geena Davis, Tom Hanks, Madonna, Lori Petty and Rosie O'Donnell, this film brought a rejuvenated interest to the women's baseball. Ahrndt received many writeups after the film gained cult status, being asked to speak to school children and grownups in different clubs.

== Career statistics ==
Batting

GP	AB	R	H	2B	3B	HR	RBI	SB	TB	BB	SO	BA	OBP	SLG
3	3	0	0	0	0	0	0	0	0	0	0	.000	.000	.000

== Sources ==
- The Diamond Angle interview
- Taste of Home recipe
- Journal Times obituary
