= Council for Advancement and Support of Education =

Nonprofitable association of educational institutions

The Council for Advancement and Support of Education (CASE) is a nonprofit association of educational institutions. It serves professionals in the field of educational advancement. This field encompasses alumni relations, communications, marketing and development (fundraising) for educational institutions such as universities and independent or private schools.

CASE, headquartered in Washington, D.C., in the United States, was founded in 1974 as the result of a merger between the American Alumni Council and the American College Public Relations Association. It is one of the largest international associations of education institutions, serving nearly 3,400 universities, colleges, schools, and related organizations in 61 countries.

Its North American member institutions are divided into eight geographic districts that provide support to members through regional programs. To better serve its international membership, CASE opened a European office in London in 1994 and an Asia-Pacific office in Singapore in 2007.

== Activities ==
CASE offers a variety of products and services such as conferences, webinars (the Online Speaker Series), books and training materials, and publishes CURRENTS magazine. It also maintains professional standards and a code of ethics for the profession.

CASE also engages in government relations, monitoring legislation and advocating the views and needs of its members.

== Major awards and events ==
CASE administers the annual U.S. Professors of the Year along with The Carnegie Foundation for the Advancement of Teaching as well as the Circle of Excellence awards. It also holds the Summit for Advancement Leaders, an annual conference for senior-level advancement professionals. Each CASE District holds an annual conference.
