= William Proxmire =

American politician (1915–2005)

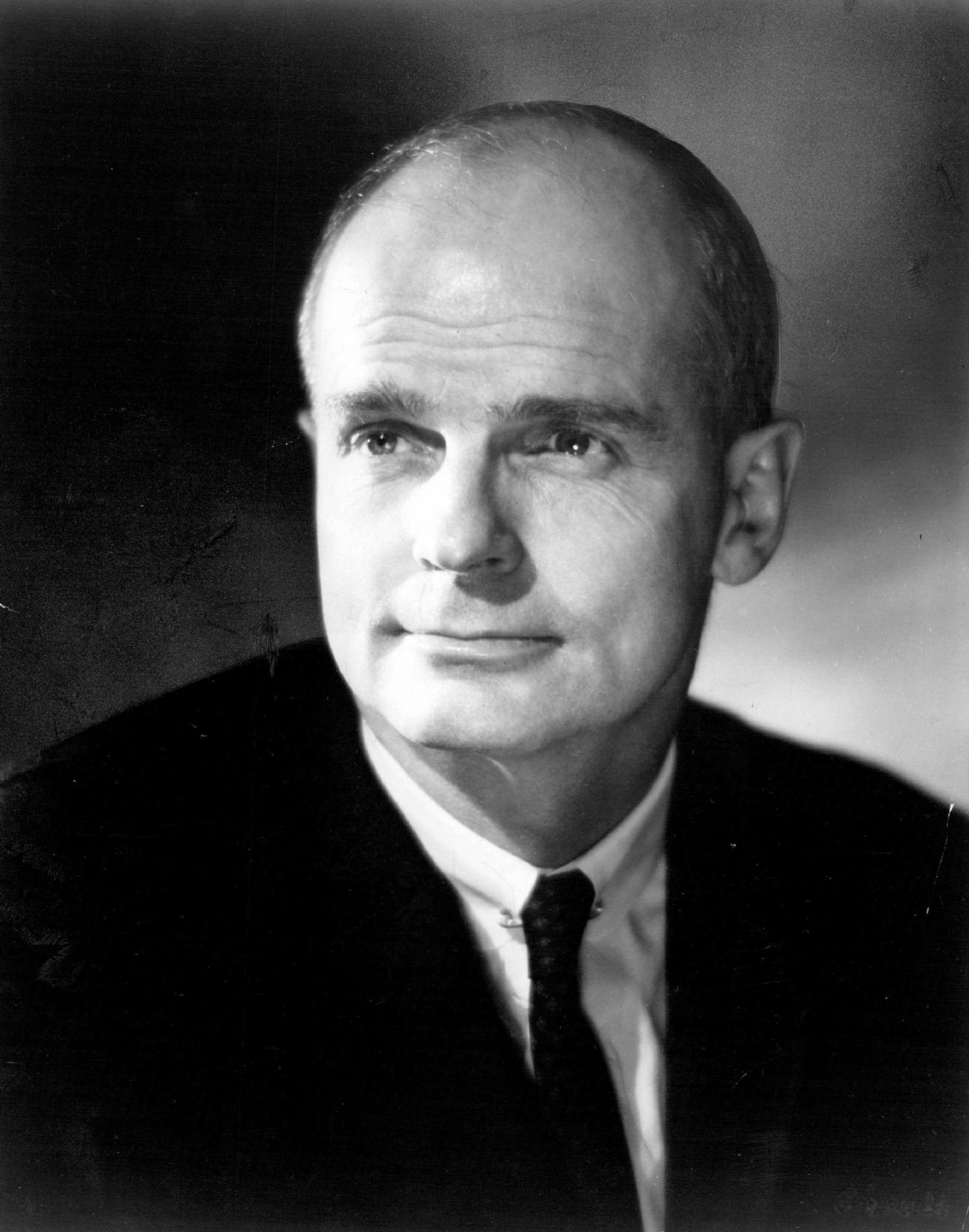

United States Senator from Wisconsin
- In office August 28, 1957 – January 3, 1989
- Preceded by: Joseph McCarthy
- Succeeded by: Herb Kohl
Senate positions
Chair of the Senate Banking Committee
In office January 3, 1987 – January 3, 1989
Preceded by	Jake Garn
Succeeded by	Donald Riegle
In office January 3, 1975 – January 3, 1981
Preceded by	John Sparkman
Succeeded by	Jake Garn
Ranking Member of the Senate Banking Committee
In office January 3, 1983 – January 3, 1987
Preceded by	Donald Riegle
Succeeded by	Jake Garn
Chair of the Joint Economic Committee
In office January 3, 1971 – January 3, 1973
Preceded by	Wright Patman
Succeeded by	Wright Patman
In office January 3, 1967 – January 3, 1969
Preceded by	Wright Patman
Succeeded by	Wright Patman

Member of the Wisconsin State Assembly from the Dane 2nd district
- In office January 10, 1951 – January 13, 1953
- Preceded by: John M. Blaska
- Succeeded by: Ervin M. Bruner

Personal details
- Born: Edward William Proxmire; November 11, 1915 Lake Forest, Illinois, U.S.
- Died: December 15, 2005 (aged 90) Sykesville, Maryland, U.S.
- Party: Democratic
- Spouses: Elsie Stillman Rockefeller (m. 1946; div. 1955) Ellen Hodges Sawall (m. 1956)
- Children: 4
- Education: Yale University (BA); Harvard University (MBA, MPA)
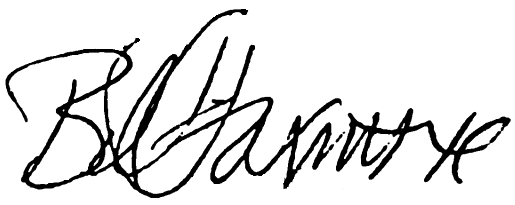
- Signature

Military service
- Allegiance: United States
- Branch/service: United States Army
- Years of service: 1941–1946
- Rank: First Lieutenant
- Unit: Counterintelligence Corps
- Battles/wars: World War II
- William Proxmire's voice Proxmire on the risk of increased demagoguery with televised coverage of the Senate; Recorded July 29, 1986

Edward William Proxmire (November 11, 1915 – December 15, 2005) was an American politician. A member of the Democratic Party, he served as a United States senator from Wisconsin from 1957 to 1989. He holds the record for being the longest-serving senator from Wisconsin.

Known as a political maverick and an aggressive critic of wasteful government spending, Proxmire invented and awarded the tongue-in-cheek Golden Fleece Award to appropriations he found particularly egregious. He was a member of the Senate Banking Committee, the Senate Appropriations Committee, and the Joint Economic Committee. On the Joint Economic Committee, he exposed numerous instances of wasteful spending on military programs such as the C-5 aircraft and the F-16 fighter, as well as other government programs such as the development of a supersonic transport airplane (SST).

== Early life ==
The son of Dr. Theodore Stanley Proxmire, a Chicago-area surgeon, and Adele (Flanigan) Proxmire, Edward William Proxmire was born in Lake Forest, Illinois, on November 11, 1915. He later used "William" rather than "Edward" out of admiration for actor William S. Hart. He graduated from The Hill School (in Pottstown, Pennsylvania) in 1933, Yale University in 1938 (B.A.), Harvard Business School in 1940 (M.B.A.), and Harvard Graduate School of Public Administration in 1948 (M.P.A.). While at Yale, Proxmire joined the Chi Psi fraternity. During 1940 and 1941 Proxmire was a student clerk at J.P. Morgan & Co. and studied public speaking at Columbia University.

During World War II he joined the United States Army as a private, and advanced through the ranks to master sergeant. Proxmire later received a commission in the Military Intelligence branch. Most of his service involved counterintelligence work in the Chicago area, where members of his unit investigated individuals suspected of subversive activity. He served from 1941 to 1946, and was discharged as a first lieutenant. While in the Army, Proxmire also continued to study public speaking at Northwestern University. After discharge, he was an executive trainee at J. P. Morgan before returning to Harvard.

After getting his second master's degree while working as a teaching fellow at Harvard, Proxmire moved to Wisconsin to be a reporter for The Capital Times in Madison and to advance his political career in a favorable state. "They fired me after I'd been there seven months, for labor activities and impertinence," he once said. When he ran successfully for the state legislature in 1950, Proxmire was working as the business manager of the Union Labor News, a publication of the Madison Federation of Labor.

== Wisconsin State Assembly ==
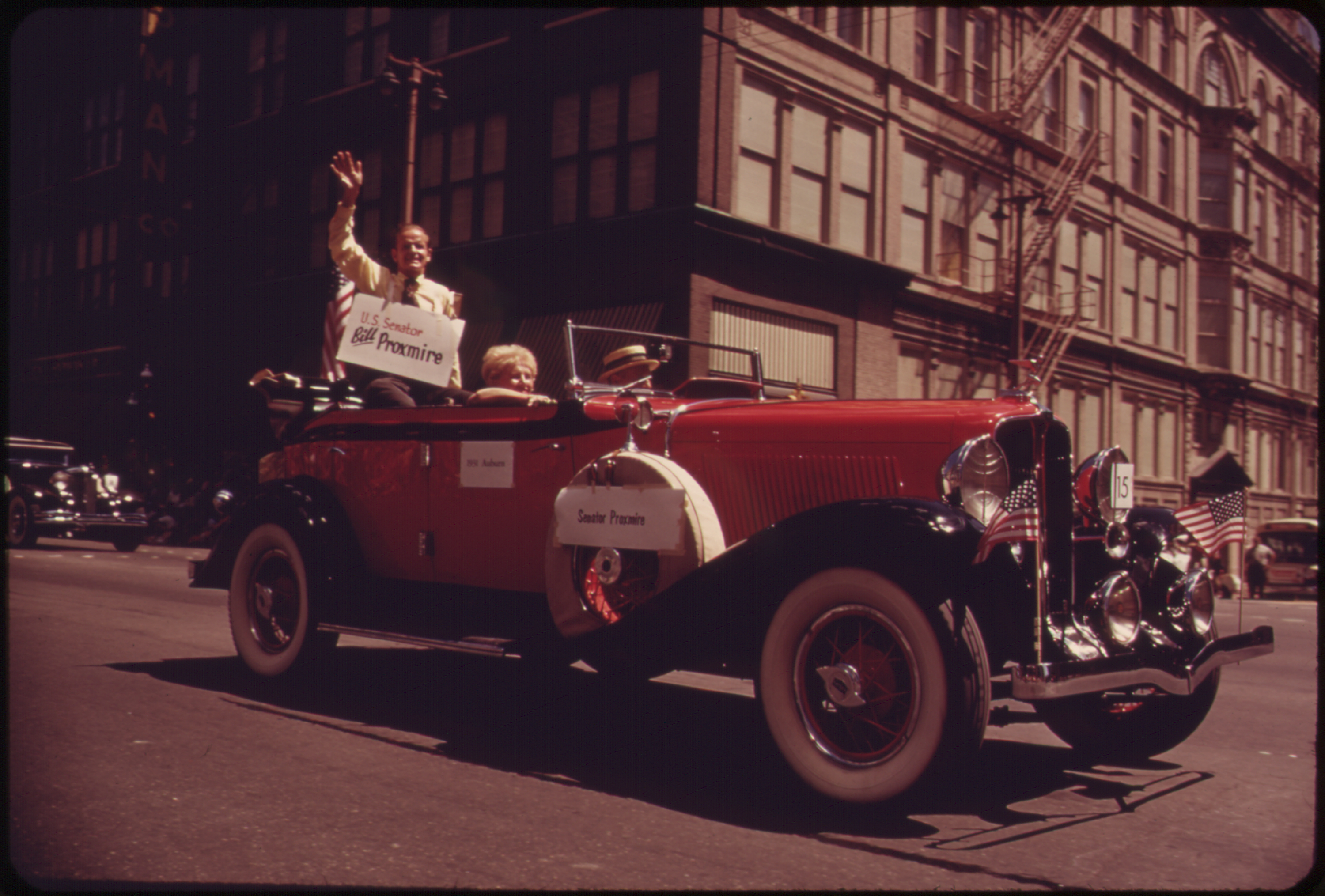
William Proxmire taking part in "Old Milwaukee Days" annual parade, photo from September, 1973

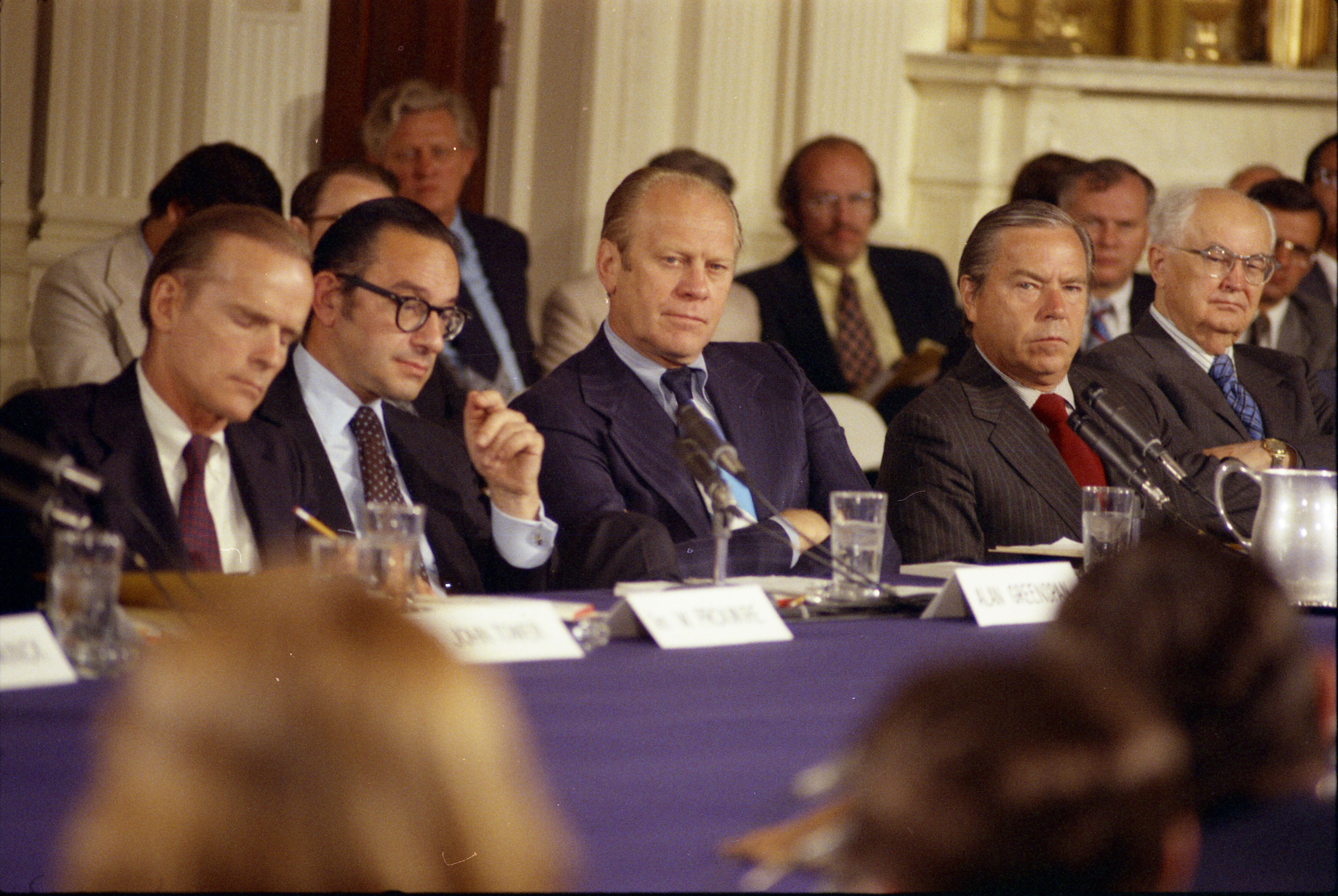
Proxmire, Alan Greenspan, President Gerald Ford, John Rhodes, and Wright Patman at a conference on inflation at the White House, September 1974

Proxmire served as a member of the Wisconsin State Assembly from 1951 to 1953. During his Assembly service, Proxmire was one of few members who maintained a perfect attendance record, a trait that he later continued in the U.S. Senate. While in the Assembly, he was employed as president of Artcraft Press of Waterloo. Proxmire was an unsuccessful candidate for Governor of Wisconsin in 1952, 1954 and 1956.

== U.S. Senator ==
In August 1957, Proxmire won the special election to fill the remainder of the U.S. Senate term vacated by the May 2, 1957 death of Joseph McCarthy. After assuming his seat, Proxmire did not pay the customary tribute to his predecessor and stated instead that McCarthy was a "disgrace to Wisconsin, to the Senate, and to America."

Proxmire was reelected in 1958, 1964, 1970, 1976 and 1982; all but his 1964 win were by wide margins, including 71 percent of the vote in 1970, 73 percent in 1976 and 65 percent in 1982. In both of his last two campaigns, Proxmire refused contributions and spent less than $200 out of his own pocket, which covered the expenses related to filing re-election paperwork, and he mailed back unsolicited contributions. He was an early advocate of campaign finance reform. Throughout his Senate career, Proxmire also refused to accept reimbursements for travel expenses related to his official duties.

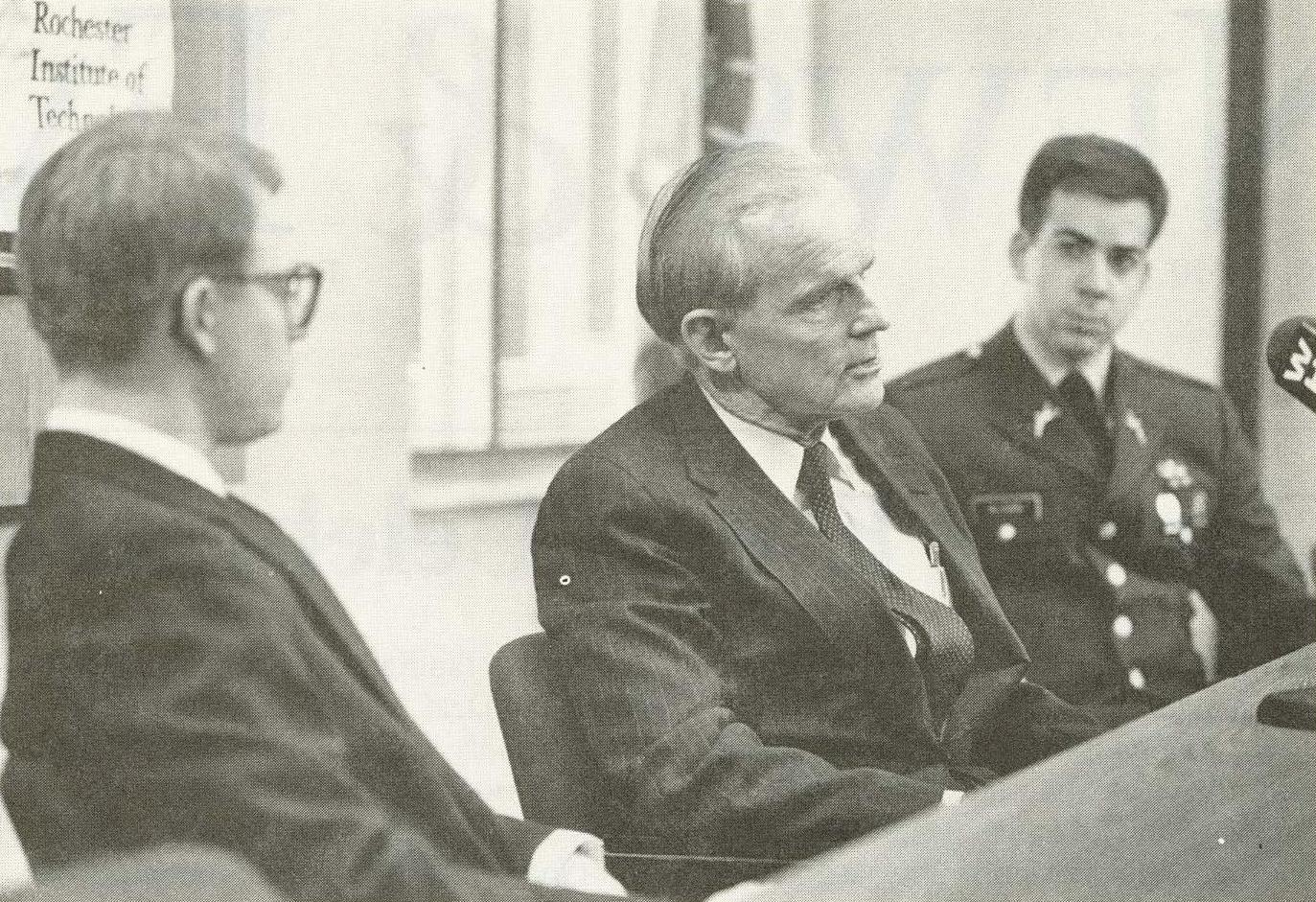
Proxmire in his later years

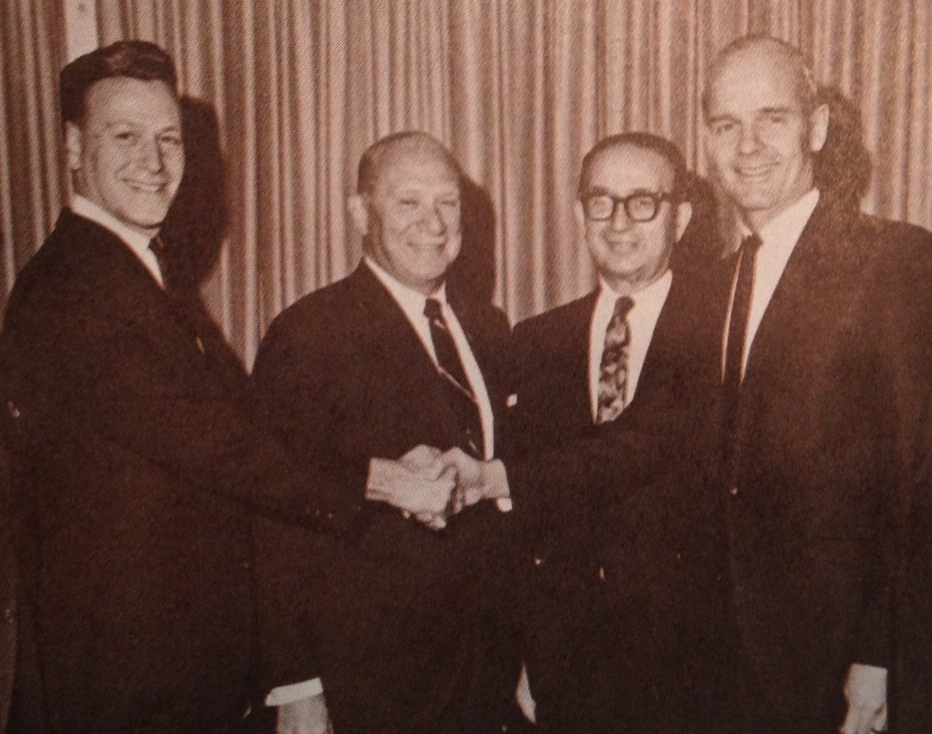
George Barasch, Congressman Herbert Tenzer, State Senator Simon Leibowitz, and Senator William Proxmire (left to right), 1966

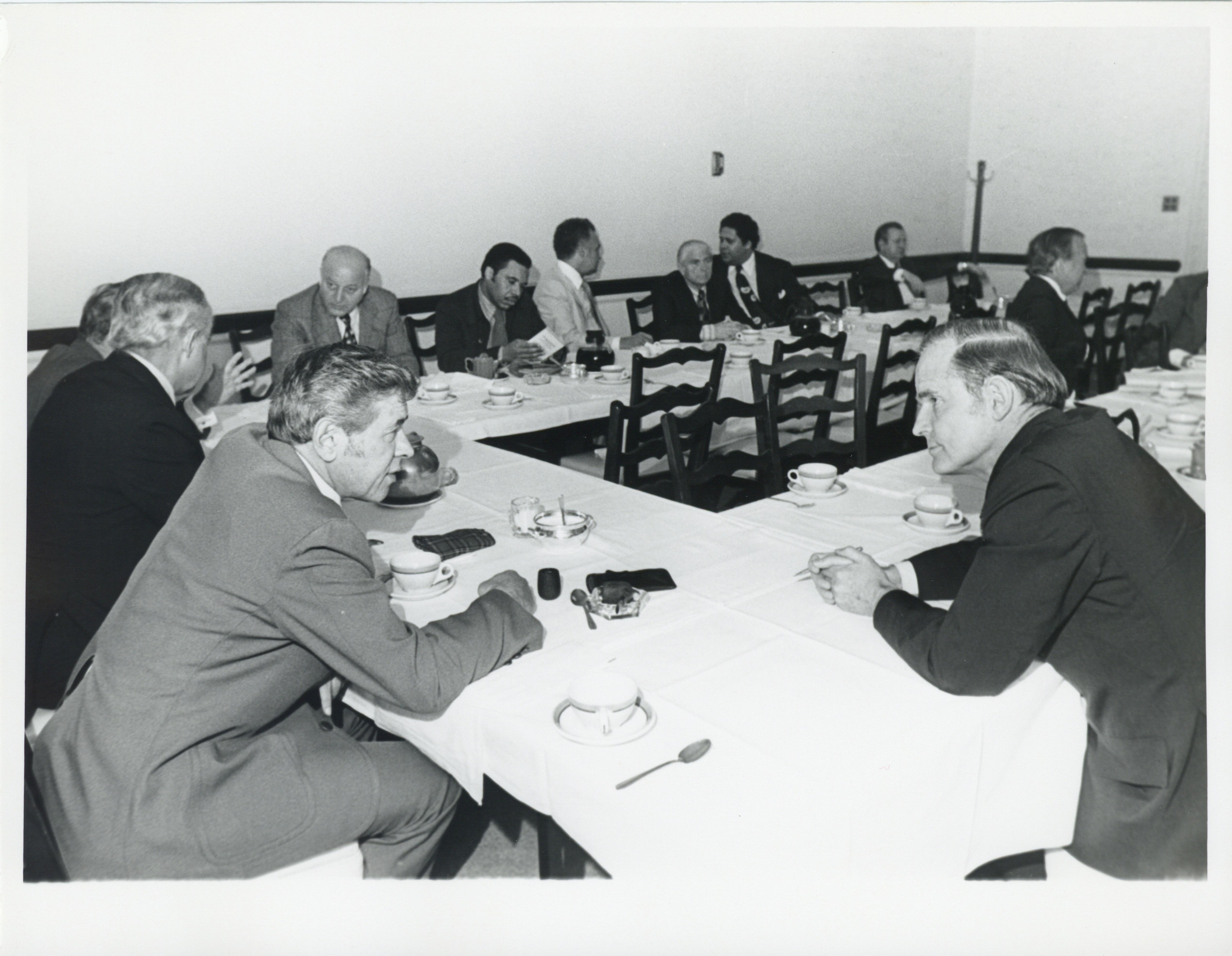
Proxmire at the Democratic leadership conference, date unknown

=== Consecutive roll call votes ===
Proxmire holds the U.S. Senate record for consecutive roll call votes cast: 10,252 between April 20, 1966, and October 18, 1988. In doing so, he surpassed the previous record of 2,941, which was held by Senator Margaret Chase Smith of Maine. In January 2016, Chuck Grassley broke Proxmire's record for longest amount of time between missed votes, but during his time without missing a roll call, Grassley had cast about 3,000 fewer votes than Proxmire.

=== Committee memberships ===
Proxmire served as the chair of the Committee on Banking, Housing and Urban Affairs from 1975 to 1981 and again from 1987 to 1989. During his first tenure in this position, Proxmire was instrumental in devising the financial plan that saved New York City from bankruptcy in 1976–77. Proxmire's subcommittee memberships included Financial Institutions, Housing and Urban Affairs, and International Finance and Monetary Policy.

In addition to his work on the Banking Committee, Proxmire rose through seniority to become a high-ranking member of the Appropriations Committee and was active on several subcommittees, including Defense, Housing and Urban Development, Labor, Health and Human Services, and Related Agencies, and Postal Service and Related Agencies.

=== Issues and legislation ===
In October 1961, Proxmire issued a statement opposing a planned $22 million renovation of the U.S. Capitol by arguing that a "large part of the space created by the extension" would be used "to house private hideaway offices" for 23 senators. Proxmire continued to oppose the renovation, and the debate continued until the project was completed in the early 1970s.

In March 1964, Proxmire charged that political concerns, not national defense needs, were keeping too many naval shipyards open, which resulted in a waste of federal funds: "On the basis of every statistical study, both by the Navy and independent groups, private shipyards can build, repair or modernize five ships for the same number of dollars needed to turn out four ships in navy shipyards." Proxmire unsuccessfully favored proposals that awarded contracts to the lowest bidder to save money and close unneeded facilities, and he pointed out that "the advantages of this free enterprise approach" had been recognized by Robert McNamara, the Secretary of Defense and a former corporate chief executive officer.

From 1967 to 1986, Proxmire gave daily speeches noting the necessity of ratifying the Convention on the Prevention and Punishment of the Crime of Genocide. He gave that speech every day that the Senate was in session for 20 years, for a total of 3,211 times. On February 11, 1986, the U.S. Senate ratified the convention.

In March 1969, Proxmire introduced legislation that would have regulated the credit life and disability insurance industries. He declared that Americans were being overcharged $220 million a year.

Proxmire was an early and outspoken critic of the Vietnam War and frequently criticized Presidents Lyndon B. Johnson and Richard Nixon. On the Senate Armed Services Committee, he exposed wasteful military spending and was instrumental in blocking military pork barrel projects. Despite his support of budgetary restraint, he regularly sided with dairy interests and supported dairy price supports.

Proxmire was head of the campaign to cancel the American supersonic transport and particularly opposed to space exploration and ultimately to eliminate spending on such research from NASA's budget. In response to a segment about space colonies run by the CBS program 60 Minutes, Proxmire stated that; "it's the best argument yet for chopping NASA's funding to the bone.... I say not a penny for this nutty fantasy." Proxmire introduced an amendment into the 1982 NASA budget that effectively terminated NASA's nascent SETI efforts before a similar amendment to the 1994 budget, by Senator Richard Bryan, terminated NASA's SETI efforts for good. With those positions, Proxmire drew the enmity of many space advocates and the science fiction fandom. Arthur C. Clarke attacked Proxmire in his 1960 short story "Death and the Senator". Later, the short story "The Return of William Proxmire" (1989) by Larry Niven and the 1991 novel Fallen Angels, written by Niven, Jerry Pournelle, and Michael F. Flynn, were directed against the senator.

In May 1971, Proxmire charged the Food and Drug Administration with violating federal law after it authorized residues of a cancer‐inducing hormone to come into contact with consumers. He asserted that the FDA's move was in violation of the Delaney amendment in the Food Additives Amendment of 1958 and called for an immediate ban on diethylstilbestrol.

In September 1971, Proxmire asserted the safety margin of the C‐5A cargo plane was threatened in spite of doubling costs and charged the US Air Force with not disclosing information on the costs to Congress.

In 1972, Proxmire urged the Air Force to recall General John D. Lavelle to active duty for the purpose of court-martial. Lavelle had been forced to retire as a major general due to alleged misconduct concerning Vietnam War bombing missions while he served as commander of Seventh Air Force. Lavelle was not recalled or court-martialed, and in 2007, newly declassified and released information exonerated Lavelle by showing that President Richard M. Nixon had authorized the bombing missions.

In November 1973, after Attorney General Elliot Richardson resigned, and Robert Bork took over as Acting Attorney General, Proxmire wrote in a letter that Bork was serving illegally as Acting Attorney General since 30 days had passed with him being in office and not having a confirmation by the Senate. He said that any actions taken by Bork in the period after the 39 had passed could be met by challenge, and he called on President Nixon to rectify the situation. Assistant Attorney General Robert G. Dixon Jr. disputed Proxmire's claim by saying that similar occurrences of Acting Attorneys General that went over 30 days without Senate confirmations had happened six times earlier.

In January 1977, Proxmire was one of five Democrats to vote against Griffin Bell, President Jimmy Carter's nominee for United States Attorney General.

In January 1978, Carter wrote Proxmire on the responsibilities of New York City denizens in his plan to have the city avoid bankruptcy. In April, after New York Senators Daniel Patrick Moynihan and Jacob Javits introduced a Carter administration bill that would provide New York City with $2 billion in loan guarantees, Javits stated that he did not believe Proxmire would try killing the measure by bottling it up in committee.

In May, Proxmire announced his willingness to hold hearings on continued federal aid to New York City prior to municipal labor unions having their contracts negotiated and that the Senate Banking Committee would wait as long as possible to secure information on the labor settlement's impact. Proxmire stated it was not aware of when the labor contracts would reach a settlement, and the potentially-years-long process could prevent the Senate Banking Committee from taking any action. June 1978 had four days of scheduled hearings by the Senate Banking Committee on continued federal aid to New York City. After the June 6 hearing, Proxmire stated he had maintained an open mind in spite of leaning toward opposition, a shift from his prior position of unwavering disagreement with continued aid and that he was not against a favorable vote on the legislation by the Banking Committee that would authorize the remainder of the Senate to consider the subject. He admitted that the committee was split in the opinions of its members. Days afterward, Proxmire told reporters that the labor bill's continued filibuster made the chances of the Senate acting on the legislation by the end of the month unlikely since unanimous consent was required to end the filibuster. Later that month, along with Texas Republican John Tower and Utah Republican Jake Garn, Proxmire was one of the three senators voting against reporting out the bill authorizing $1.5 billion of long‐term loan guarantees for New York City. Proxmire added that he believed that the measure would pass through the Senate in a similar manner to the panel vote.

In February 1978, after President Carter nominated G. William Miller for Chair of the Federal Reserve, Proxmire was noted to be a reliable source of contention but predicted from the start of his confirmation process that Miller would meet little opposition. At the end of the month, eleven members of the Senate Banking Committee pressed for a confirmation of Miller as Federal Reserve Chair, a motion that Proxmire rejected while he was scheduling the vote for another day, and he admitted that the nomination would be easily confirmed by the panel and the full chamber. On March 2, Proxmire cast the sole dissenting vote against the Miller nomination and called him unqualified for the office since he was without experience in economic or monetary affairs. Proxmire acknowledged Miller's business success and was joined by ranking Republican, Edward W. Brooke, in indicating that the Carter administration had influenced members of the panel to hasten the confirmation process. When Miller was later nominated as Secretary of the Treasury in August 1979, Proxmire was once again the only senator to oppose confirmation. He claimed to base his vote on Miller's "unwillingness to open a full-scale investigation of allegations that Textron, the company he once headed, paid bribes to numerous foreign officials while Mr. Miller was in charge." Proxmire acknowledged a lack of evidence to show that Miller had been personally involved in bribes.

In February 1978, Proxmire said that the Navy and the Air Force had spent "at least $42,000 in the last year transporting 3,500 local community leaders to 31 military bases to lobby for military programs" and labeled the trips an example of local citizens being lobbied for military programs. Proxmire added that the trips had included the Air Force favoring production of the B‐1 bomber and gave an estimate cost of 42,000, as the Air Force had turned down on specifying the price.

In February 1979, Proxmire sent a letter to Secretary of the Treasury W. Michael Blumenthal to call on the Treasury Department to withhold federal loan guarantees from New York City until incumbent Mayor Ed Koch agreed to larger cuts in the budget for the following year. He charged the budgetary assumptions of the city as being too reliant on federal aid increases. In March, Proxmire sent a letter to Federal Reserve Chair Miller on his reservations on the establishment of a free trade zone to allow international banking activity in New York City and advocated for the proposal to be first submitted to Congress, as opposed to unilateral regulatory action.

In October 1979, Proxmire wrote head of the General Accounting Office Elmer B. Staats to request the GAO to investigate claims that the Department of Housing and Urban Development had authorized the P.I. Properties to steal funds from the federal government and low income tenants. The same day, Proxmire delivered a speech on the Senate floor that condemned the failure of the Housing and Urban Development Department to act on recommendation from staff members to terminate funding for the P.I. Properties' 285-unit project at 14th and Clifton Streets in Washington, DC.

Proxmire was the only senator to vote against Ronald Reagan's Secretary of the Interior nominee of Donald P. Hodel in 1985.

=== Golden Fleece Award ===
Proxmire was noted for issuing his Golden Fleece Award, which was presented monthly between 1975 and 1988 to focus media attention on projects that he viewed as self-serving and wasteful of taxpayer dollars. Winners of the Golden Fleece Award included governmental organizations like the United States Department of Defense, Bureau of Land Management, and National Park Service.

The first Golden Fleece Award was awarded in 1975 to the National Science Foundation for funding an $84,000 study on why people fall in love. Other Golden Fleece awards over the years were awarded to the Justice Department for conducting a study on why prisoners wanted to get out of jail, the National Institute of Mental Health to study a Peruvian brothel ("The researchers said they made repeated visits in the interests of accuracy," reported The New York Times), and the Federal Aviation Administration for studying "the physical measurements of 432 airline stewardesses, paying special attention to the 'length of the buttocks.'"

Proxmire's critics said that some of his Golden Fleece awards went to basic science projects that led to important breakthroughs. In some circles, his name has become a verb for unfairly obstructing scientific research for political gain, as in "the project has been proxmired." In 1987, Stewart Brand accused Proxmire of recklessly attacking legitimate research for the crass purpose of furthering his own political career, with gross indifference as to whether his assertions were true or false as well as the long-term effects on American science and technology policy. Proxmire later apologized for several canceled projects, including SETI.

It is widely but incorrectly believed that Proxmire gave the award to Edward F. Knipling for his study of the sex life of the screwworm fly, the results of which were used to create sterile screwworms that were released into the wild and eliminated this major cattle parasite from North and Central America, which reduced the cost of beef and dairy products across the globe. In fact, there is no evidence for this claim in the Proxmire papers held by the Wisconsin Historical Society. In addition, the United States Department of Agriculture funded research on the sex life of the screwworm fly took place in the 1930s to the 1950s, long before the Golden Fleece era of the 1970s and 1980s, when Proxmire largely targeted contemporary research.

One winner of the Golden Fleece Award, Ronald Hutchinson, sued Proxmire for defamation in 1976. Proxmire claimed that his statements about Hutchinson's research were protected by the Speech or Debate Clause of the U.S. Constitution. The U.S. Supreme Court ruled that that clause does not immunize members of Congress from liability for defamatory statements made outside of formal congressional proceedings (Hutchinson v. Proxmire, 443 U.S. 111 (1979)). The case was eventually settled out of court.

== Personal life ==
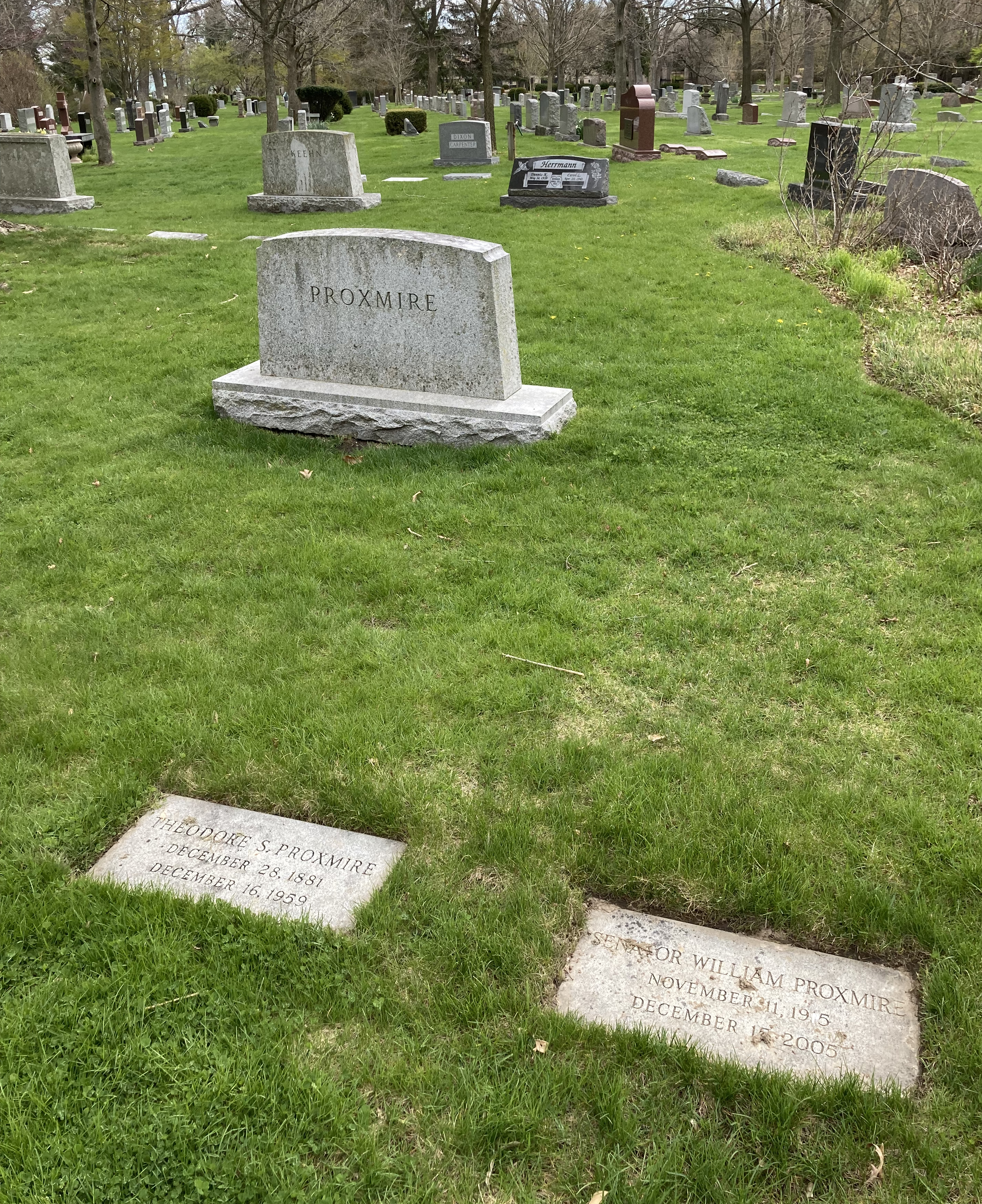
Proxmire's grave at Lake Forest Cemetery

In 1946, Proxmire married Elsie Stillman Rockefeller, a great-granddaughter of William Rockefeller, brother and partner of oil magnate John D. Rockefeller. They had two children, a son, Theodore, and a daughter, Elsie Stillman (Proxmire) Zwerner. Elsie Proxmire received an uncontested divorce in 1955.

In 1956, Proxmire married Ellen Imogene Hodges Sawall, who brought two children of her own to the marriage. Together, the couple had two sons, one of whom died in infancy.

Proxmire was the first United States Senator to get hair transplants for his pattern hair loss. The treatment he was receiving for a couple of months began on February 22, 1972. His 1972 tax return which was published in the Congressional Record revealed that he paid $2,758 for his hair transplant and claimed the operation as a medical expense.

Known for his devotion to personal fitness, which included jogging and push-ups, Proxmire earned the moniker "Push Up". In 1973, he published a book about staying in shape, entitled You Can Do It: Senator Proxmire's Exercise, Diet and Relaxation Plan. After leaving Congress, Proxmire had an office in the Library of Congress.

In 1998, Proxmire announced that he had been diagnosed with Alzheimer's disease. He died on December 15, 2005, aged 90, at a nursing home in Sykesville, Maryland, where he had lived for more than four years. He is buried at Lake Forest Cemetery in Lake Forest, Illinois.

== Written works ==
- Can Small Business Survive? H. Regnery Co., 1964; ISBN 0-405-11477-X
- (with Paul H. Douglas) Report from Wasteland; America's Military-Industrial Complex. Praeger Publishing, 1970
- Uncle Sam – The Last of the Bigtime Spenders. Simon & Schuster, 1972; ISBN 0-671-21432-2
- You Can Do It!: Senator Proxmire's Exercise, Diet and Relaxation Plan. Simon & Schuster, 1973; ISBN 0-671-21576-0
- Can Congress Control Spending? American Enterprise Institute for Public Policy Research, Washington DC, 1973; ISBN 0-8447-2039-9
- The Fleecing of America. Houghton Mifflin Company, 1980; ISBN 0-395-29133-X
- Your Joy Ride to Health. Proxmire Publishing Co. 1994; ISBN 0-9637988-2-0

== See also ==
- Advocacy group
- Agricultural policy of the United States

Party political offices
Preceded by Carl W. Thompson	Democratic nominee for Governor of Wisconsin; 1952, 1954, 1956	Succeeded by Gaylord Nelson
Preceded by Thomas E. Fairchild	Democratic nominee for U.S. Senator from Wisconsin (Class 1); 1957, 1958, 1964, 1970, 1976, 1982	Succeeded by Herb Kohl
Vacant Title last held by Howard Baker, George H. W. Bush, Peter Dominick, Gerald Ford, Robert Griffin, Thomas Kuchel, Mel Laird, Bob Mathias, George Murphy, Dick Poff, Chuck Percy, Al Quie, Charlotte Reid, Hugh Scott, Bill Steiger, John Tower	Response to the State of the Union address 1970; Served alongside: Donald Fraser, Scoop Jackson, Mike Mansfield, John McCormack, Patsy Mink, Ed Muskie	Succeeded by Mike Mansfield
Preceded by Mike Mansfield	Response to the State of the Union address 1972; Served alongside: Carl Albert, Lloyd Bentsen, Hale Boggs, John Brademas, Frank Church, Thomas Eagleton, Martha Griffiths, John Melcher, Ralph Metcalfe, Leonor Sullivan	Vacant Title next held by Mike Mansfield
U.S. Senate
Preceded by Joseph McCarthy	U.S. Senator (Class 1) from Wisconsin; 1957–1989; Served alongside: Alexander Wiley, Gaylord Nelson, Bob Kasten	Succeeded by Herb Kohl
Preceded by John Sparkman	Chair of the Senate Banking Committee; 1975–1981	Succeeded by Jake Garn
Preceded by Milton Young	Ranking Member of the Senate Appropriations Committee; 1981–1983	Succeeded by John C. Stennis
Preceded by Donald Riegle	Ranking Member of the Senate Banking Committee; 1983–1987	Succeeded by Jake Garn
Preceded by Jake Garn	Chair of the Senate Banking Committee; 1987–1989	Succeeded by Donald Riegle
