= Golden Rondelle Theater =

Theater in Racine, Wisconsin

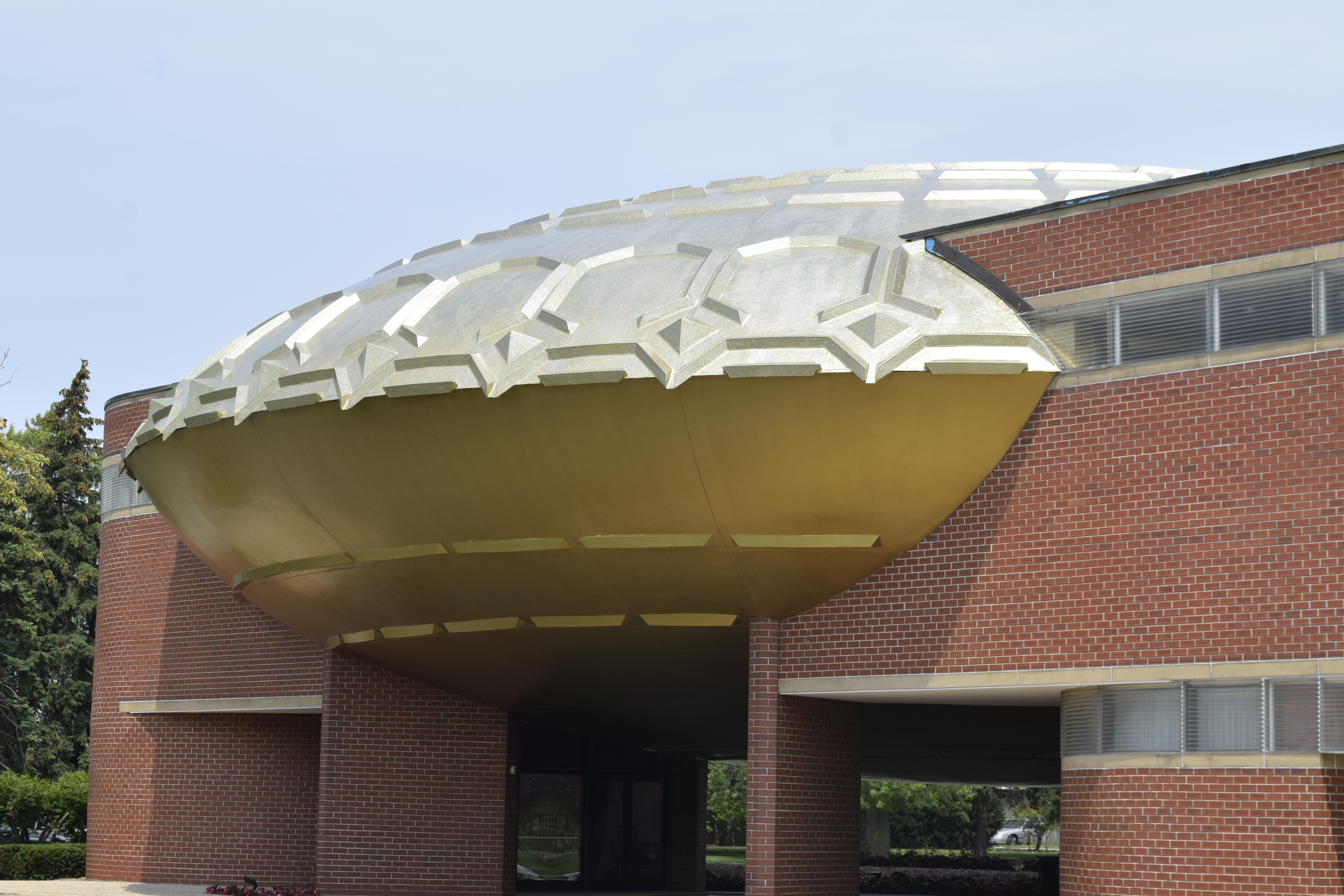
- The Golden Rondelle Theater at the Johnson Wax Headquarters
- Interactive map of Golden Rondelle Theater
- Former names: Johnson's Wax Pavilion (1964–1965)
- Address: 1525 Howe Street; Racine, Wisconsin; United States
- Coordinates: 42°42′55″N 87°47′27″W
- Owner: S. C. Johnson & Son
- Seating type: Continental seating
- Capacity: 308
- Screen: 1 (originally 3)
- Current use: Movie theater

Construction
- Groundbreaking: October 16, 1962 (World's Fair pavilion)
- Opened: April 22, 1964 (World's Fair pavilion)
- Renovated: 1976
- Closed: October 17, 1965 (World's Fair pavilion)
- Reopened: July 27, 1967
- Years active: 1964–1965, 1967–present
- Cost: $5 million ($52 million in 2025)
- Architects: Lippincott & Margulies

The Golden Rondelle Theater is a theater at the Johnson Wax Headquarters complex of S. C. Johnson & Son in Racine, Wisconsin, United States. Designed by Lippincott & Margulies, the theater was originally the Johnson's Wax Pavilion at the 1964 New York World's Fair. Construction of the theater began in October 1962, and the attraction opened on April 22, 1964, along with the rest of the World's Fair. The theater included 500 seats under a gold-colored, disk-shaped dome raised above ground. Originally, the theater screened Francis Thompson's short film To Be Alive!, and the rest of the Johnson's Wax Pavilion contained shoeshine machines, a home-information center, and a playground.

After the fair, the theater was relocated to Racine, and two brick pavilions designed by Taliesin Associated Architects were built. The Golden Rondelle was mostly rebuilt from scratch, except for the steelwork. It reopened in July 1967 and was renovated in 1976. Since being relocated to Racine, the Golden Rondelle has hosted numerous films, including several produced by Thompson. The theater has also been used for seminars, lectures, meetings, and events, and it has functioned as a visitor center.

== History ==
=== World's Fair ===
==== Development ====
Flushing Meadows–Corona Park in Queens, New York, United States, hosted the 1964 New York World's Fair. New York City parks commissioner Robert Moses was president of the New York World's Fair Corporation, which leased the park from the government of New York City. The household-goods company S. C. Johnson & Son of Racine, Wisconsin, had signaled its intention to build a pavilion at the fair by early 1962, leasing space from the World's Fair Corporation. Herbert Fisk Johnson Jr., the company's president, wanted to build an exhibit at the 1964 World's Fair because he had enjoyed the 1939 New York World's Fair. Other S. C. Johnson executives did not want the pavilion to be built, worrying that it would be unprofitable. In spite of these concerns, Johnson had the pavilion built anyway.

A groundbreaking ceremony for S. C. Johnson's pavilion took place on October 16, 1962. Lippincott & Margulies, which had helped S. C. Johnson devise a brand identity, was hired to design the structure. The pavilion was to occupy a 33,000-square-foot (3,100 m^{2}) site in the fair's industrial section, making it the first company from Wisconsin with an exhibit at the fair. The structure itself, consisting of a steel canopy above a disc-shaped auditorium, was to be dismantled and relocated after the fair. Johnson Wax president Howard M. Packard believed that Frank Lloyd Wright, who had designed the Johnson Wax Headquarters in Racine, would have approved of the design if he were still alive. Francis Thompson and Alexander Hammid were commissioned to produce the short film To Be Alive! for the pavilion; the film demonstrated children in various parts of the world maturing into adulthood. The film was originally 40 minutes long, but was reduced to 18 minutes to increase visitor throughput.

The pavilion topped out on October 29, 1963, with a ceremony attended by Wisconsin lieutenant governor Jack B. Olson, Johnson Wax executive Robert P. Gardiner, and Miss Wisconsin 1963 titleholder Barbara Bonville. A Norway pine tree from Boscobel, Wisconsin, was shipped to Flushing Meadows in 1963 to be displayed outside the Johnson Wax pavilion. By the end of that year, the theater had been labeled the Golden Rondelle, a reference to the theater's faceted-diamond shape. Due to inclement weather, there were delays in painting the pavilion's exterior and landscaping the site. A short film about the pavilion was broadcast on the television series Challenge in late March 1964, and S. C. Johnson soft-opened the pavilion for journalists on April 8. One-third of S. C. Johnson's annual advertising budget, $5 million, had been spent on the pavilion.

==== Operation ====
The World's Fair formally opened on April 22, 1964, and the Golden Rondelle Theater was dedicated that day. S. C. Johnson selected ten multilingual college graduates from different countries to serve as the pavilion's hosts; it also hired ten hosts from the U.S. The pavilion originally screened To Be Alive! 24 times a day, for which no admission fees were charged. Within a month, 308,615 people had visited the Johnson Wax Pavilion, making it one of the fair's most popular attractions. Visitors included former U.S. president Dwight D. Eisenhower, as well as various other politicians, actors, and entertainers. On some days, the theater accommodated 13,000 daily visitors, and more than 5,000 people each used the pavilion's shoeshine machines and information center. Guests sometimes had to wait up to 40 minutes to see the film. As such, S. C. Johnson increased the number of daily screenings of To Be Alive!. Moses designated June 23, 1964, as "Johnson's Wax Day", during which special events were hosted at the Johnson's Wax Pavilion.

The Johnson's Wax Pavilion had recorded one million visitors by mid-July 1964; the pavilion was especially popular for its free shoeshine service and its film. By September, two million people had visited the pavilion. Toward the end of the fair's first season, screenings of To Be Alive! were shortened slightly so the theater could accommodate more visitors. The pavilion temporarily closed when the first season ended on October 18, 1964. Around 2.5 million people had seen To Be Alive! during the 1964 season, making the Johnson's Wax Pavilion one of the most popular attractions at the fair. The pavilion's shoeshine machines had given more than 1 million shoe shines, and its information center had answered over 450,000 questions. S. C. Johnson renovated the pavilion between the 1964 and 1965 seasons. The pavilion's information center was expanded, additional objects were installed in the pavilion's play area, crowd control was improved, and the shoeshine machines were refurbished. Privet bushes were planted around the auditorium, though the auditorium itself was unchanged.

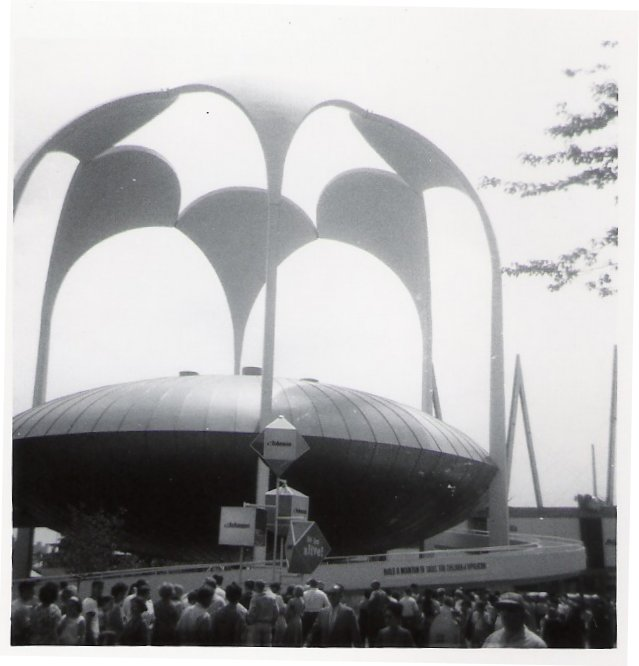
Original appearance of the theater at the 1964 New York World's Fair

The pavilion reopened at the beginning of the fair's second season on April 21, 1965, following a soft opening the previous week. To Be Alive! had continued to garner critical acclaim during the off-season, so S. C. Johnson decided to screen the film 30 times a day for the 1965 season. During the first two months of the season, visitation to the pavilion increased compared with 1964, even as overall fairground attendance decreased. The pavilion reached 3 million total visitors in mid-June 1965 and 5 million visitors by mid-October. The second season ended on October 17, 1965, with the pavilion recording wait times of up to three hours on that date. The Johnson's Wax Pavilion had recorded 5 million visitors over two seasons, making it the 12th-most-popular attraction at the fair, and it had shined 1.98 million pairs of shoes. A New York Times reporter wrote that To Be Alive! had made the Johnson's Wax Pavilion a successful low-budget attraction. Lippincott & Margulies itself said, "The entire Johnson exhibit has won so much acclaim that our company is pleasantly embarrassed by its success."

=== Subsequent use ===
==== Relocation and reopening ====
After the fair, the theater was dismantled so it could be relocated. S. C. Johnson considered moving the Golden Rondelle Theater to Racine, but no decision had been made on this by late 1965. The company announced in January 1966 that the theater would be relocated to Racine, being rebuilt next to the Johnson Wax Headquarters. Taliesin Associated Architects, a firm formed by apprentices of Frank Lloyd Wright, was to design a pair of pavilions flanking the theater. The theater would screen To Be Alive! and would also be used for corporate meetings. S. C. Johnson donated the pavilion's playground to the Wisconsin State Welfare Board, which reinstalled it at the Southern Colony and Training School, a special education school in Union Grove, Wisconsin.

Excavations for the relocated theater began in late June 1966. S. C. Johnson awarded a general contract for the theater's relocation to local firm Johnson & Henrickson, while another local company, Nielsen Iron Works, was hired as the steel contractor. More than a dozen buildings to the north of the headquarters, including property on both sides of 14th Street between Franklin and Howe streets, was acquired and demolished to create a park-like setting for the theater. The structure itself was rebuilt on the south side of 14th Street, and a parking lot was built south of the theater. When the structure itself was rebuilt, the steel shell was the only part of the original pavilion that was retained. The project cost $350,000 in total. The theater was rededicated on July 27, 1967, with a screening of To Be Alive!. The Golden Rondelle was the last building added to the Johnson Wax Administration complex until the completion of Fortaleza Hall in 2010.

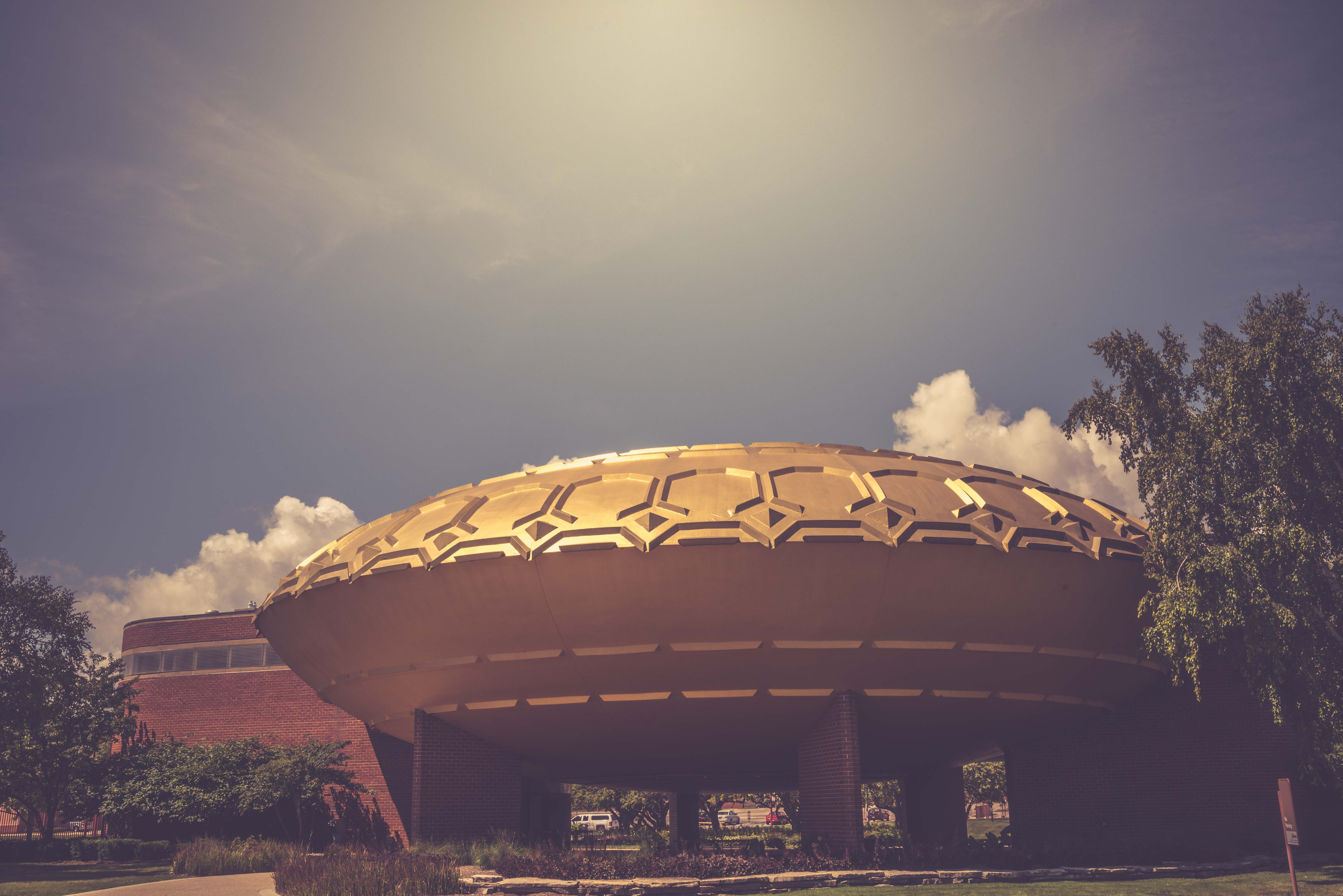
Theater after its relocation to Racine

Initially, the Golden Rondelle Theater screened To Be Alive! 32 times a week. The theater also initially hosted S. C. Johnson meetings. This consisted of six shows per weekday (with two additional shows on Thursdays) and three shows per day on the weekend. The theater accommodated 140,000 visitors in the year after its relocation, at which point it was one of Racine's most popular attractions. The Capital Times of Madison, Wisconsin, wrote that visitors hardly had to wait to enter the theater in Racine, unlike at the World's Fair. S. C. Johnson hired Llewelyn Davies Associates in 1969 to create plans for redeveloping the area around the Johnson Wax Headquarters. The plan was released in 1970 and called for a public park around the Golden Rondelle Theater and housing north of the theater, which never occurred.

==== 1970s to present ====
After interest in To Be Alive! declined, the Golden Rondelle began to host other free events in 1972, when Marge Davis was hired as the theater's event organizer. The events there included as workshops, pantomime performances, and the Ecology Film Festival. By 1976, the relocated theater had hosted 700,000 visitors. The same year, to celebrate the American bicentennial, a larger screen and a surround sound system were installed so the theater could display the film American Years. After the bicentennial, visitors had to make reservations to see American Years. In addition, the theater hosted annual events such as Christmas gift-making programs, environmental seminars, and St. Patrick's Day folk concerts. The Golden Rondelle Theater was hosting 100,000 annual visitors by the late 1970s, hosting 4,000 events annually. The theater was frequently filled to two-thirds capacity, though more visitors tended to come during the summer. Nearly two-thirds of the theater's events were open to the general public, although S. C. Johnson (which had priority over events at the theater) was responsible for around 35% of the theater's programming.

The Francis Thompson film To Fly was screened at the Golden Rondelle starting in 1978, and Johnson Wax began hosting the Kaleidoscope Educational Series at the Golden Rondelle the next year. The Golden Rondelle began screening Thompson's film Living Planet in 1980, and it continued to screen American Years, To Be Alive!, and To Fly as well. It also showed IMAX films on its wide screen. To attract visitors, the theater became part of the Greater Milwaukee Visitors and Convention Bureau in the early 1980s. By that decade, the Golden Rondelle Theater had become a visitor center for the headquarters, with guided tours originating out of the theater. The Golden Rondelle also hosted community events such as recitals, lectures, and seminars. Religiously and politically neutral nonprofit organizations held meetings at the Golden Rondelle, and the theater produced some of its own comedy and films. In 1986, the theater started displaying another Thompson film, On the Wing, which replaced To Fly.

By the 1990s, the theater screened the films Living Planet, On the Wing, and To Be Alive! upon request. Screenings of To Be Alive! had to be halted because the physical film was decaying, though the film was later restored and digitized. About 10,000 of the Johnson Wax Headquarters' annual visitors watched one of the Golden Rondelle's films; many of these visitors hailed from other states or nations. A film about Frank Lloyd Wright in Wisconsin was displayed to these visitors. In addition, 35,000 local students visited the theater annually as part of the Golden Rondelle's Kaleidoscope Educational Series. The Golden Rondelle continues to function as a visitor center for the Johnson Wax Headquarters in the 21st century. Tours of the headquarters begin there, and it also hosts events for S. C. Johnson & Son and was rented to third parties. The film Carnauba, A Son's Memoir was also screened at the theater starting in 2002. In addition, the theater's roof was repaired in 2018 after S. C. Johnson staff discovered a leak.

== Description ==
The Golden Rondelle Theater is just north of the Johnson Wax Headquarters' Research Tower, near the intersection of 14th and Franklin streets in Racine, Wisconsin, United States. It was designed by Lippincott & Margulies as a 1964 New York World's Fair pavilion. Measuring 90 feet (27 m) in diameter, the theater has a saucer-shaped, gold-colored roof. The frame uses 300 short tons (270 long tons; 270 t) of steel. According to Lippincott & Margulies, the design was meant to convey the company's brand image so that it could "be readily appreciated by Hottentots or Eskimos". The New York Times cites the design as having been inspired by a church that Frank Lloyd Wright designed.

By the late 20th century, the Golden Rondelle was one of a relatively small number of attractions that remained from the 1964 World's Fair, along with structures such as the Wisconsin Pavilion and pieces of the Coca-Cola and Spanish pavilions. The theater was one of three 1964 World's Fair exhibits in Wisconsin that were detailed in the 2014 documentary After the Fair.

=== Original layout ===
When the theater was located at Flushing Meadows–Corona Park, it sat at the intersection of the Avenue of Europe and the Eisenhower Promenade. The theater was covered by another canopy with six columns that surrounded a reflecting pool, curving inward at their tops. The columns were variously cited as measuring 80 feet (24 m) or 90 feet (27 m) high. Each of the columns was made of concrete and weighed 10 short tons (8.9 long tons; 9.1 t). The canopy above the columns was variously described as resembling a tulip, a clamshell, or a mixture of a clamshell and a spaceship.

The theater itself was originally 24 feet (7.3 m) or 25 feet (7.6 m) above ground and was accessed by an overpass from a neighboring building. There was a double-level promenade surrounding the theater. Inside were 500 seats or 600 seats, which consisted of simple benches. There were also three screens each measuring 18 feet (5.5 m) wide, which were placed next to each other. In an early precursor to the IMAX film format, three projectors could display a wide shot across multiple screens or separate images on each screen. Another ramp led from the exit to ground level. In addition, a walkway led from the ground to a staging area on the second floor; this walkway was lined with industrial exhibits. The theater's ceiling was filled with batts, which were made of mineral wool. The batts reduced vibrations caused by planes at the nearby John F. Kennedy and LaGuardia airports, and it also allowed the auditorium to use smaller air conditioning equipment.

Next to the theater was a two-story building with various educational displays and entertainment, These included ten automatic shoe shining machines that could shine visitors' shoes for free. For the 1964 season, the Home Care Information Center had eight teleprinters, where visitors could ask questions about household matters such as homes, automobiles, and furniture finishes. Additional teleprinters were installed during the 1965 season. The queries were sent to computers in the National Cash Register pavilion, and the answers were typed out on the teleprinters. There was also a playground on the ground floor, which included robots, mirrors, tunnels, and noisemakers. These objects could be moved or unhidden using switches, buttons, and cranks. Marigold flowers were grown in greenhouses and planted around the theater, and there were also privet bushes during the 1965 season.

=== Reconfiguration ===
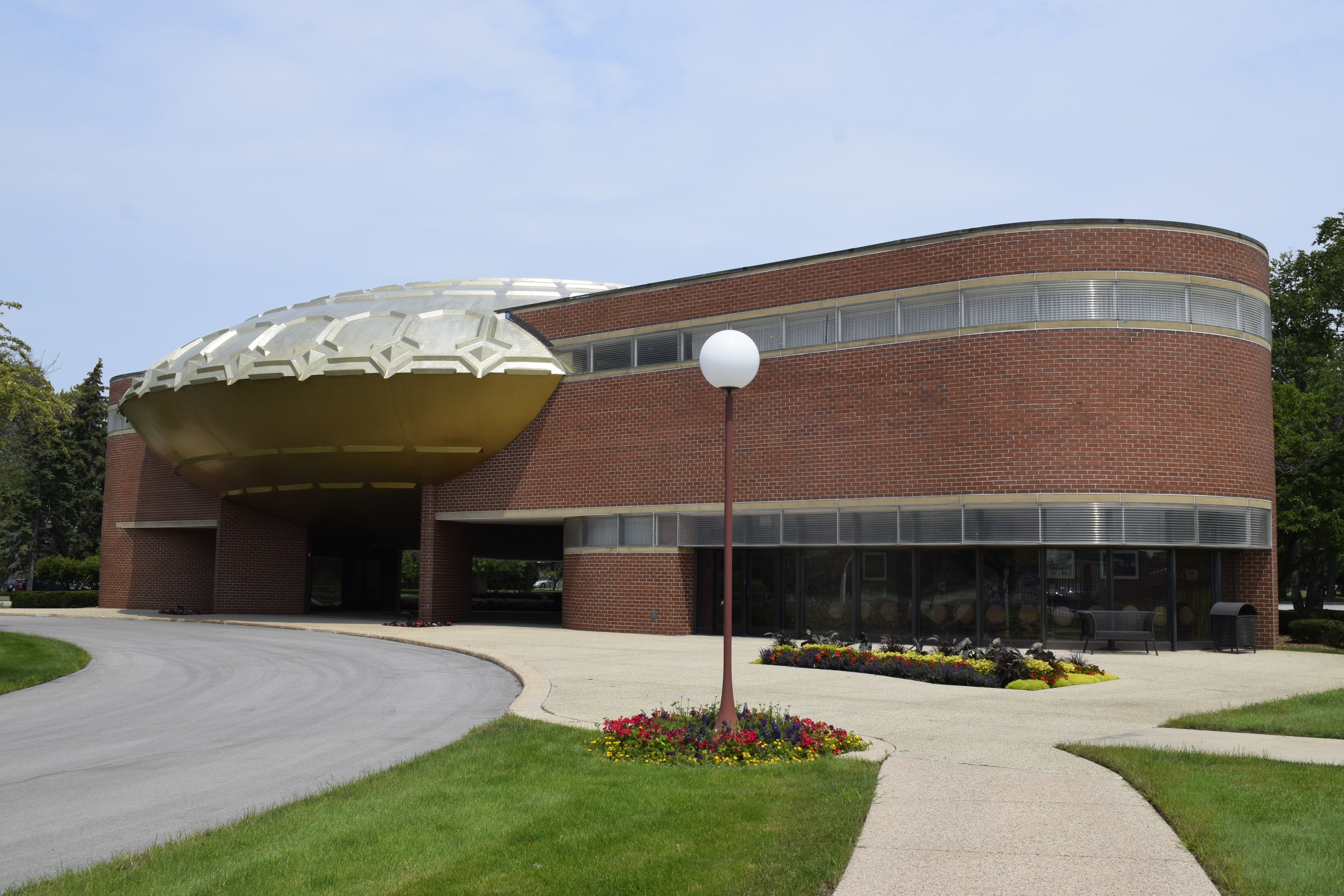
The pavilions' architecture was intended to complement the Johnson Wax Headquarters' design.

The Golden Rondelle Theater was moved to the Johnson Wax Headquarters after the fair closed. It functions as a visitor center for the Johnson Wax Headquarters. The roof of the Golden Rondelle is supported by six reinforced-concrete piers. The lower section of the roof is covered with cement plaster, while the upper half is covered with several coats of neoprene, gold-colored synthetic rubber, and a lacquered finish. Both sections of the roof are covered with 500 pounds (230 kg) of plaster glitter, in addition to triangular pieces of precast concrete.

Inside the auditorium are 308 or 320 seats. In contrast to the seats in the original pavilion, the current theater has 11 rows of individual, padded seats, arranged in a continental seating layout. The three projectors from the original pavilion were preserved in the relocated theater. The three 18-foot-wide screens from the World's Fair were also originally installed at the theater, but they were replaced in 1976 with a single screen. The newer screen measures 54 feet (16 m) or 55 feet (17 m) across and is capable of screening IMAX films. Eleven surround sound speakers also date from the theater's 1976 renovation.

Flanking the theater are two brick pavilion with glass-tube windows, designed by Taliesin Associated Architects. The pavilion to the south includes a lobby and display area, in addition to Heating, ventilation, and air conditioning machinery. Also within the southern pavilion is a hydraulic elevator for disabled patrons. The other structure, to the north, is an exit. The pavilions' architecture was intended to complement the Johnson Wax Headquarters' design. The theater's roof is wedged between the pavilions, and part of the roof overhangs the offices inside one of the pavilions.

== Reception ==
When the Johnson's Wax Pavilion was built, a critic for The Cincinnati Enquirer praised the structure for the "buoyant qualities of its circular spaceship-moorings design", while Variety magazine wrote that the building was "themed to inspiration". The New Pittsburgh Courier characterized the pavilion as having "spinnaker-like petals and [a] golden disc-shaped theater", while Time magazine called the canopy "a huge gold clam over a blue pool inside six slender white pylons that rise high and flare into unearthly petals". Ada Louise Huxtable of The New York Times characterized the canopy as one of several "accidental juxtapositions and cockneyed contrasts built into the fair that give it its particular attraction and charm", while Architectural Forum regarded the pavilion as one of a small number of "exceptional" attractions at the fair. By contrast, a reporter for The Atlanta Constitution criticized the fact that the pavilion's movie did not actually promote S. C. Johnson products, and a writer for The Morning News said that the exhibit "may prove rather heady stuff for some" despite its high acclaim.

After the Golden Rondelle Theater was relocated to Racine, the Chicago Tribune wrote that the "golden disc [...] looks much the same as it did when it stood in Flushing Meadow". The Kenosha News wrote that the theater "stands for positive values in an often negative world" mainly because of To Be Alive!, while another Kenosha News article likened the theater to "a spaceship tethered to the ground". Te Racine Journal Times described the theater as a "golden gift" to Racine in 1986, and the same newspaper wrote in 2014 that it "has come to stand as one of the City of Racine's most recognizable symbols". A writer for Backstage magazine wrote that the Golden Rondelle's location was particularly apt because To Be Alive! and the Johnson Wax Headquarters both "challenged traditions". Conversely, The Wall Street Journal wrote that the theater "gleams incongruously, like some vestige of The Jetsons".
