= Johnson Wax Headquarters =

Corporate headquarters in Racine, Wisconsin

- Administration Building and Research Tower, S.C. Johnson Company
- U.S. National Register of Historic Places
- U.S. National Historic Landmark
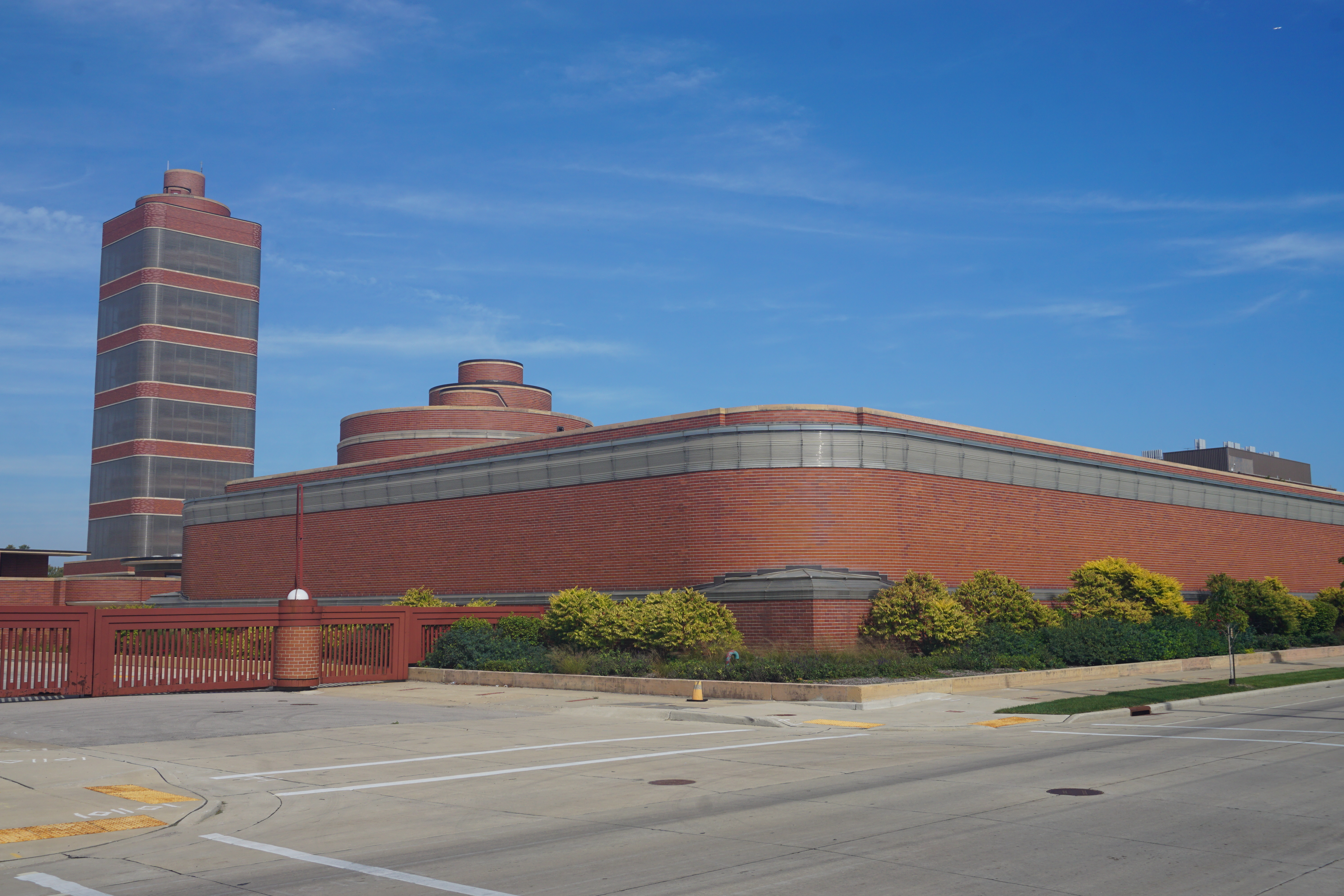
- The headquarters building with tower

- Location within Wisconsin Location within the United States
- Interactive map showing the location of Johnson Wax Headquarters
- Location: 1525 Howe Street, Racine, Wisconsin, U.S.
- Coordinates: 42°42′49″N 87°47′27″W
- Built: 1936–1939 (Administration Building), 1947–1950 (Research Tower)
- Architects: Frank Lloyd Wright, William Wesley Peters
- Architectural style: Streamline Moderne
- NRHP reference No.: 74002275

Significant dates
- Added to NRHP: December 27, 1974
- Designated NHL: January 7, 1976

The Johnson Wax Headquarters is the corporate headquarters of the household goods company S. C. Johnson & Son in Racine, Wisconsin, United States. The original headquarters includes two buildings designed by Frank Lloyd Wright: the Administration Building, completed in April 1939, and the Research Tower, completed in November 1950. The headquarters also includes the Golden Rondelle Theater, relocated from the 1964 New York World's Fair, in addition to Fortaleza Hall and the Commons, a memorial to Samuel Curtis Johnson Jr. Both of the original buildings were widely discussed on their completion, and they have been depicted in several exhibits and media works. In addition, the original headquarters received the American Institute of Architects' Twenty-five Year Award and has been designated as a National Historic Landmark.

S. C. Johnson's chief executive, Herbert Fisk "Hibbert" Johnson Jr., hired Wright to design the Administration Building in 1936 after rejecting an earlier plan by J. Mandor Matson. Construction began that September, though work progressed slowly due to Wright's attention to detail and use of novel construction methods. The Administration Building was well-received upon its opening, undergoing minor modifications over the years. S. C. Johnson rehired Wright in 1945 to design the Research Tower, construction of which began in late 1947. After the Research Tower opened, S. C. Johnson used the structure for research and development (R&D). The Golden Rondelle Theater opened in 1967 as a visitor center for the headquarters. The Research Tower was closed in 1982 due to safety concerns. The Fortaleza Hall was finished in 2010, and the Research Tower partially opened for tours in 2014.

The Johnson Administration Building is designed in a variation of the streamlined Art Moderne style, with a curved brick facade and Pyrex glass-tube windows. The Administration Building's primary interior space is a great workroom with concrete shell columns topped by large "calyxes". The Administration Building also includes offices on a mezzanine and penthouse, in addition to an overpass connecting with a carport; these spaces contain furniture designed by Wright. The Research Tower, a 15-story structure with a brick facade and Pyrex-tube windows, is next to the Administration Building and is surrounded by a courtyard. The tower has alternating square floors and circular mezzanines, cantilevered outward from the structural core.

== Site ==
The Johnson Wax Headquarters is located at 1525 Howe Street in Racine, Wisconsin, United States. The original headquarters comprises two structures, the Administration Building and Research Tower. These occupy a city block bounded by 16th Street to the south, Howe Street to the west, 15th Street to the north, and Franklin Street to the east. The Administration Building occupies a square site measuring 245 feet (75 m) on each side. The Research Tower is immediately to the north of the Administration Building, connected to it by a footbridge. The two original buildings are among five that the American architect Frank Lloyd Wright designed around Racine, the others being Wingspread, the Keland House, and the Hardy House.

=== Related structures ===
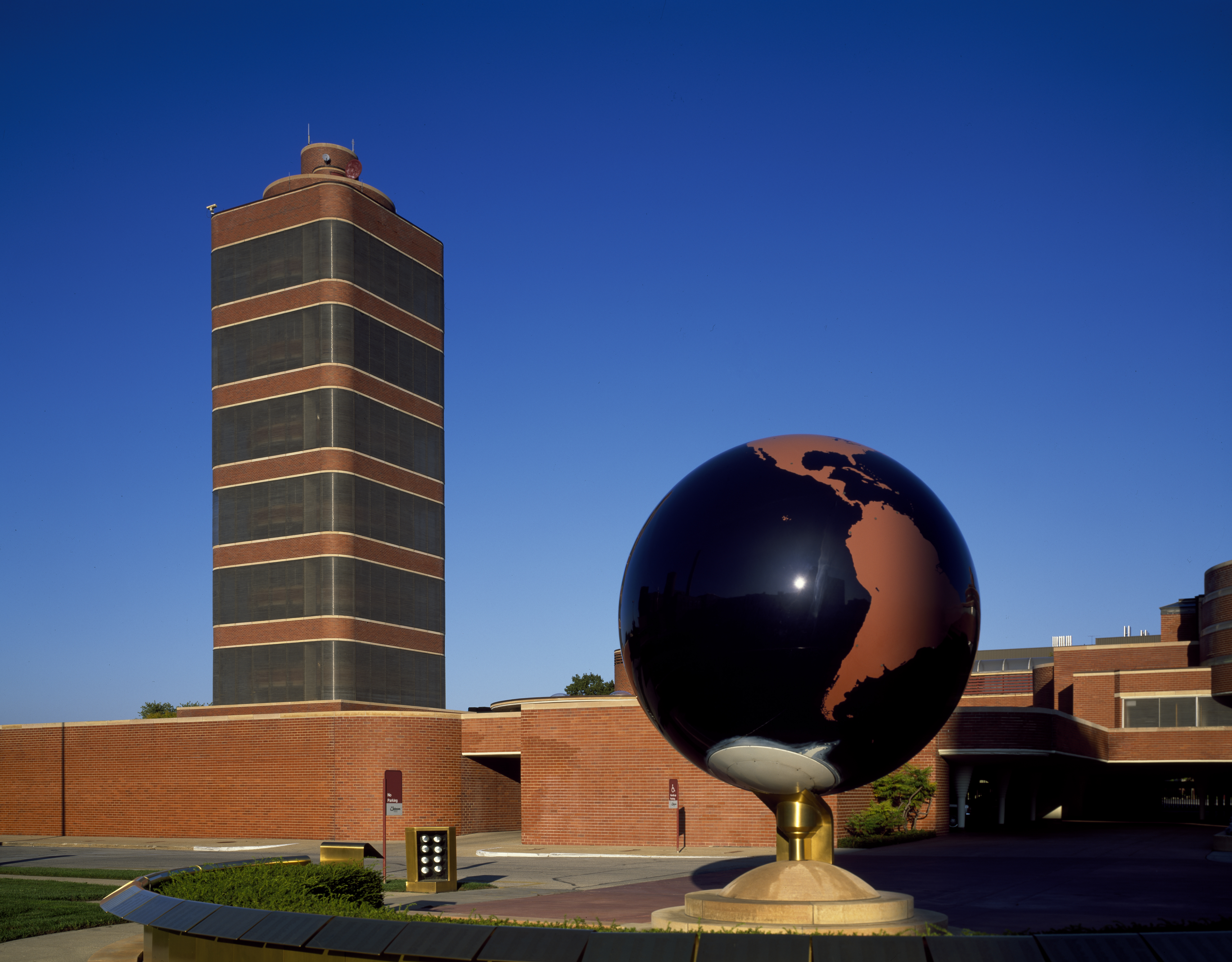
The Johnson Wax Headquarters' Research Tower (left) and Administration Building (bottom). The globe is in the foreground, in front of both buildings.

Just north of the original Johnson Wax Headquarters campus is the Golden Rondelle Theater, near the intersection of 14th and Franklin streets. Designed by Lippincott & Margulies as a 1964 New York World's Fair pavilion, the theater has a saucer-shaped, gold-colored roof supported by six concrete columns. The Golden Rondelle Theater was moved to the Johnson Wax Headquarters after the fair closed. The modern theater has 308 seats and functions as a visitor center for the Johnson Wax Headquarters. Flanking the theater are two brick structures with glass-tube windows, designed by Taliesin Associated Architects; one is a lobby and display area, while the other structure is an exit.

Immediately to the east of the Golden Rondelle Theater, and northeast of the original headquarters, is Fortaleza Hall, which opened in 2010 and was designed by Foster + Partners. The structure was built as a memorial to Samuel Curtis Johnson Jr. the president of the household goods company S. C. Johnson. Its name refers to Samuel Johnson's 1998 trip to Fortaleza, Brazil, which replicated a journey that his father Herbert Fisk "Hibbert" Johnson Jr. had made in 1935. Fortaleza Hall consists of a 60-foot-tall (18 m) spherical atrium with a disc-shaped roof. The facade is made of 85 glass panels measuring 16 by 7.5 feet (4.9 by 2.3 m) across. Inside is a replica of the Sikorsky S-38 plane that Hibbert had flown, a cafeteria, a waterfall, a precast concrete wall with forest motifs, a green wall, and a reading room. There is also a gift shop. Next to it is Waxbird Commons, an office building that opened in 2021; named after S. C. Johnson's Waxbird airplane, it includes green energy features such as a solar roof and geothermal heating.

The campus also includes a plastic globe, the first version of which was built in 1954. The globe contained plastic markers denoting the locations of S. C. Johnson's offices and distributors around the world. According to the Racine Journal Times, the globe was the largest of its kind in the world when it was built, with a circumference of 35 feet (11 m). The globe, designed by Rand McNally and built by the Steiner Plastics Company, was tilted at a 23.5-degree angle and is illuminated by neon tubes. The outer portion of the globe was supported by a steel frame measuring 9 feet (2.7 m) across. The current globe, installed in 1986, is similar in design to the original globe, rotating once every 24 minutes.

== History ==
S. C. Johnson & Son was founded in Racine, Wisconsin, in 1886 and expanded rapidly in the late 19th and early 20th centuries. By 1936, some of the company's executives worked in a wooden house and a series of annexes next to the company's existing factory and warehouse. Hibbert Johnson initially wanted to expand the existing buildings before deciding on an entirely new campus. Samuel Johnson later reflected that his father "was tired of us being seen as a little old family enterprise in a little town in the Midwest".

=== Original building ===
==== Design ====
Before starting his new building, Hibbert visited The Hershey Company's headquarters in Hershey, Pennsylvania, for inspiration. At the time, Hershey had just completed an air-conditioned office building, and S. C. Johnson's existing building lacked air conditioning, forcing the factory to close whenever temperatures exceeded 90 °F (32 °C). Upon his return to Racine, Hibbert hired J. Mandor Matson to design an office building near S. C. Johnson's existing headquarters. S. C. Johnson bought land immediately to the east of its existing headquarters and razed the houses there. Matson's first proposal from 1935 called for a T-shaped building, with the stem of the T running south toward 16th Street. The plans called for a Beaux-Arts structure with six niches depicting the history of S. C. Johnson's wax products. The initial drawings had few windows, if at all, and a revised blueprint from 1936 included windows. Hibbert was unimpressed with the plans, as was S. C. Johnson's general manager Jack Ramsey, who said Matson's plan "isn't good enough, it's just another building". Ramsey and S. C. Johnson's advertising manager, William Connolly, were also unable to suggest suitable revisions.

Hibbert and Ramsey decided to expand their search for an architect. Hibbert gave Matson's drawings to his brother-in-law Jack Louis, an executive at the public-relations firm that handled advertisements for S. C. Johnson. Louis's colleagues Melvin Brorby and E. Willis Jones, who also disliked the design, recommended another architect, who in turn recommended that Hibbert and Ramsey reach out to Frank Lloyd Wright. Jones visited Wright's Taliesin studio in Spring Green, Wisconsin, twice in July 1936 to discuss the proposed building, whereupon Wright characterized Matson's design as a crematorium. That month, Hibbert went to Taliesin to talk with the architect. Despite their personal disagreements, Hibbert asked Wright to design a headquarters for S. C. Johnson & Son in Racine, The architect offered to design a building costing $200,000 (much less than what Matson was asking), and he charged a commission equivalent to 10% of the construction cost.

Wright promised that "the Johnson Administration Building is not going to be what you expect", and he sought to design a structure that would stimulate workers, rather than being merely satisfying. Wright replaced Matson as the architect in late July 1936, less than a month before construction was supposed to begin; it was the first major commission given to Wright's Taliesin Fellowship. Hibbert's daughter Karen reported being elated that her father had decided to hire Wright. Shortly afterward, Wright visited the site that S. C. Johnson had acquired in Racine. At the time, the site had a series of wood-frame houses, a few small stores, and a cinema. The site of the new headquarters had been cleared by late August 1936. Wright's plans for the Johnson Administration Building were based on his earlier, unbuilt design for the Capital Journal offices in Salem, Oregon, which included a series of mushroom–shaped columns and translucent walls.

Wright tried to convince the company to relocate to the Racine suburbs, as he wanted to incorporate his proposals for Broadacre City into the S. C. Johnson complex. Ramsey and Connolly were vehemently against the idea, but Wright continued to promote it until his wife Olgivanna warned that S. C. Johnson might fire him, too. Instead, Wright's team drew up plans at Taliesin for an Administration Building in Racine. Two of Wright's apprentices, John Howe and William Wesley Peters, recalled that Wright rushed to draw his ideas but that he also focused on perfecting the building's geometry, particularly the grids of columns. Wright allocated space to each of S. C. Johnson's departments based on what each department needed. On August 9, 1936, ten days after he was hired, Wright went to Racine to show the plans to Hibbert and other S. C. Johnson officials. Hibbert requested two changes to the plans, although he retained Wright's draft plan for the most part. By the end of the month, Wright asked three apprentices to create a model of the building.

==== Initial work and delays ====
Hibbert Johnson suggested that his good friend Ben Wiltscheck be hired as the building's general contractor. Wright, who was typically adversarial toward contractors, saw Wiltscheck as "good help for us in getting this building properly built". By September 1936, preliminary work on the site had begun, and Peters and Mendel Glickman finalized the building's structural details. Apprentices at Taliesin created 18 to 20 drawings, many of which depicted the building's great workroom, a relatively simple space. Wright continued to refine the drawings as construction proceeded. Concurrently, Wright's apprentice Robert Mosher had been overseeing the construction of Fallingwater, Edgar J. Kaufmann's country estate in Pennsylvania, when Wright forced Mosher to return to Wisconsin after a dispute involving reinforcing steel. Mosher was instead appointed to oversee the construction of the S. C. Johnson Administration Building, while another apprentice, Edgar Tafel, took Mosher's place in Pennsylvania.

Wiltscheck and Mosher worked out of a nearby shack. Wright visited a few times a month, sometimes bringing food and drinks for workers. The Wisconsin Industrial Commission refused to approve plans for various aspects of the building, citing building-code violations, but ultimately approved most of these plans with few changes. The commission withheld its approval of the building's columns; in particular, inspectors felt that the columns were too thin to support the 12-short-ton (11-long-ton; 11 t) loads that had been indicated in Glickman's drawings. In the meantime, work continued. To provide space for a car-wash area and a squash court, S. C. Johnson bought a plot north of the Administration Building that November. By the end of the year, the building's estimated cost had increased to $300,000. Wright, who had designed just two buildings in the previous half-decade, had severely underestimated the materials and labor expenses.

Construction briefly stalled in late 1936 after Wright caught pneumonia, rendering him unable to answer contractors' questions. In addition, fourteen footings had to be rebuilt to accommodate the weight of a planned footbridge and squash court. Mosher returned to Pennsylvania in January 1937 to supervise Fallingwater, and Tafel was appointed as the Johnson Administration Building's supervisor. Tafel lived in a former bar across from the Administration Building's site, playing an organ as entertainment. The same month, S. C. Johnson bought a parcel immediately northwest of the Administration Building, as Ramsey wanted to construct a truck-repair garage there. Wright agreed to expand the roof of the Administration Building's carport above this new garage. Not all of Wright's proposals for the building were implemented; for example, Hibbert rejected a proposed pipe organ in the great workroom.

==== Structural tests, delays, and completion ====
Shorter columns in the carport

Comparatively little progress occurred in 1937, in part because of Wright's extreme attention to detail and in part because some of the construction methods he used were entirely brand-new. In several instances, Wright finalized plans for certain parts of the building as they were being constructed. Wright created detailed drawings for the columns in the great workroom in early 1937, only to redesign the columns when the drawings were nearly finished. He spent one year adjusting the details of glass tubes that were to be installed on the facade. Meanwhile, state officials refused to approve the columns because they were not of sufficient thickness. As such, Wright decided to build one prototype column and place progressively heavier loads onto it. The concrete for the column was poured in late May, and Wright began testing the column that June. The column was able to withstand a load of 60 short tons (54 long tons; 54 t) before it showed any strain, at which point Wright ordered workers to pull down the column. Afterward, state officials finally gave Wright permission to build the columns. Work on the Johnson Administration Building was accelerated, and laborers began laying masonry.

Wiltscheck reported in June 1937 that the building was half-completed, and by that August, some of the walls had been finished. Work had to be halted in late October 1937 after Wright, with little warning, revised plans for the squash court and the cafeteria–theater space. The building's exterior was being completed by January 1938, but work on the interior finishes had not started because the HVAC systems had to be built first. The estimated cost had increased to $450,000 by then. During early 1938, Wright refined his plans for the interiors while at Taliesin West, his studio in Arizona. After Corning Glass began delivering Pyrex glass tubes for the building's facade, disagreements emerged over who should install the glass tubes. Progress was further delayed by labor strikes during early 1938; for example, laborers called a strike to demand higher wages, and material deliveries were delayed when truckers went on strike. Although Wiltscheck and Wright's apprentices all raised concerns about the use of Pyrex tubes for the skylights, which they claimed would leak, Wright refused to consider alternative materials. Hibbert secretly ordered standard glass skylights anyway; Tafel told Wright about this change, and Hibbert fired Tafel in retaliation. Hibbert eventually agreed to rehire Tafel and use Pyrex skylights after Wright threatened to resign over this dispute.

The iron pipes in the floors were installed in April 1938, followed by the pouring of concrete floor slabs during June and July. Contractors used a "pumpcrete" machine to pour 20 to 22 cubic yards (15 to 17 m^{3}) an hour. Peters recalled that, just before the second floor was ready to be poured, he had to reinforce some of the first-floor columns after discovering that Wright had made a last-minute change to the placement of the second-floor columns. Olgivanna Wright recalled that her husband had become increasingly agitated because contractors and laborers requested constant clarifications on various aspects of the project. S. C. Johnson's board of directors, who were also displeased at the slow pace of construction, stopped paying Wright and Wiltscheck. Wright postponed a trip to England so he could oversee the building's construction. By that December, Wright was again ill with pneumonia, and the opening of the building had been postponed to early the next year. Workers began painting the columns and installing interior partitions in January 1939, and construction workers were invited to preview the building's interiors the next month. Having completed the Administration Building, Hibbert asked Wright to design the Wingspread mansion outside of Racine, which was also completed in 1939.

==== Opening ====
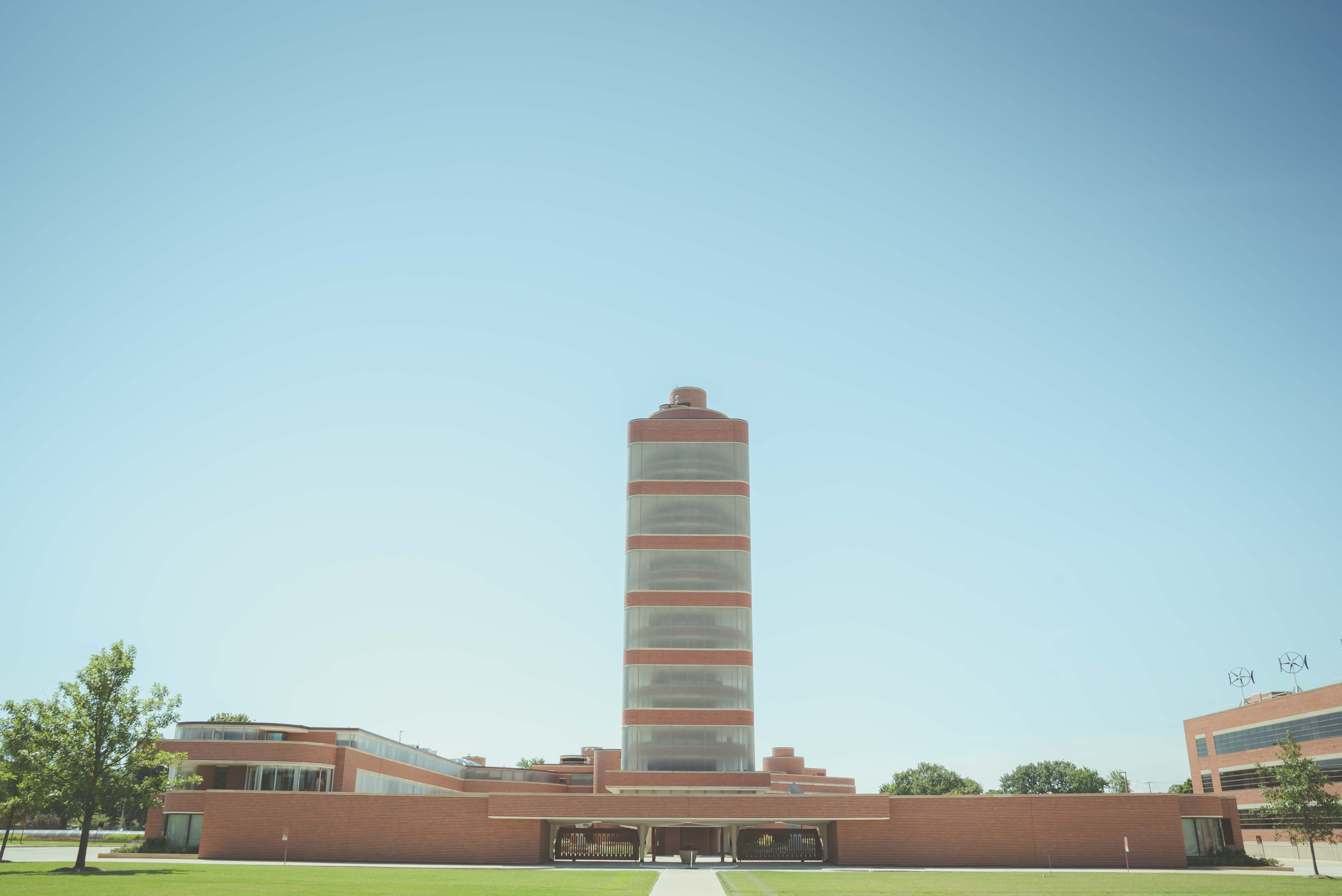
Research Tower above the Administration Building, 2016

S. C. Johnson employees began moving into the new offices at the end of March 1939. The building had exceeded its original budget considerably; (Note: Its cost was variously estimated at $900,000, $1 million, $1.11 million, or $3 million.) Fisk Johnson, one of S. C. Johnson's subsequent chief executives, estimated that the structure's cost was half of the company's entire net worth. Local Boy Scouts, Cub Scouts, and Sea Scouts members were invited to greet people for the building's official opening that April. Around 23,000 or 26,000 members of the public visited the building on April 23, 1939, constituting more than a third of Racine's population at the time. Prince Frederik IX and Princess Ingrid of Denmark visited it on a private tour the next day. The Johnson Administration Building also attracted other visitors, including a wide variety of architects and the animator Walt Disney (who was an acquaintance of Wright's).

The caulking between the Administration Building's Pyrex glass tubes began to peel off after it was completed, causing leaks, which continued for several years. Glass tubes sometimes fell from the ceiling as well, and because the great workroom's light bulbs were wedged between the glass tubes, workers needed to remove the tubes with a special scaffold every time they had to replace the light bulbs. Conversely, the Administration Building's structural system experienced no structural failures, except for the carport's roof, which was repaired in 1941 after it sagged.

=== Research Tower expansion ===
==== Planning ====
By 1943, S. C. Johnson's research department had 25 workers, who were split across two buildings. That year, the research department's director J. Vernon Steinle submitted a memo to Hibbert in which he outlined what he wanted in a laboratory building. Hibbert, who liked the idea, forwarded Steinle's memo to Wright. Hibbert wanted to avoid experimental design details, a main source of delays in the Administration Building's construction. Sources disagree over whether Wright or Hibbert had suggested developing a tower instead of a conventional low-rise building. Wright's initial plans for the research building called for a 18-story tower, with a hollow core in a fashion similar to Buckminster Fuller's 4D Apartment Tower and Dymaxion houses. The building would have two small elevators and two small stairs, later combined into one larger stair and elevator each. The cantilevered floor slabs in the plans had been influenced by his proposal for unbuilt apartment buildings at St. Mark's Church in-the-Bowery in New York City. Additionally, there were to be a courtyard around the tower, a two-story "U"-shaped building surrounding the courtyard, and footbridges connecting the Administration Building and the Research Tower.

Wright continued to fine-tune his design for the Research Tower during 1944, and he briefly considered constructing the tower to the west of the Administration Building, across Howe Street. By that September, Wright's plans called for a 16-story tower and two additional stories above the existing carport. Hibbert signed off on the revised plans in November 1944. Steinle, who was tasked with determining how the equipment would be laid out, commissioned a scale model of the proposed tower. Ben Wiltscheck agreed to be rehired as the tower's general contractor. William Wesley Peters was responsible for the tower's structural calculations, a particularly difficult task for him, as no similar structure had been built before. Work on the plans was delayed in 1945, as Wright had not finalized his drawings, thus preventing Peters and the tower's mechanical engineer from preparing their respective drawings. That August, Samuel Lewis was hired as the mechanical engineer. Some parts of the tower were redesigned after Lewis found that there was not enough space for utilities in some parts of the building.

S. C. Johnson announced in November 1945 that they had rehired Wright to design a 15-story laboratory tower next to the Administration Building. Sketches of the laboratory tower were displayed in Milwaukee, and further details of the building were revealed in March 1946. These plans called for a 150-foot-tall (46 m) laboratory tower and several ancillary structures hosting various S. C. Johnson departments. Meanwhile, Wright and S. C. Johnson negotiated the architect's fee and the cost of the building. Wright had estimated in 1944 that the building would cost $750,000, although official building permits from 1947 listed the tower's cost as $1.3 million. S. C. Johnson ultimately agreed in 1948 to pay Wright based on a cost estimate of $2 million, with the stipulation that Wright not receive further compensation if construction went over budget.

==== Construction ====
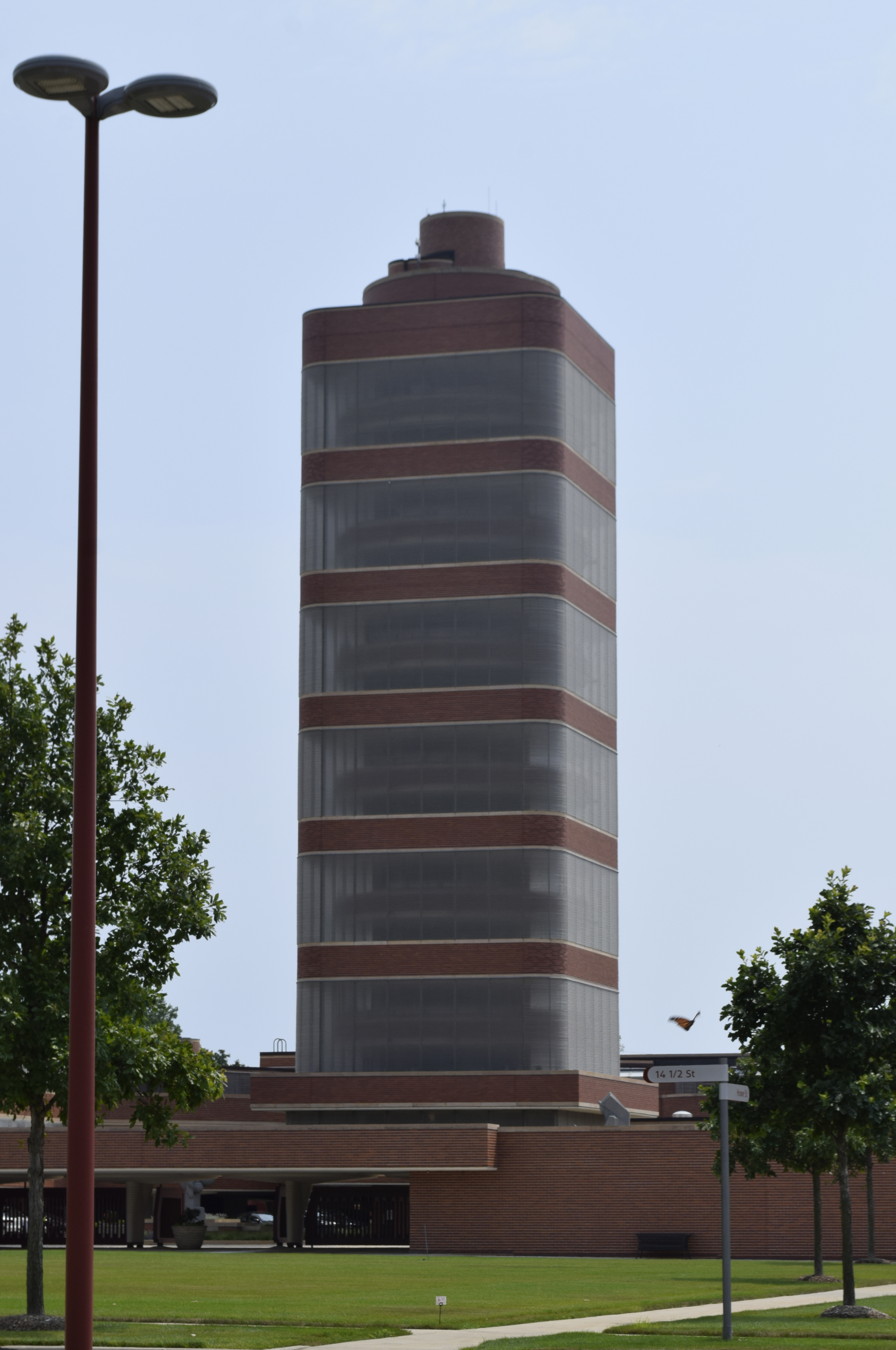
The Research Tower, seen from the north on Howe Street

Work on the Research Tower was delayed because the federal Civilian Production Administration, which reviewed industrial projects after World War II, would not approve the structure. S. C. Johnson received partial approval for the tower only after lobbying from U.S. Representative Lawrence H. Smith. At the end of August 1947, S. C. Johnson awarded the general contract to Wiltscheck & Nelson, a joint venture between Ben Wiltscheck and local firm Nelson Incorporated. A groundbreaking ceremony was hosted for the Research Tower on November 6, 1947, just over two months later. By January 1948, workers were nearly finished excavating the research tower's site and were pouring foundations for an extension to the carport. Laborers dug the foundation for the tower's core partially by hand, and a crane operator excavated other parts of the core's foundation with the help of a periscope and a mirror. The foundation was poured that February; according to one magazine, the project involved the largest continuous concrete pour in Wisconsin at the time.

Laborers began pouring the floor slabs for the tower in mid-1948. Separate wooden formwork was built for the square main stories and the circular mezzanines; to create the hollow floor slabs, the concrete for each story was poured in two sections. The lowest story took seven weeks to pour, but workers became more efficient at pouring concrete as the structure ascended, eventually pouring one floor every three weeks. Two of the tower's floors had been completed by the end of 1948, a year after the groundbreaking ceremony. Because laborers had difficulties using the pumpcrete machine, they instead used conventional mixers on the ground. Further delays were incurred because the concrete had to be poured with as few deformities or inaccuracies as possible. As such, concrete work did not reach the fifteenth floor until mid-1949; the concrete frame topped out that October.

The Research Tower was built without a fire sprinkler system, as Wright disliked the sprinklers' appearance, though S. C. Johnson's insurance company threatened not to insure the tower unless it had sprinklers. Hibbert agreed to pay an increased insurance premium in exchange for not adding fire sprinklers. Wright also thought up ways to prevent the Research Tower's Pyrex windows from leaking. As a temporary measure, wooden sheeting was placed around the building in late 1949 while the Pyrex tubes were being delivered. After the laboratory equipment was delivered in April 1950, workers installed the equipment and the glass at the same time. By October 1950, the tower was nearly complete, and S. C. Johnson was sending out invitations to the tower's opening ceremony. The tower was dedicated on November 17, 1950. Hundreds of guests, including scientists, educators, and industrialists, were invited to the ceremony, where Wright said that "the building speaks eloquently for itself".

=== 1950s to 1960s ===
After the Research Tower was opened, S. C. Johnson began using the structure for research and development (R&D). The writer Jonathan Lipman reflected that the Research Tower's design had increased morale among chemists who shared space there. In the first decade of the tower's operations, scientists developed products such as furniture polish, insect repellent, air freshener, and insecticide. In 1954, S. C. Johnson erected a large plastic globe outside the headquarters, serving as a corporate symbol. Meanwhile, thousands of people toured the Administration Building annually, particularly during the weekends; on some days, the building accommodated up to 300 visitors. Although many visitors came from the nearby cities of Chicago and Milwaukee, people came from world, particularly members of women's groups and architecture fans. People visiting other manufacturing companies in the area often stopped by the Johnson Wax buildings, and politicians such as Wisconsin governor Walter J. Kohler Jr. and U.S. Supreme Court Chief Justice Earl Warren sometimes made visits.

Steinle and another S. C. Johnson chemist, Edward Wilder, recalled that each pair of stories in the Research Tower was equivalent to five laboratories, but they also said that chemists often waited until after work to chat with colleagues on different floors because they did not want to wait for the tower's only elevator. The R&D department quickly outgrew its space, prompting S. C. Johnson to convert the carport into an enclosed laboratory in 1957. The same year, parts of the Administration Building's skylights were replaced with corrugated plastic. Additionally, the structure's glass-tube windows experienced the same kinds of leaks that had occurred at the Administration Building. S. C. Johnson announced in 1959 that it would expand the headquarters' R&D department. After Wright's death that year, William Wesley Peters (who by then led Wright's successor firm, Taliesin Associated Architects) was hired to design an expansion to the east of the tower's carport. The annex was completed in 1961.

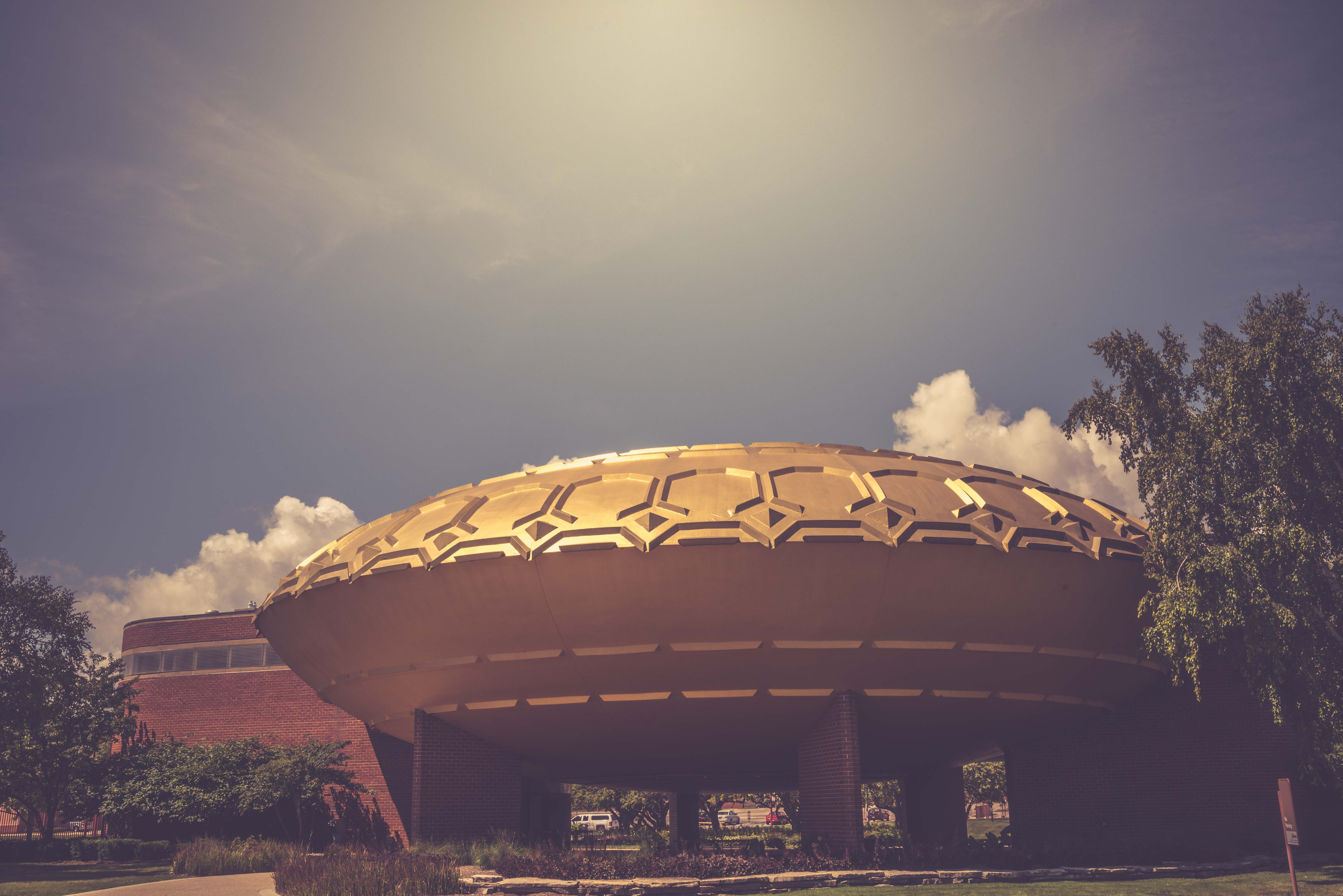
In 1966, the Golden Rondelle Theater of the 1964 New York World's Fair was rebuilt next to the Johnson Wax Headquarters.

S. C. Johnson hired the Carrier Corporation in 1964 to install a thermoelectric cooling system with 28 air conditioners, which lacked the refrigerant and compressor coils found in typical air-cooling systems. After the end of the 1964 New York World's Fair, the Golden Rondelle Theater was relocated to the Johnson Wax Headquarters in 1966. The land to the north of the existing headquarters was acquired and cleared to make way for the theater, and two pavilion structures, also designed by Taliesin Associated Architects, were built next to it. The theater was rededicated in July 1967; it initially hosted screenings of the film To Be Alive!, as well as S. C. Johnson meetings. By then, the Johnson Wax Headquarters accommodated over 9,000 annual visitors. Meanwhile, S. C. Johnson's business continued to grow over the years, prompting the company to construct additional offices outside Racine in the late 1960s. Taliesin Associated Architects oversaw other minor changes to the two original buildings over the years. The Research Tower's floors were originally painted red, but over the years, each pair of floors was repainted in different colors to distinguish them.

=== 1970s to 1990s ===
S. C. Johnson hired Llewelyn Davies Associates in 1969 to create plans for redeveloping the area around the Johnson Wax Headquarters. The plan was released in 1970 and called for several buildings immediately north of the headquarters, such as an employee cafeteria, a workshop and maintenance building, a public exhibition building, a parking garage. The plan also called for a public park around the Golden Rondelle Theater and housing north of the theater. The company continued to grow, prompting S. C. Johnson to ask four firms to design an expansion of the headquarters in the 1970s, although none of these designs were used. During the 1970s, the carpet in the Administration Building's workroom was changed, and laborers added and renovated offices in the workroom's mezzanine. S. C. Johnson also added fire partitions in the Research Tower. The company considered adding a second staircase to the tower but ultimately decided against it.

In 1977, S. C. Johnson bought the 300,000-square-foot (28,000 m^{2}) St. Mary's Hospital building, immediately to the east of the headquarters, for $1.5 million. The company constructed a tunnel from the original headquarters to the hospital, which was renamed the East Complex. S. C. Johnson subsequently moved several departments from the original headquarters to the hospital. Due to safety concerns, the Research Tower was largely abandoned in 1982 after S. C. Johnson relocated its research facilities to another building. The company retained some offices on the tower's second story. By that decade, the Golden Rondelle Theater had become a visitor center for the headquarters, which had 15,000 annual visitors. A plastic globe outside the headquarters was installed in 1986 to replace the original globe. S. C. Johnson also wanted to repurpose the tower, though these plans were ultimately dropped because it could not meet modern building codes without undergoing significant design changes. The tower's facade was cleaned in 1987, and S. C. Johnson celebrated the Administration Building's 50th anniversary in 1989.

The Administration Building remained largely unchanged into the 1990s, though the desks had been modified to accommodate computers. The director of the company's guest relations department claimed that the Johnson Administration Building was one of a few Wright–designed structures that was still being used for its original purpose. Despite widespread architectural acclaim, the Administration Building continued to experience maintenance issues; the roof often leaked, and maintenance costs were 25% higher than at similarly sized buildings. S. C. Johnson policy prevented its executives from making major changes to the design. The company was unable to install sound-absorbing panels, nor could it equip the mezzanine with telecommunications wires, and employees brought in doctors' notes recommending against the use of Wright's chairs. By the late 1990s, S. C. Johnson executives privately considered moving some of the headquarters functions to Chicago due to the lack of qualified executives in Racine.

=== 2000s to present ===
The Administration Building's theater/cafeteria was turned into a conference area around 2001, and the Research Tower was again cleaned that year. Following Sam Johnson's death in 2004, his son Fisk Johnson announced that he would construct a memorial to his father, with a replica of a plane that Sam Johnson had flown to Brazil in 1998. Fisk hired Foster and Partners to design the building, known as "Project Honor", in 2006; the new structure would host the headquarters' cafeteria and other meeting spaces. Work on the new structure, later known as Fortaleza Hall, began in September 2007. The replica plane was installed in 2009, and Fortaleza Hall opened next to the original headquarters campus in January 2010. The S. C. Johnson Gallery, an exhibition space within Fortaleza Hall, opened in 2012.

During the early 2010s, S. C. Johnson renovated the tower as part of a $30 million refurbishment project, and it replaced the bricks and glass tubes on the tower's facade. In 2013, S. C. Johnson announced plans to open the Research Tower to the public for the first time, and two of the tower's floors were restored to their 1950s appearance. The tower was relit on December 21, 2013, when the renovations were nearly completed. The Research Tower opened to the public on May 2, 2014, hosting tours three days a week. The third floor and third mezzanine contain various props, including beakers, scales, centrifuges, archival photographs, and letters. S. C. Johnson also announced in 2014 that it would spend another $1.5 million renovating the headquarters' offices.

For its restoration of the tower, S. C. Johnson received a Spirit Award from the Frank Lloyd Wright Building Conservancy. The Johnson Wax Headquarters was subsequently added to the Frank Lloyd Wright Trail. S. C. Johnson retrofitted the headquarters with a geothermal energy system in 2019. The Waxbird Commons office building also opened on the campus in 2021.

== Administration Building ==
The Johnson Administration Building was one of three major buildings that Frank Lloyd Wright designed in the 1930s; the other two were Fallingwater in Stewart Township, Pennsylvania, and Herbert Jacobs's first house in Madison, Wisconsin. Similar to Wright's earlier Larkin Administration Building in Buffalo, New York, the Johnson Administration Building was intended to draw occupants' attention inward, rather than outward. The historian Robert McCarter wrote that S. C. Johnson and the Larkin Company both had "enlightened management" who aimed to better their employees' lives, thus making Wright the ideal architect for the Johnson Administration Building. Wright referred to the Larkin Building as the "masculine sire" to the Johnson Building, which he saw as more feminine due to its curves.

=== Exterior ===
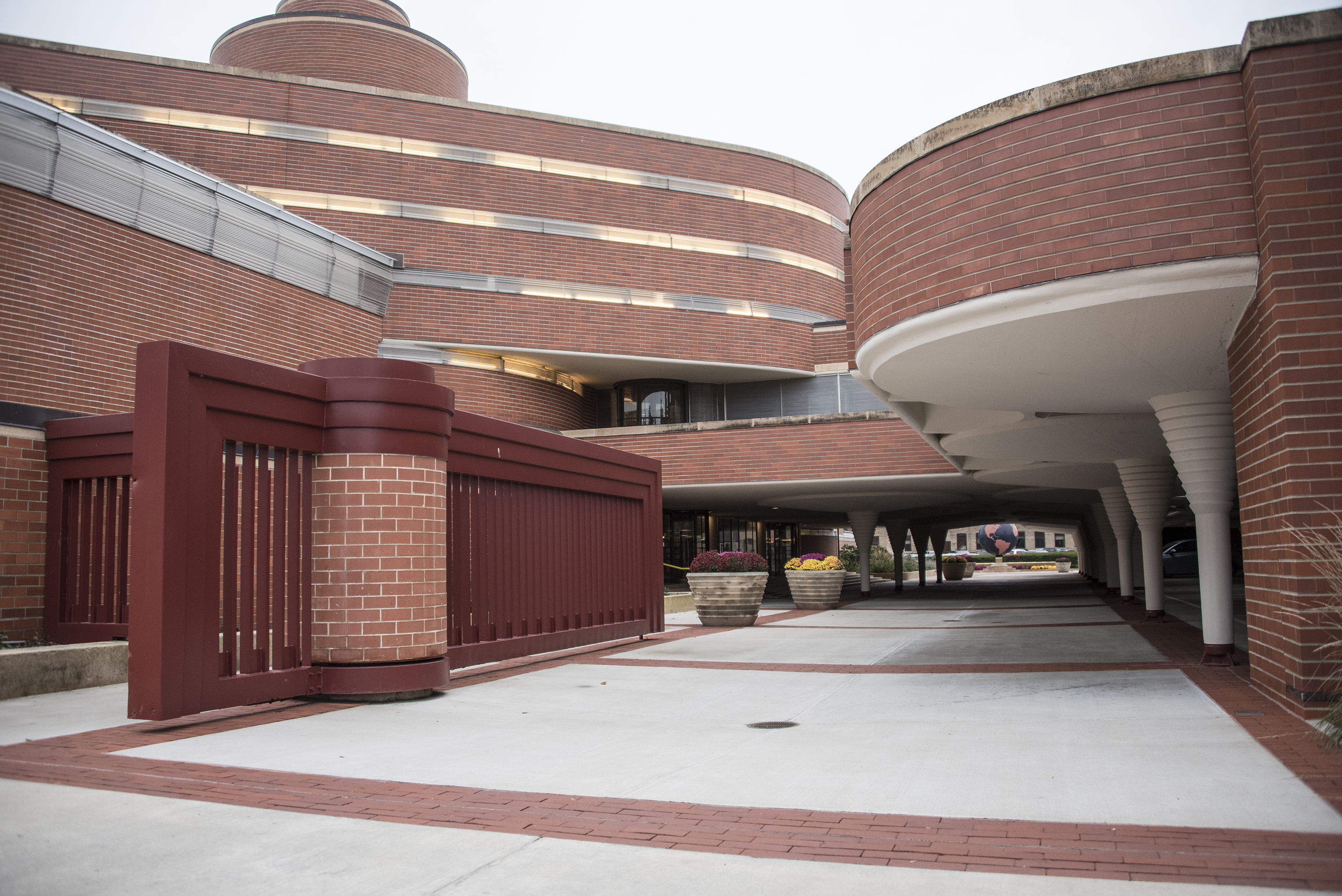
The Administration Building seen from the east, looking toward the overpass between the main building and its carport. The building itself is to the left, and the carport is to the right.

The original building is designed in a variation of the streamlined Art Moderne style. Wright, who felt that many modern–style buildings were "not really modern", devised plans for a low-lying, streamlined structure. The facade is made of brick, tinted in a Cherokee red hue and manufactured in Streator, Illinois. The bricks were made in 200 distinct shapes. The bricks are alternately laid 5 or 8 inches (130 or 200 mm) apart, with blocks of cork placed between the bricks. Concrete was poured into the gaps between the bricks and cork, while steel rods and copper ties were added for reinforcement. Each horizontal course of bricks measures 3.5 inches (89 mm) high. Surplus bricks from the project were used in the first Herbert Jacobs House in Madison.

For the most part, the building lacks windows and other openings. The facade uses 43 miles (69 km) of Pyrex glass tubes, manufactured by Corning Glass in New York. Two bands of Pyrex tubes cross the facade horizontally: one band approximately 6 feet (1.8 m) above the ground, and the other at the cornice immediately below the roof. The Pyrex tubes function as clerestory windows, and they distort natural light, preventing occupants from looking out into the neighborhood and vice versa. Several diameters of tubes are used. Each band consists of multiple tubes stacked atop each other, which are placed on aluminum racks and bound using wires. The gaps between the tubes created shadows, which gave the impression of alternating light-colored and dark bands. Since the building was equipped with an air-conditioning system from the outset, the glass tubes were not designed to be movable. One unintended effect of the Pyrex tubes was that they focused light onto certain parts of the great workroom, creating glare.

The entrance faces S. C. Johnson's parking lot to the north, away from 16th Street, which was more industrial in nature. The building had no exits to the east, south, and west, as Wright had convinced the state's industrial commission that the structure was completely fireproof. Instead, a 18.5-foot-wide (5.6 m) planting strip surrounds the building on these sides. The facade originally did not contain any public-facing signage, although a small sign was mounted on the northern elevation of the building's carport, facing the parking lot. Robert Mosher, who thought Wright would reject any suggestions for signage on the facade, reportedly told Hibbert and S. C. Johnson's board of directors that the building "is going to be such a contribution that you won't need any sign". Between the main building and its carport is a driveway for visitors. To the right of the main entrance is a red tile on which Wright signed his initials.

=== Interior ===
The Administration Building's interior covers 54,000 square feet (5,000 m^{2}) and consists of a great workroom, as well as offices on a mezzanine and in a penthouse. For the most part, the building lacked hallways because Wright wanted people to circulate vertically between floors, rather than horizontally across a single floor. This also reduced the amount of unused "dead space" in the building. The mezzanine and penthouse are accessed by a pair of elevators, which are made of cylindrical bronze cages. The hydraulic elevators can carry up to 1,000 pounds (450 kg) and are operated from an electric control panel in the basement. There is also a pair of cylindrical staircase halls flanking the main lobby, and several spiraling iron staircases connect the mezzanine to the main level.

Two circular ventilation shafts extend the building's full height, eliminating the need for air ducts on the roof. The presence of the shafts led Wright to describe the building as breathing through two "nostrils". Air filters, compressors, and fans were installed at the bottom of each shaft. Filtered air was distributed via a plenum chamber under the workroom's mezzanine. Heating pipes, made of wrought iron, are embedded into the concrete floor slabs. The heating system, divided into six sectors that could operate independently, was an early example of a radiant heating system. By the 21st century, heating was provided by ventilation ducts, while the original heating pipes were used as telecommunications conduits. The foundation consists of reinforced concrete footers measuring 18.5 inches (470 mm) thick, beneath which is an 18-inch (460 mm) layer of crushed stone. The drinking fountains were surrounded by flower bowls.

==== Great workroom ====
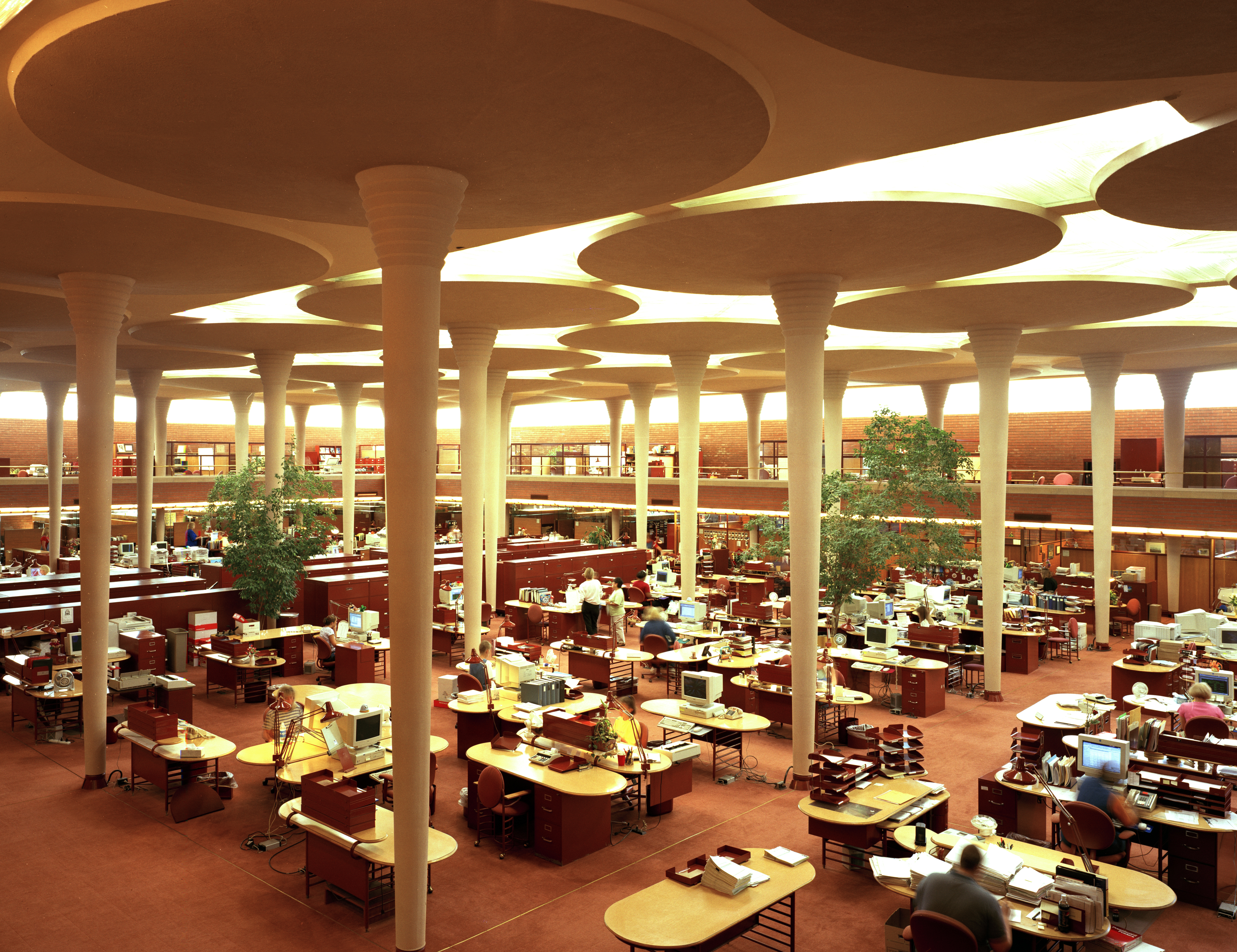
Great Workroom

Wright decided to put all clerical staff in the great workroom, measuring about 130 by 210 feet (40 by 64 m). (Note: Multiple sources give a more precise size of 128 by 208 feet (39 by 63 m). McCarter 1997, p. 283, gives different dimensions of 120 by 200 feet (37 by 61 m).) Its design was heavily based on that of Wright's Capital Journal headquarters in Oregon. The interior primarily uses concrete, though some brick was also used. The floor is covered with rubber tiles, which are painted a Cherokee red. S. C. Johnson keeps a collection of Cherokee-red tiles in case the floor tiles need to be replaced. The great workroom is illuminated by rooftop skylights and by the facade's glass bands, in addition to artificial lighting. Wooden blinds are installed in front of the Pyrex glass tubes to reduce glare.

The room is arranged in an open plan, with space for around 200 desks. When it was completed, the room was large enough to host meetings for S. C. Johnson's entire workforce, including laborers at nearby factories. Departments with related functions were placed next to each other. For example, the billing and credit departments worked in the western portion of the room, while the outgoing mail, records, and sales departments worked in the eastern portion. Tafel described the great workroom as "the first landscaped office" because of the flexible interior layout. The great workroom is surrounded by a 17-foot-deep (5.2 m) mezzanine with offices for departmental heads and junior executives. Offices occupy the outermost 14 feet (4.3 m) of the mezzanine, while a corridor protrudes 3 feet (0.91 m) inward. The mezzanine included offices for the cost, accounting, and traffic departments, in addition to an office for S. C. Johnson's assistant treasurer. In addition to individual filing rooms for each department, there was storage space for S. C. Johnson's general files under the southern end of the mezzanine. Mail equipment was placed under the eastern part of the mezzanine. Cork boards were installed under the mezzanine to dampen sound.

The great workroom's ceiling is supported by 60 columns, (Note: When the building was being designed, news sources reported that Wright had drawn up plans for 82 or 86 columns.) a number deliberately selected by Wright to avoid asymmetry. Wright, who described the columns as "dendriform", had intended for the columns' design to emphasize the interiors, rather than merely serving a utilitarian function. The columns are spaced 20 feet (6.1 m) apart, forming a grid. At the bottom of each column is a footer with steel ribs. The columns consist of 2-to-3-inch-thick (5.1 to 7.6 cm) concrete shells surrounding a hollow shaft, the concrete shells have steel mesh cores for added strength. The columns are made of Portland cement and can carry loads of up to 7,000 pounds per square inch (48,000 kPa), higher than what Wright had specified. (Note: The concrete in the petals and calyxes was rated at 4,000 pounds per square inch (28,000 kPa), while the concrete in the shafts was rated at 6,000 pounds per square inch (41,000 kPa).) In contrast to typical columns, they are narrower at their bases and wider at their tops. The bottoms of each column measure 9 inches (23 cm) in diameter, while their tops are about 1 foot 5 inches (0.43 m) wide. The columns are cited as measuring 21 feet (6.4 m), 21 feet 7 1/2 inches (6.591 m), or 22 feet (6.7 m) tall. (Note: ArchDaily gives a differing figure of 30 feet (9.1 m).) Because of their shape, the columns have been compared to lily pads, golf tees, and ice cream cones. The great workroom's lobby, to the north, has columns measuring over 30 feet (9.1 m) tall.

Above each column is a "calyx", which measures 18.5 feet (222 in; 560 cm) in diameter. Hollow pads with concrete rings and struts, which Wright referred to as "petals", stand atop each of the calyxes. There are circular concrete slabs above each of the petals, as well as above the lobby columns. The roof above the workroom is composed of small beams that connect the petals, thereby forming a rigid frame. There are skylights in the spaces between the calyxes. Because there is nothing above much of the great workroom, most of the columns had to support only the weight of a 20-by-20-foot (6.1 by 6.1 m) section of roof, plus any snow that accumulated on the roof. The ceiling is angled to absorb sound. The skylights were originally made of Pyrex tubes but have since been replaced with corrugated plastic sheets.

==== Other spaces ====
The building's basement has service spaces such as lockers, restrooms, and rest areas, which are accessed via circular stairs. The great workroom is connected to the building's carport by an overpass at the second and third stories. The theater, located on the second story of the overpass, contains a projection booth and a dining–kitchen area to the north, as well as a podium to the south. The theater can accommodate 250 people. Senior executives and S. C. Johnson officers worked in the penthouse. The penthouse consists of two wings connected by a central conference room: one wing for S. C. Johnson's operations division, and one for the advertising and media division. Hibbert Johnson's office was located between the wings, to the north of the conference room. Writers described the executive offices as having no locks.

Like the great workroom, the interior of the carport is placed on a grid of columns spaced 20 feet apart. The carport columns are shorter versions of the columns that appear in the great workroom, measuring only 8.5 feet (2.6 m) tall. Since 1957, the carport has been a laboratory. The roof of the carport originally functioned as a recreational area for workers. North of the carport was a squash court with a garage for maintenance vehicles under it. When the Research Tower was built, a separate set of offices was constructed on the site of the squash court and carport's roof. These offices have a forced-air system and hot water ceiling panels for cooling and heating, respectively.

==== Furniture ====
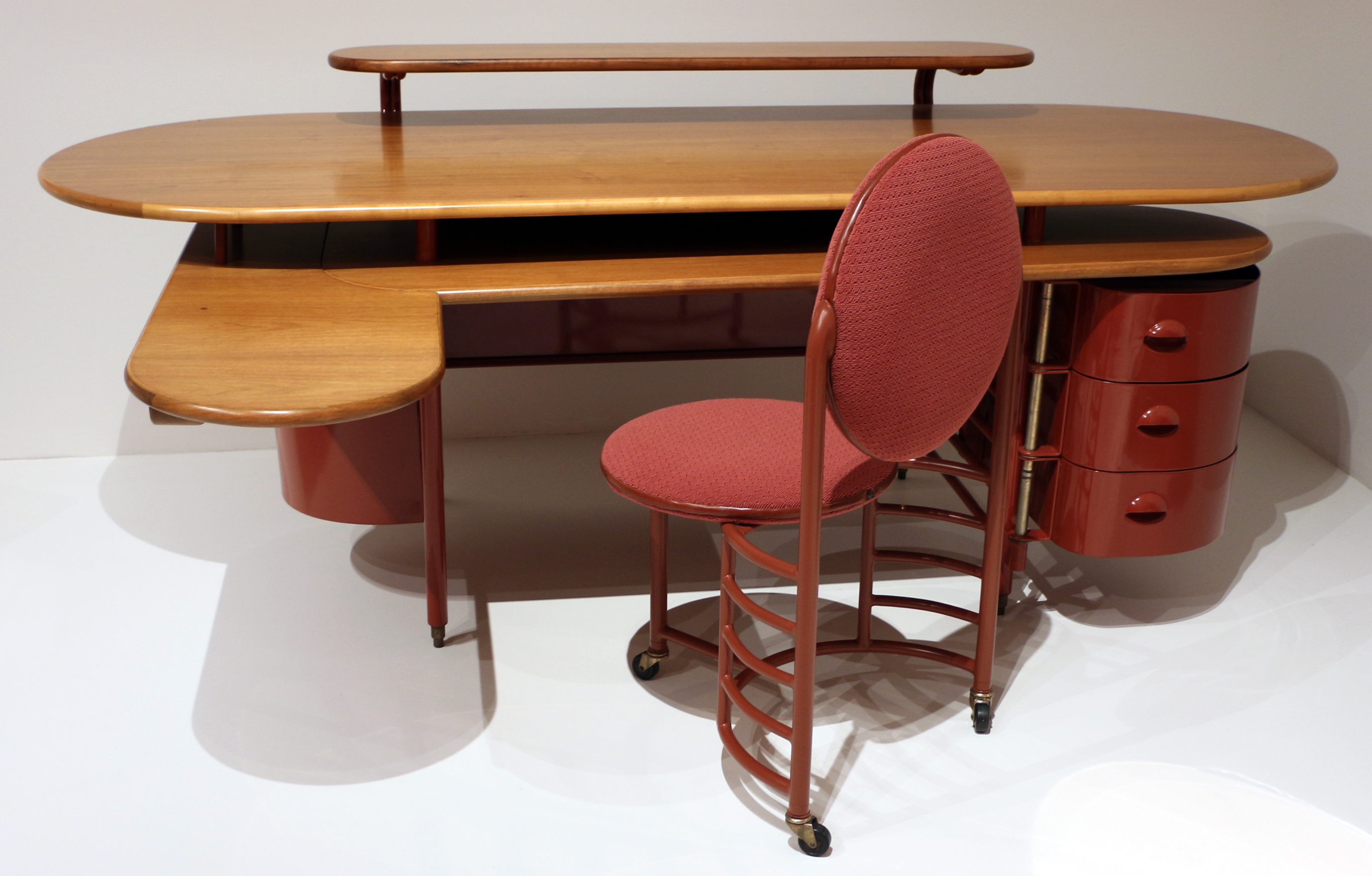
A typical desk and three-legged chair

Wright designed the building's furniture, which was produced by Steelcase. Made of magnesite and cast aluminum, it was the first metal office furniture Wright designed in over three decades. Around 40 types of furniture were created for the building, many of which incorporate curved shapes such as ovals. These shapes recalled the shapes of the workroom's petals. Wright created three-legged aluminum chairs, which were color-coded by department (Note: The sales department used beige chairs, the record department used blue chairs, the billing department used green chairs, and the credit department used red chairs.) and would tip over if its occupants did not have both feet on the ground. After several employees (and Wright himself) fell out of the chairs, the architect designed the "officer's chair", a four-legged variant of the chair. A fourth leg was later added to most of the three-legged chairs. The chairs were upholstered in textured fabric, with backs and feet that could be reversed as necessary. For officers and secretaries, Wright designed another type of four-legged chair, which, rather than trying to enforce good postures, was intended for comfort.

There were also nine types of desks; the typical desk measured 84 by 32 inches (2,130 by 810 mm), although round and rectangular tables of different dimensions were created for some departments, such as the mailroom. The layout of the desks, particularly the top portions, were intended to evoke the building's exterior layout. The desks generally had oval wooden desktops, with cutouts for devices such as comptometers and typewriters. These desktops were cantilevered toward the user. There are built-in drawers under each desk could swing outward, as well as wastebaskets hung above the floor. The information desk, custom-made for the site, wraps around one of the lobby's columns. Replicas of the desks have been sold to the public.

== Research Tower ==
Wright also designed the 15-story Research Tower. Sources disagree on the building's exact height; the Council on Tall Buildings and Urban Habitat and a contemporary Journal Times article cite the tower as measuring 156 feet (48 m) tall, which would have made it the tallest building in Racine when it was built. S. C. Johnson's website, ArchDaily, and a Journal Times article from 1982 all describe the building as 153 feet (47 m) tall; this would make it Racine's second-tallest extant building behind the Racine County Courthouse. Above ground level are seven square-shaped full stories, alternating with seven circular mezzanines; (Note: Other sources give a different figure of six mezzanines.) the second floor, which is square, has no mezzanine.

Wright referred to the Research Tower as a "helio-lab" because of the way it was illuminated by the sun. A garden and three fountain pools surround its base, while a court on three sides provides parking for employees.

=== Exterior ===
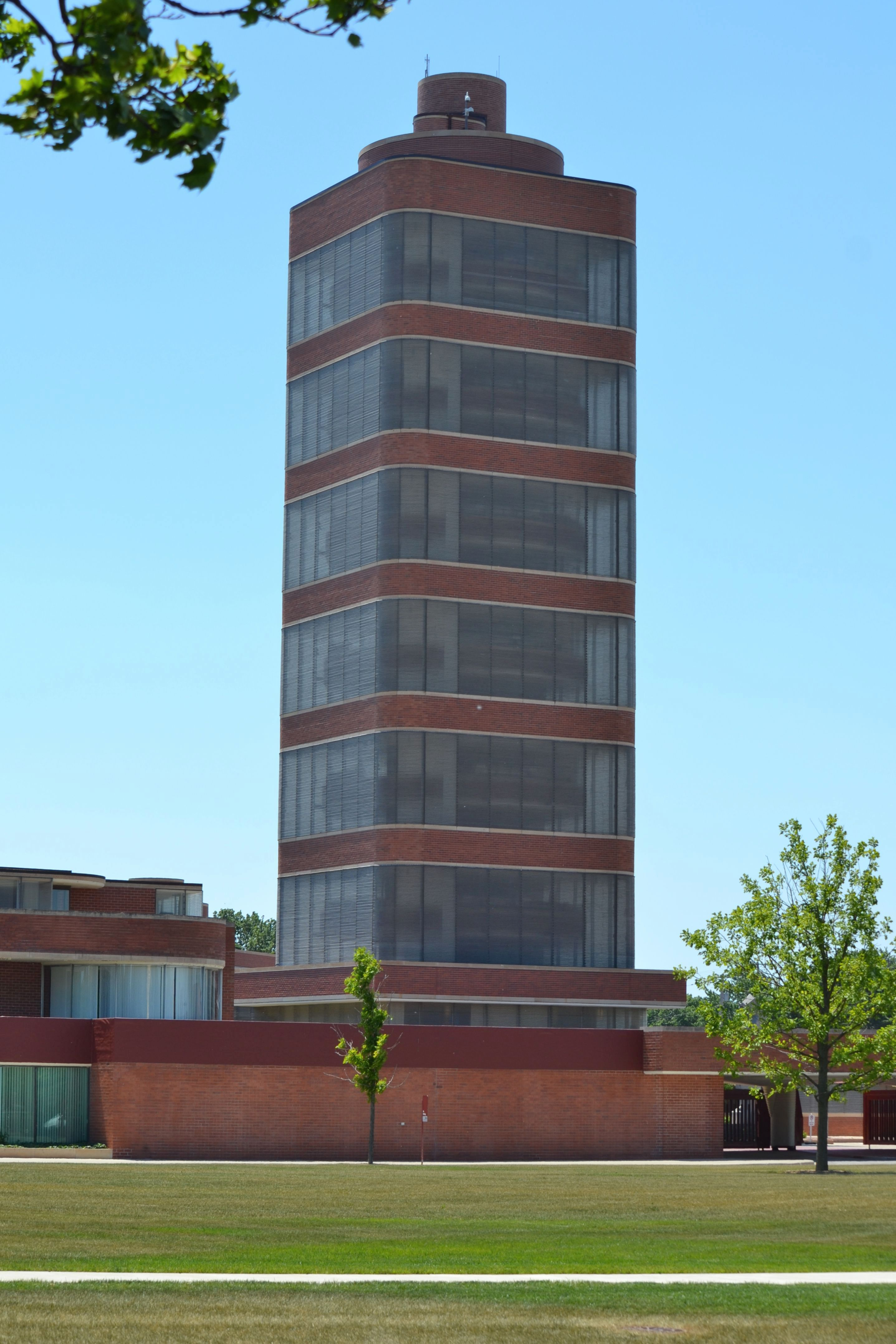
The Research Tower seen in 2012

The facade has full-height windows between brick spandrel panels. Since there are spandrels only at the full stories, the facade appears to have only eight levels. The bricks are tinted Cherokee red and are the same as those used on the Administration Building. The windows are composed of glass tubes measuring 2 inches (51 mm) in diameter and separated by insulating strips made of synthetic rubber. There are 17 miles (27 km) of glass tubes, which are bound to aluminum racks; these racks contain semicircular incisions for the glass tubes. The Research Tower contains 21 miles (34 km) of insulating strips. There are also plate-glass panels behind the glass-tube walls. To prevent water from leaking into the building, there are gaskets and tiny pieces of plastic between the Pyrex tubes.

Several smaller structures are connected to the Research Tower. These include a three-story annex for S. C. Johnson's advertising department, technical department, and lounge. There is also a pilot plant with one basement level and one above-ground story. These structures completely surround the Research Tower, creating a courtyard around the structure. As such, the Research Tower's ground story is not visible from the street, giving it the impression that it is floating. There is a two-story annex on Franklin Street, which dates from the early 1960s and is clad with red brick, molded Plexiglas, reinforced concrete, and Kasota limestone.

=== Interior ===
The Research Tower weighs 16 million pounds (7,300,000 kg). Each of the circular mezzanines measures 38 feet (12 m) in diameter, while the squarish main floors measure 40 by 40 feet (12 by 12 m) across. The main floors were originally used as laboratories, while the mezzanines contained offices. There are dumbwaiters within the open spaces between the main floors and the mezzanines, and staff could call out to each other through the openings. Each story is cantilevered from a cylindrical core, a principle that Wright would later use for his design of the Price Tower in Bartlesville, Oklahoma. As a result, the Research Tower is sometimes likened to a tree and described as having a "taproot core". Like the Administration Building, the Research Tower's interiors do not have corridors in order to maximize the amount of usable office space. The elevator doors are curved, as are doors to the bathrooms.

The core itself measures 13 feet (4.0 m) across and extends 54 feet (16 m) into the ground. The bottom of the core is stabilized by a circular slab measuring 60 feet (18 m) across; it ranges in thickness from 10 to 48 inches (250 to 1,220 mm), with the outermost portions of the slab being thinner. The walls of the core are 7 to 10 inches (180 to 250 mm) thick. There is a staircase and an elevator in the core. Because of the dimensions of the core, the staircase narrows to a minimum width of 24 inches (610 mm) or 29 inches (740 mm). Utilities such as the HVAC system are embedded into the core. There are separate pipes for distilled, cold, and hot water; compressed air; illuminating gas; nitrogen/carbon dioxide; and steam. Alternating current and direct current energy is provided at two voltages. The top of the core contains equipment for the intake and exhaust of cold and hot air.

At each story, utility pipes split from the core, running under the floor slabs to the laboratory desks and the exterior walls. Each floor slab is hollow, with ducts, rebar, and steel sheets sandwiched between the two layers of concrete; they taper in thickness toward their perimeters. The floor slabs reached their maximum thickness near the core, where the ceilings measured as low as 6 feet 5 inches (1.96 m). Fume hoods for laboratory equipment were installed near the core, and there were ratchets to raise or lower the work surfaces under the hoods. The spaces had no sprinklers, so combustible items were banned from the tower. On each pair of floors, there are air-intake openings on the main floors and air-exhaust vents on the ceilings of the mezzanines. Each story also had an air-intake grille and radiators. The floors themselves originally housed several departments, in addition to a research library, and had built-in furniture. About six researchers could work on each floor.

When part of the courtyard was enclosed in a 1957 expansion, the ground-level laboratories were expanded by 8,800 square feet (820 m^{2}), while the basement laboratories were expanded by 2,575 square feet (239.2 m^{2}). The annex on Franklin Street measures 140 by 45 feet (43 by 14 m) across, with 11,750 square feet (1,092 m^{2}) of space. The Franklin Street annex contains 38 staff offices, two general offices, and a 20-foot-wide (6.1 m) circular room used for meetings.

== Impact ==
=== Reception ===
==== Contemporary ====
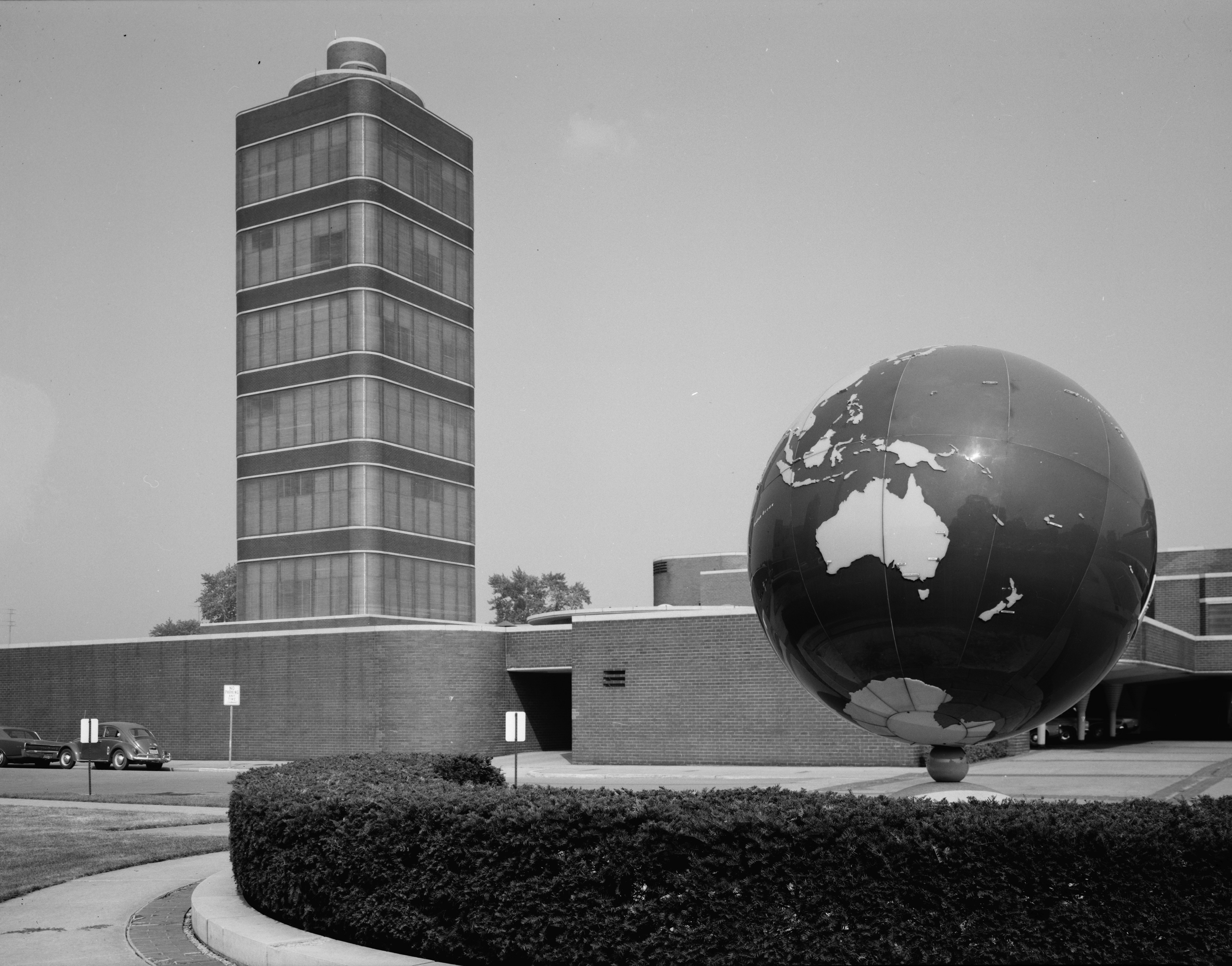
1969 photo of headquarters building with tower

When the Administration Building was under construction, The Christian Science Monitor described it as a "complete about-face from the skyscraper", citing its streamlined, low-to-the-ground design. The design also led The Journal Times to characterize the structure as an entirely new type of office building. The editor of the Architectural Review, in a conversation with Ben Wiltscheck, regarded the Administration Building as "a progressive landmark in office building architecture". One publication described the tapering concrete columns in the building as having a "fairy-like slenderness", while Time magazine said the Johnson Administration Building "is unlike any other in the world" and was among Wright's best work.

After the Administration Building was finished, a writer for The Hartford Courant wrote that Wright has "made us little men feel big", and The Capital Times said that Wright "has again pioneered with the Johnson building". United Press International wrote that the building's design was meant to erase differences between management and subordinates, saying that "the errand boy and the president sit on the same kind of a chair". The Spokesman-Review of Spokane, Washington, wrote that architects had called the structure "the greatest contribution to business housing since the design of the skyscraper", and Life magazine compared the Administration Building's futuristic design to the architecture of the 1939 New York World's Fair. The editor of the Milwaukee Journal likened the "cool, gliding, musical" interior to "a woman swimming naked in a stream". Ward Morehouse, visiting the building in 1946, felt that "it should be put on wheels and shown to the nation".

When the Research Tower was under construction, the New York Herald Tribune described it as a "glass Hollyhock", a reference to Wright's Hollyhock House in Los Angeles. The architect Philip Johnson, who directed MoMA's architecture department, regarded the Research Tower as one of three buildings that "will make 1950 rival any year in American architecture", along with the headquarters of the United Nations and 860–880 Lake Shore Drive. When the tower was finished, one commentator wrote that it was "as soul-stirring as the Colosseum, the Alps, or Sorrento", while The Berkshire Eagle of Pittsfield, Massachusetts, likened the core to a flagpole. Cosmopolitan magazine wrote that Wright had "create[d] a kind of beauty the past had never seen", listing the Johnson Wax Headquarters as one of seven "art wonders of America", while another observer likened the Administration Building to a cathedral. Architectural Forum wrote in 1951 that the Research Tower's flower-like superstructure was an "instance of an architect's creation in a field hitherto not invaded by ... the great Art of Architecture".

==== Retrospective ====
American architects deemed the Johnson Wax Headquarters one of "seven wonders of American architecture" in a 1958 survey. The Administration Building and Research Tower received the Twenty-five Year Award from the American Institute of Architects (AIA) in 1974, in honor of the buildings' "design of enduring significance". The AIA also described the structures as two of seventeen "examples of [Wright's] contribution to American culture". Additionally, in a survey of 170 AIA fellows in 1986, the building ranked ninth on a list of "most successful examples of architectural design". A writer for the Journal Times said in 1993 that the Johnson Wax Headquarters and Wingspread "overshadow the rest of the architecture in Racine County" because they were so well-known.

When Hibbert died in 1978, the Herbert F. Johnson Museum of Art's director said that Hibbert's decision to hire Wright "was a daring and courageous action at the time". Michael Kimmelman of The Chicago Tribune wrote in 1986 that the Johnson Wax Headquarters "is without question one of the most remarkable commercial structures ever built". The British historian Kenneth Frampton described the structures as "possibly the most profound work of art that America has ever produced". A local newspaper reporter, touring the headquarters in the 1990s, wrote that "you'll never look at any building the same way again", describing the structures as not merely utilitarian. Dale Buss wrote in The Wall Street Journal in 2009 that the headquarters' design had inspired "a form of architectural husbandry" by S. C. Johnson, although he thought the Golden Rondelle Theater's design clashed with the rest of the complex.

Several critics have compared the Administration Building to a church, including Paul Goldberger of The New York Times and Paul Richard of The Washington Post. Wright's biographer Robert Twombly regarded the Administration Building as reflecting an outdated belief that subordinates should be observed by their supervisors. In a 2000 book about American architecture, the writer Carter Wiseman compared the interior of the great workroom to "a dense but sheltering forest" because of the presence of the columns. The Architectural Review, in 2009, described the Administration Building's design as having "a socialist bent", since the great workroom functioned as a shared workspace. As for the Research Tower, the journalist Brendan Gill described it as being more esthetically pleasing than practical.

After the Research Tower opened for tours in 2014, a writer for Architectural Record wrote that the tower was cramped and that its props were out of place, but that the Administration Building as "remarkably light and airy". James S. Russell of The Wall Street Journal wrote that the structures had retained their character over time, both because of S. C. Johnson's stewardship and because of their innovative nature. Blair Kamin wrote that both buildings "richly express the optimism of their time", and a writer for Curbed saw both buildings as "a dashing vision of the modern American workplace". A writer for Chicago Reader said in 2017 that the buildings contrasted with Wright's residential designs, which harmonized with their surroundings rather than turning inward as the Johnson Wax buildings did.

=== Media ===
Although comparatively few publications reported on the Administration Building's construction, the building itself received large amounts of publicity after construction began. Time, Life, and Architectural Forum magazines all covered the building while it was under construction, and news agencies published stories about the building's opening in newspapers across the U.S. When the Research Tower was finished, it too was widely publicized. Articles and images of the buildings were published around the world, and the architectural and mechanical aspects of both buildings were detailed in trade journals. S. C. Johnson credited the buildings' design with creating publicity for the company, whose executives gave Wright a plaque and a $20,000 check as a sign of gratitude in 1953. In addition, the company used depictions of the buildings in its trademarks until 1959. The Capital Times estimated in 1962 that revenue from publicity had exceeded the headquarters' construction cost.

The printmaker Frances Myers created a folio with images of the Johnson Wax Headquarters in 1980, and Herbert F. Johnson Museum of Art curator Jonathan Lipman published a book about the buildings in 1986. In addition, the headquarters buildings were described in a 30-minute video project called "The Wright Way", filmed in 1994.

=== Landmark designations ===
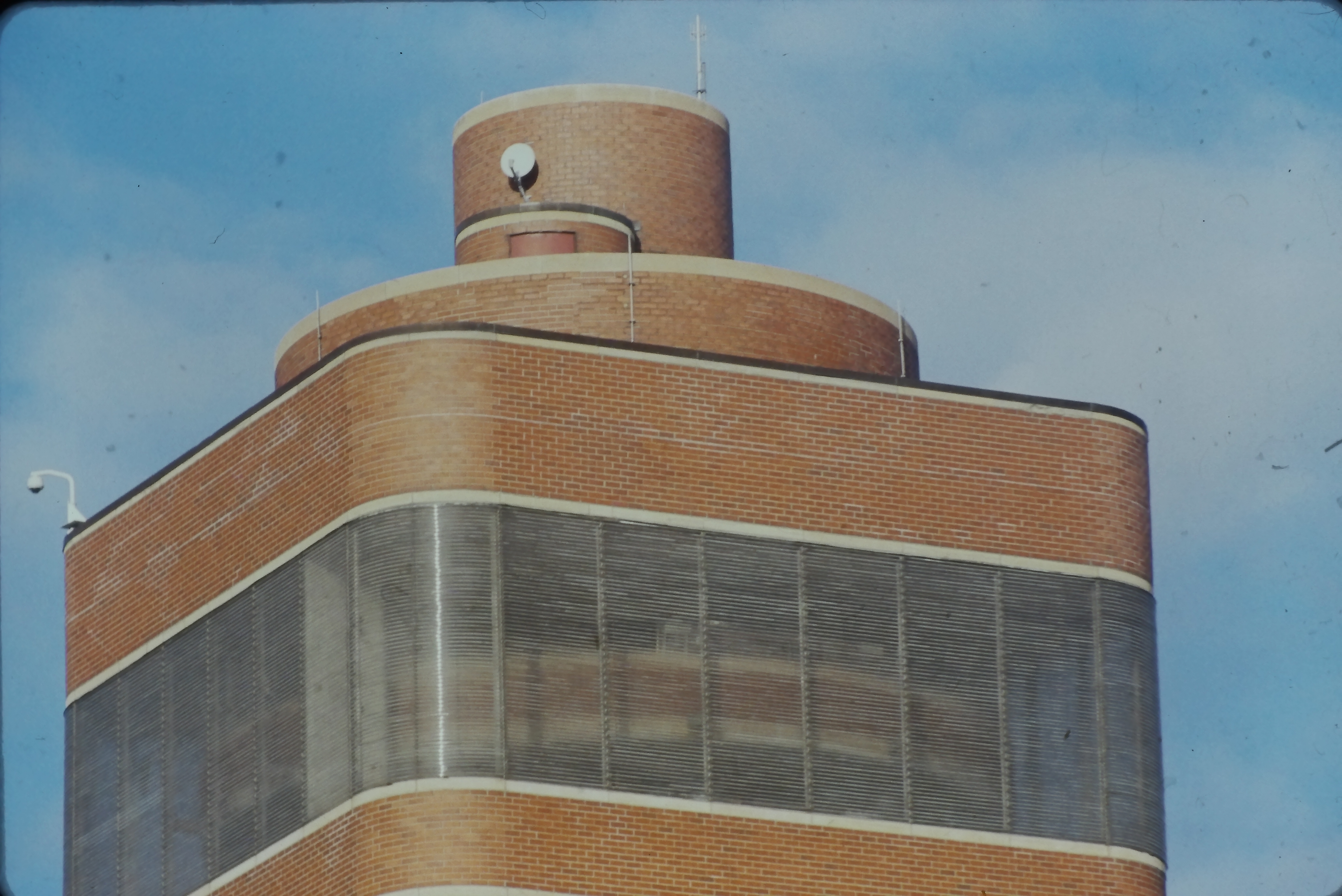
The Research Tower's top stories

The buildings were added to the National Register of Historic Places (NRHP) in 1974; although most NRHP listings were required to be at least 50 years old, this rule was waived for both structures. Both buildings were designated as National Historic Landmarks in March 1976, comprising the first National Historic Landmark designation in Racine, as well as Wisconsin's 15th such designation overall. After Racine's city council passed a law in 1974 permitting city-landmark designations, the Administration Building and Research Center were among the first buildings in Racine to be nominated for such a designation; the structures became Racine city landmarks in August 1975. The Johnson Wax Headquarters was and ten other Wright buildings were nominated as a World Heritage Site in 2011, but the Johnson buildings were removed from the nomination at S. C. Johnson's request. (Note: Eight of the other ten buildings were designated as a World Heritage Site in 2019 under the name "The 20th-Century Architecture of Frank Lloyd Wright".)

=== Exhibits and architectural influence ===
After the Administration Building was completed, a model of the building was displayed at New York's Museum of Modern Art (MoMA) in 1940. Both the tower and original building were featured in a traveling exhibit of Wright's work in 1951. MoMA also hosted an exhibit about the buildings in 1952, and it displayed photographs of the buildings in another exhibit the next year. The Herbert F. Johnson Museum of Art sponsored a traveling exhibit about the buildings beginning in 1986. The Milwaukee Art Museum displayed schematics and models of the buildings in 1990, and MoMA also displayed cutaways of the offices in a 1994 exhibit. In addition, the headquarters was detailed in an exhibit by the Racine Heritage Museum in 2002.

The designs of the Johnson Wax buildings also influenced Wright and his personal style. According to the historian Vincent Scully, the Administration Building was one of Wright's earliest buildings to incorporate curves, and Wright himself said in 1951 that he had been inspired to "abolish the box" when he designed the Administration Building. As for the Research Tower, Wright regarded it as a prototype of his high-rise designs. The historian Franklin Toker wrote that the Administration Building had been a particularly important commission for Wright, who did not want to be known primarily as a designer of houses. Ultimately, the Johnson Wax Headquarters and the Larkin Building were the only major commercial buildings Wright ever designed. The Johnson buildings helped revive his career, which had stalled in the 1930s.

The Administration Building's workroom has been cited as an early example of an open-plan office. Fay Jones, one of Wright's apprentices, cited the Johnson Administration Building as an inspiration for his own Mildred B. Cooper Memorial Chapel in Arkansas. Other buildings have also used design elements inspired by those in the Johnson Wax buildings; for example, Santiago Calatrava's Milwaukee Art Museum building contains tapering columns like those at the Administration Building.

== See also ==
- List of Frank Lloyd Wright works
- List of National Historic Landmarks in Wisconsin
- National Register of Historic Places in Racine County, Wisconsin
