= We Are Young (disambiguation) =

"We Are Young" is a 2011 song by Fun featuring Janelle Monáe.

We Are Young may also refer to:

- We Are Young (film), a 1967 Canadian multi-screen documentary short film
- We Are Young (TV series), a 2020 Chinese reality competition show
- "Kick Ass (We Are Young)", a 2010 song by Mika and RedOne
- "Young" (Tulisa song), originally "We Are Young", a 2012 song by Tulisa
- We Are Young, a 2015 album, or the 2012 title song, by Vassy
- "We Are Young", a song by 3OH!3 from Streets of Gold, 2010
- "We Are Young", a song by Psy from 4X2=8, 2017

== See also ==
- "We Are the Young", a 1984 song by Dan Hartman
- We Are the Young, a 2015 album by Kingsland Road
- We Were Young (disambiguation)
