= City Out of Wilderness =

1974 film

- Directed by: Francis Thompson
- Produced by: Francis Thompson
- Production companies: Francis Thompson, Inc. for the United States Capitol Historical Society
- Distributed by: Films Inc.
- Release date: 1974
- Running time: 28 minutes
- Country: United States
- Language: English

City Out of Wilderness is a 1974 American short documentary film produced by Francis Thompson. It was nominated for an Academy Award for Best Documentary Short Subject. Produced by the United States Capitol Historical Society, City Out of Wilderness chronicles the history and evolution of Washington, D.C., from its very beginnings to the then-modern era of the 1970s.

== See also ==
- List of American films of 1974
