= N.Y., N.Y. (film) =

1957 film by Francis Thompson

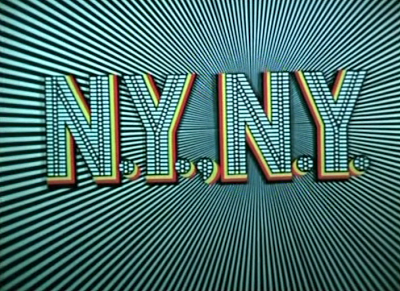
- Directed by: Francis Thompson
- Music by: Gene Forrell
- Distributed by: Anagram International
- Release date: 1957
- Running time: 15 minutes
- Country: United States
- Language: English

N.Y., N.Y. (subtitled A Day in New York) is a 1957 film by director Francis Thompson.

== Summary ==
Eight years in the making, it is a collection of scenes from New York City recorded through special lenses, prisms and mirrors giving it a Cubist-Dadaist look. Thompson shot the images with a Kodak Cine-Special. The film's original negatives sat under the director's bed for nearly thirty years.

== Reception and legacy ==
N.Y., N.Y. is mentioned in Aldous Huxley's essay Heaven and Hell:

And then there is what may be called the Distorted Documentary a new form of visionary art, admirably exemplified by Mr. Francis Thompson's film, NY, NY. In this very strange and beautiful picture we see the city of New York as it appears when photographed through multiplying prisms, or reflected in the backs of spoons, polished hub caps, spherical and parabolic mirrors. We still recognize houses, people, shop fronts, taxicabs, but recognize them as elements in one of those living geometries which are so characteristic of the visionary experience. The invention of this new cinematographic art seems to presage (thank heaven!) the supersession and early demise of non-representational painting. It used to be said by the non-representationalists that colored photography had reduced the old-fashioned portrait and the old-fashioned landscape to the rank of otiose absurdities. This, of course, is completely untrue. Colored photography merely records and preserves, in an easily reproducible form, the raw materials with which portraitists and landscape painters work. Used as Mr. Thompson has used it, colored cinematography does much more than merely record and preserve the raw materials of non-representational art; it actually turns out the finished product. Looking at NY, NY, I was amazed to see that virtually every pictorial device invented by the old masters of non-representational art and reproduced ad nauseam by the academicians and mannerists of the school, for the last forty years or more, makes its appearance, alive, glowing, intensely significant, in the sequences of Mr. Thompson's film.

It also received praise from The New York Times as 'one of the few genuine masterpieces' of the burgeoning experimental film movement in the United States.

Two years later, it won the Short Film Palme d'Or (Prix Ex-aequo) at the Cannes Film Festival. In 1961, it won a Blue Ribbon at the American Film Festival.

== See also ==
- Modernist film
- List of American independent films
