= J. Gordon Lippincott =

American engineer and design consultant

J. Gordon Lippincott (1908-1998) was an American industrial designer and co-founder of the design firm Lippincott & Margulies.

== Early life and education ==
Lippincott was born in 1908. He graduated from Swarthmore College with an engineering degree in 1931 and later earned a master's degree in architecture and civil engineering from Columbia University.

== Career ==
Lippincott joined Pratt Institute's faculty in 1936, collaborating with Donald Dohner to help establish its design education program. While teaching, Lippincott began consulting as an industrial designer and authored Economics of Design in 1937.

In 1943, Lippincott and Dohner opened a design office in New York, initially partnering with the Douglas T. Sterling Company in Stamford, CT, and named the firm Dohner & Lippincott. After Dohner's death, Lippincott took over the editing of the industrial design section of Interiors magazine. The firm was renamed J. Gordon Lippincott and Company in 1944. Walter Margulies joined the firm in 1944, and it was subsequently renamed as Lippincott & Margulies. The firm's notable projects include the 1946 redesign of Campbell's soup packaging, introducing the iconic red-and-white can.

Lippincott published another book, Design for Business, in 1947 through Paul Theobold. He retired in 1969.
