= We Were Young =

We Were Young may refer to:

- We Were Young (film), a 1961 Bulgarian film originally released as A byahme mladi
- We Were Young (album), a 2009 album by Jonathan Jones
- "We Were Young" (song), a 2019 song by Petit Biscuit
- "We Were Young", a song by Charlotte Church from Back to Scratch

== See also ==
- We Are Young (disambiguation)
