= To Be Alive! =

1964 film

- Directed by: Alexander Hammid; Francis Thompson
- Written by: Alexander Hammid; Francis Thompson; Edward Field (narration)
- Starring: Robert Fields
- Cinematography: Alexander Hammid; Francis Thompson
- Production company: Francis Thompson Productions
- Distributed by: S. C. Johnson & Son
- Release date: 1964
- Running time: 18 minutes
- Country: United States
- Language: English

To Be Alive! is a 1964 American short documentary film co-directed by Francis Thompson and Alexander Hammid. The film is notable for its use of a multi-screen format and for winning the Oscar for Documentary Short Subject at the 38th Academy Awards.

== Concept and presentation ==
To Be Alive! was produced by S.C. Johnson & Son for presentation at the Johnson Wax pavilion at the 1964 New York World's Fair. The film was designed to celebrate the common ground between different cultures by tracing how children in various parts of the world mature into adulthood. The film was shot over an 18-month period in various locations across the United States, Europe, Asia and Africa.

In screening To Be Alive!, it was decided to use an experimental method consisting of three separate 18-foot screens. Unlike the Cinerama process that joined three screens into a single unbroken entity, the three screens for To Be Alive! were separated by one foot of space.

In 1966, a book based on the film was released by S.C. Johnson. This text included an endorsement by Ralph J. Bunche, the Nobel Prize-winning United Nations undersecretary.

== Awards ==
To Be Alive! made history in late 1964 when it received a special award from the New York Film Critics Circle, which marked the first time that a non-theatrical commercial production was cited for an accolade. (The film was considered non-theatrical because it was included as part of the admission to the Johnson Wax pavilion.)

However, the Academy of Motion Pictures Arts and Sciences ruled that To Be Alive! was ineligible for Oscar consideration because of its presentation on three separate screens. To rectify this, the film's producers created a 70mm single-screen version that was shown in 1965 in Los Angeles, qualifying it for the Oscar. It won the Academy Award, beating out another sponsored short documentary, Point of View, produced by the National Tuberculosis Association.

The film was also honored with an award by the National Conference of Christians and Jews.

== Screenings ==
After a screening at the United Nations Pavilion at Expo 1967 in Montreal, Quebec, Canada, To Be Alive! was available for public screening only at the Golden Rondelle Theater at the Johnson Wax Headquarters in Racine, Wisconsin.
