= Francis Thompson (film director) =

American film director, producer, and writer

- Born: January 3, 1908
- Died: December 26, 2003 (aged 95)
- Occupation: Film director

E. Francis Thompson (January 3, 1908 – December 26, 2003) was an American director, producer, and writer known for his multi-screen and giant-screen filmography.

== Early life ==
Thompson was born Ebenezer Francis Thompson on January 3, 1908, in Titusville, Pennsylvania, and commenced his career as a painter and art teacher before he directed his first film Evolution of a Skyscraper.

== Film career ==
He is best known for the films, N.Y., N.Y. (1957), To Be Alive! (1964), and City Out of Wilderness (1974) and is credited with making the first IMAX film, To Fly (1976).

Thompson's style can most accurately be described as ciné-poème. In many of his films, Thompson employs a variety of kaleidoscopic lenses, distorting devices, and secretive techniques, turning his work into more of an abstract art installation than feature film.

He won the 1965 Academy Award for Best Documentary (Short Subject) for To Be Alive! (1964), which he co-directed with Alexander Hammid. He was a member of the Directors Guild of America and the Academy of Motion Picture Arts and Sciences. After a 50-year career in filmmaking, he retired in 1987.

== Filmography ==
- Women of Tomorrow (1950)
- Fears of Children (1951)
- N.Y., N.Y. (1957)
- To Be Alive! (1964)
- We Are Young (1967), co-director
- City Out of Wilderness (1974)
- To Fly (1976)
- On the Wing (1986)

== Death ==
Thompson died on December 26, 2003, in New York at the age of 95.
