= We Are Young (film) =

- Directed by: Alexander Hammid; Francis Thompson
- Release date: 21 April 1967
- Running time: 20 minutes
- Country: Canada
- Budget: over $1 million

We Are Young is a 1967 Canadian multi-screen documentary short film which was first presented in Montreal at Expo 67.

The film was screened in a 12-sided theatre inside the Canadian Pacific Railway–Cominco Pavilion with capacity for 545 people. We Are Young was presented again in 1968 at the same site for the continuing exhibition, Man and His World.

== Premise ==
The film concerned youth, featuring young persons in various scenes such as action scenes on horseback and on motorcycles.

== Production ==
The production budget was over one million dollars. It was filmed with three Arriflex cameras. The film was presented on six screens, three wide by two tall.
