= Lippincott (brand consultancy) =

American design consulting firm

- Logo since 2024
- Type: Partnership
- Industry: Professional Services
- Founded: 1943; 83 years ago
- Headquarters: New York City, NY, United States
- Key people: Michael D'Esopo, (CEO)
- Parent: Oliver Wyman Group
- Website: lippincott.com

Lippincott (formerly known as Lippincott & Margulies) is a global brand strategy, design, marketing consulting, and experience company. Based in New York City, it is part of the Oliver Wyman Group, a business unit of Marsh & McLennan Companies.

== First years ==
Lippincott was founded in 1943 as Dohner & Lippincott by Raymond Loewy apprentice Donald R. Dohner and industrial designer J. Gordon Lippincott, who taught together at Pratt Institute in Brooklyn. It was initially established as a division of management consulting firm Douglas T. Sterling Company. Despite Dohner's sudden death in December of that year, the name would be kept until 1945, when it was changed to J. Gordon Lippincott & Associates.

In 1947, automobile designer Preston Tucker hired J. Gordon Lippincott & Associates to replace automotive designer Alex Tremulis in the body development of the 1948 Tucker Sedan. The Lippincott team designed a new front end and modified the rear end of the car to match the side panels and roof previously developed by Tremulis.

== Lippincott & Margulies ==
In January 1948, French-born designer and architect Walter P. Margulies joined as principal of the firm, and it would be renamed Lippincott & Margulies. Within the firm's first ten years as L&M, the firm were responsible for the red-and-black "bow tie" for Champion spark plugs, Campbell's's red-and-white can (1952), the Betty Crocker spoon (1954), and the Steelmark (1958).

J. Gordon Lippincott is credited with first coining the term "corporate identity" in the mid-1950s to describe the field which his firm pioneered, which linked name, logo, advertising, and packaging into an integrated and uniform marketing tool. Into the 1960s, L&M maintained close relationships with companies like Johnson Wax, updating existing products and assisting in naming and packaging new ones. The firm designed the Johnson Wax pavilion, as well as the Golden Rondelle Theater, for the 1964 New York World's Fair.

== Growth ==
The firm has operated numerous international offices since the 1960s, its first being a branch serving the United Kingdom that survived until the 1980s. As massive economic growth swept South Korea during the late 1980s and early 1990s, Lippincott & Margulies were among the first Western firms to design corporate identities for now internationally-facing chaebols.

J. Gordon Lippincott left the firm in 1969. Margulies retired as chairman in 1982, but remained as a consultant until his death in 1986. That same year, Lippincott & Margulies would be acquired by Marsh & McLennan, an insurance conglomerate expanding its focus into management consulting. Lippincott & Margulies soon began working with another Marsh & McLennan property, Mercer Management Consulting; both shared some of the same corporate clients. In January 2003, Lippincott & Margulies was merged into Mercer as a division called Lippincott Mercer; this combined name was used until 2007, when the unit became known as simply Lippincott.

== Selected works ==
U.S. Steel (1958)

Dairy Queen (1959)

Sohio (1962)

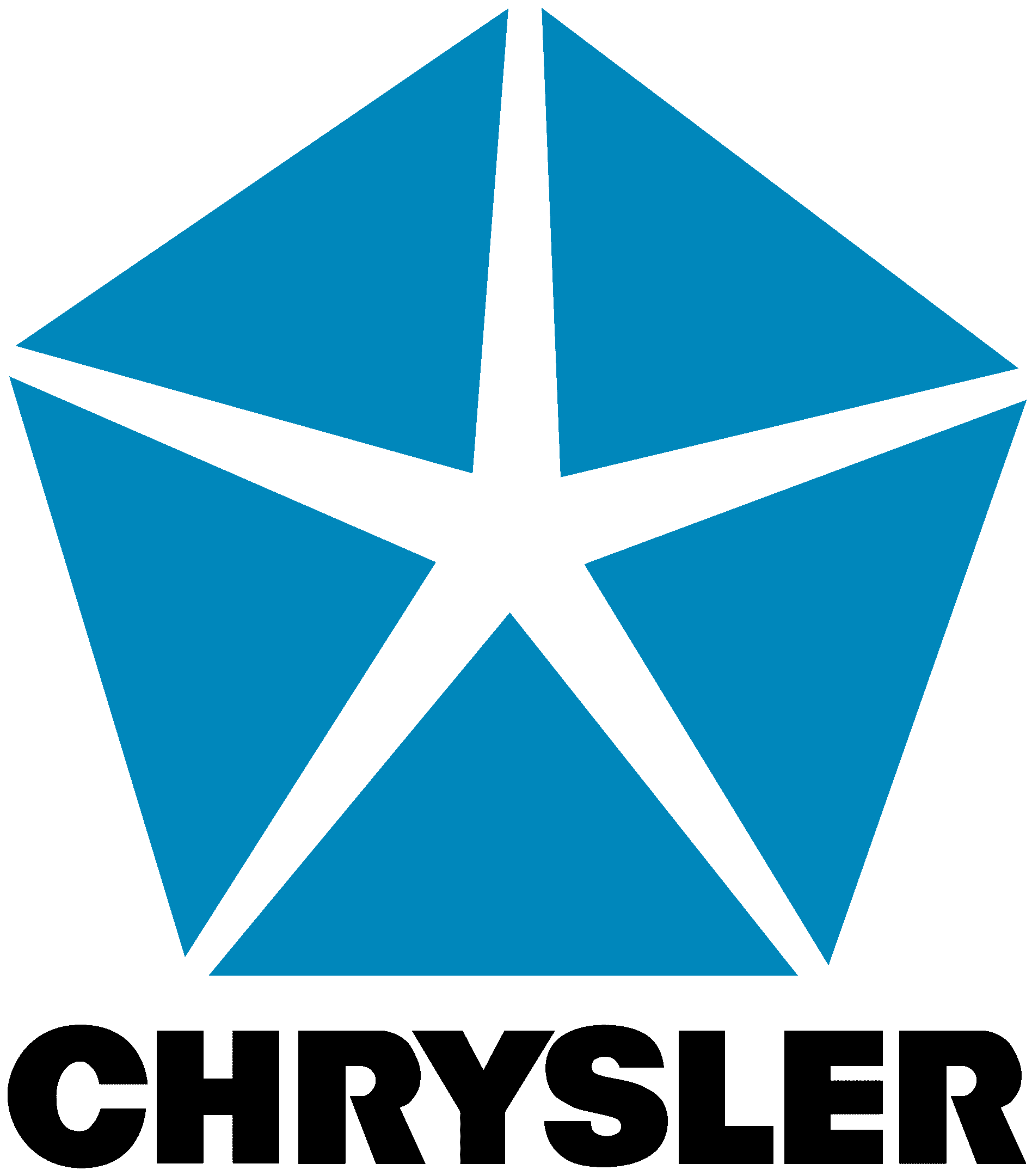
Chrysler (1962)

Group W (1963)

Eastern Air Lines (1964)

Esso (1964)

Citgo (1965)

PPG Industries (1966)

Bendix Corporation (1967)

Canadian Pacific Railway Multimark (1968)

RCA (1968)

The Co-operative Group (1968, 2016)

American Motors (1969)

Burlington Northern Railroad (1970)

Amtrak (1971)

Delchamps (1971)

Paccar (1972)

FMC Corporation (1973)

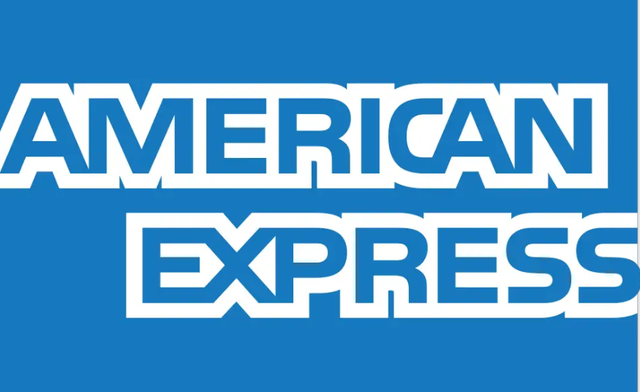
American Express (1974)

Pizza Hut (1974, 2019)

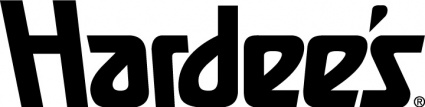
Hardee's (1975)

A&P (1976)

NBC (1976)

Payless ShoeSource (1978)

K&B (1979)

Petro-Canada (1980)

Enron (1986)

Telmex (1992)

Samsung (1993)

Telus Corporation (1996)

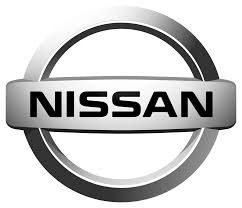
Nissan (2001)

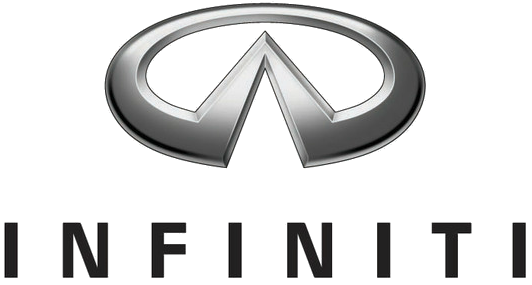
Infiniti (2004)

Chevron Corporation (2005)

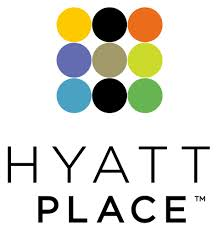
Hyatt Place (2005)

Visa Inc. (2005)

SK Group (2005)

Sprint Corporation (2005)

Delta Air Lines (2007)

Walmart (2008)

EBay (2012)

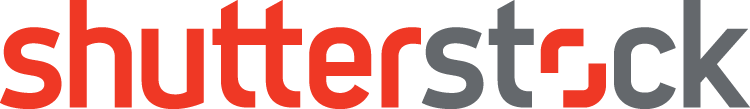
Shutterstock (2012)

Southwest Airlines (2014)

Pepsi (2014)

Rogers Communications (2015)

Southern Company (2016)

Bushiroad (2017)

General Mills (2017)

S. C. Johnson & Son (2018)

DuPont (2018)

PBS (2019)

Cygames (2021)

CIBC (2021)

Standard Chartered (2021)

PBS Kids (2022)

Nokia (2023)

Expedia (2023)

Houghton Mifflin Harcourt (2024)

Bombardier Inc. (2024)

Korean Air (2025)

NTT (2025)

Hanjin (2025)

== See also ==
- Emory Marketing Institute
