= On the Wing (film) =

On the Wing is a 1986 IMAX film featuring a half-sized robotic Quetzalcoatlus that demonstrates principles of animal flight. Produced by the National Air and Space Museum, it also traces the early history of human flight.

The film is narrated by F. Murray Abraham. In one scene filmed in Florida in 1984, a reproduction Benoist airboat was flown, depicting the inaugural flight of the world's first scheduled airline, the St. Petersburg-Tampa Airboat Line, in 1914.
