= List of deans of the Samuel Curtis Johnson Graduate School of Management =

The following people have served as deans or acting deans of the Samuel Curtis Johnson Graduate School of Management at Cornell University.

== Deans ==
- Paul M. O'Leary (1946–1951)
- Edward H. Litchfield (1954–1957)
- C. Stewart Sheppard (1957–1962)
- William D. Carmichael (1962–1970)
- H. Justin Davidson (1970–1981)
- David A. Thomas (1981-1984)
- Curtis W. Tarr (1984–1989)
- Alan G. Merten (1989–1996)
- Robert J. Swieringa (1997–2007)
- L. Joseph Thomas (2007–2012)
- Soumitra Dutta (2012–2016)
- Mark W. Nelson (2016–2023)
- Vishal Gaur (2023-present)

== Acting deans ==
- Melvin G. deChazeau, Acting Dean (1952–1954)
