= John H. Patterson (economist) =

American economist, academic and author

John H. Patterson (1905–1951) of Greensburg, Pennsylvania was an American economist, academic and writer known for his progressive trade position during the debate over the Smoot-Hawley Act. With Paul O'Leary, he authored An Introduction to Money, Banking and Corporations in 1937.

== Early life ==
Patterson came from a railroad family. As an undergraduate at Cornell University, he served on the Student Council's Freshman Advisory Committee, joined the Phi Kappa Psi fraternity, and through that organization was a member of the Irving Literary Society. He took his bachelor's degree in economics in 1925, his master's degree in 1926 and his PhD in 1929. All degrees were conferred by Cornell University. He married a classmate, Ms. Anne Hubbel Seymour.

== Academic career ==
His first teaching position was instructor in economics at Washington Square College, New York University. In 1934, he took leave from NYU and returned as acting assistant professor of economics at Cornell. The next year he served as a lecturer in economics at the University of California at Berkeley. In 1939, he became dean of men at Middlebury College and an associate professor of economics.

== New Dealer ==
Prior to the outbreak of World War Two, he was asked to take a position with the Office of Price Administration in Washington, D.C.
