= H. Justin Davidson =

- Born: November 15, 1930; Gentryville, Indiana
- Died: October 28, 1999 (aged 68); Columbus, Ohio
- Education: Carnegie Mellon (Bachelors, Master)
- Occupations: Academician, administrator, consultant

Harvey Justin Davidson (November 15, 1930 – October 28, 1999) was an engineer, management consultant and American educator, the sixth Dean of the Samuel Curtis Johnson Graduate School of Management at Cornell University and Dean of the Fisher College of Business at Ohio State University. Davidson was only thirty-eight years old when appointed the sixth dean of Johnson Graduate School of Management and served from 1968 to 1979. He was the first non-academic to be appointed to this position. Davidson served as Dean of the Fisher College of Business at Ohio State University from 1979 to 1989. He died of Alzheimer's disease in Columbus, Ohio on October 28, 1999.

He was born to Harvey H. and Dorothy (Eberhardt) Davidson in Gentryville, Indiana; both were educators and his father coached basketball. His great uncle, Aaron Grigsby, was married to Sarah Lincoln, Abraham Lincoln's sister.

Davidson was married to Shirlee Ploeger Davidson (February 18, 1930 – March 25, 2007) of Pittsburgh, Pennsylvania. Both were graduates of Carnegie Mellon University. They had four children, Charles Justin (Susan Ludford) Davidson of Philadelphia, John Clinton Davidson (Daniel Alfaro) of San Francisco, James Christopher Davidson of Cincinnati, OH and Jennifer Davidson (Brian) Jaffe of Traverse City as well as six grandchildren: Jeremy (Sola) Davidson of Philadelphia, Christopher (Katie) Davidson of Philadelphia, Amanda Davidson of Cincinnati, Aaron Jaffe (Hayley Schilling) of New York, Justine Jaffe of New York and Isaac Davidson of Narragansett, RI.
