= Melvin G. deChazeau =

American economist

Melvin G. De Chazeau
- Born: March 20, 1900; Olympia, Washington
- Died: November 28, 1985 (aged 85); Alexandria, Virginia
- Education: University of Washington; Harvard University
- Occupations: Academician, administrator, advisor

Melvin G. de Chazeau (March 20, 1900 – November 28, 1985) was an American economist and the second Dean of Cornell's S.C. Johnson Graduate School of Management following Paul O'Leary's return to teaching. De Chazeau joined the university's College of Arts & Sciences Economics Department in 1948 and he retired from the Cornell Faculty in 1967. As a professor emeritus, de Chazeau taught at Cornell and Dartmouth College through AY 1969–1970.

De Chazeau took his degrees from the University of Washington and Harvard University. He was an authority on the steel and petroleum industries. His wartime service included the War Production Board, President's Council of Economic Advisers, and the National Bureau of Economic Research. Professor de Chazeau left Ithaca, N.Y. in 1983 and moved to Alexandria, Virginia, the place of his death.
