= David A. Thomas (educator) =

American educator

- Born: July 5, 1917; Holliday, Texas
- Died: June 28, 2004 (aged 86); Venice, Florida
- Education: University of Michigan
- Occupations: Academician, administrator, advisor

David Ansell Thomas (July 5, 1917 – June 28, 2004) was an American educator and the seventh Dean of the S.C. Johnson Graduate School of Management at Cornell University, from 1981 to 1984. He received his B.A. from Texas Tech (1937), his M.B.A. and C.P.A. from Texas Christian University, and his Ph.D. from the University of Michigan (1949).

During the Second World War, Dean Thomas served as a captain, U.S. Army Air Corps, seeing combat duty in the Pacific theater. As administrator, Charles E. Merrill Family Trust Fund, he administered $120 million in grants to educational institutions, medical school, religious charities, and social-service organizations.

In 1954, he joined the Cornell School of Business and Public Administration (subsequently named the Graduate School of Management, and eventually the Johnson Graduate School of Management) as an associate professor of accounting. Rising to full professor in a few years, Dr. Thomas became acting dean in 1961 and associate dean in 1962. He continued to teach and publish extensively during the 1960s and 1970s, and finally became dean in 1981.
