= George W. Johnson (academic) =

American academic and academic administrator

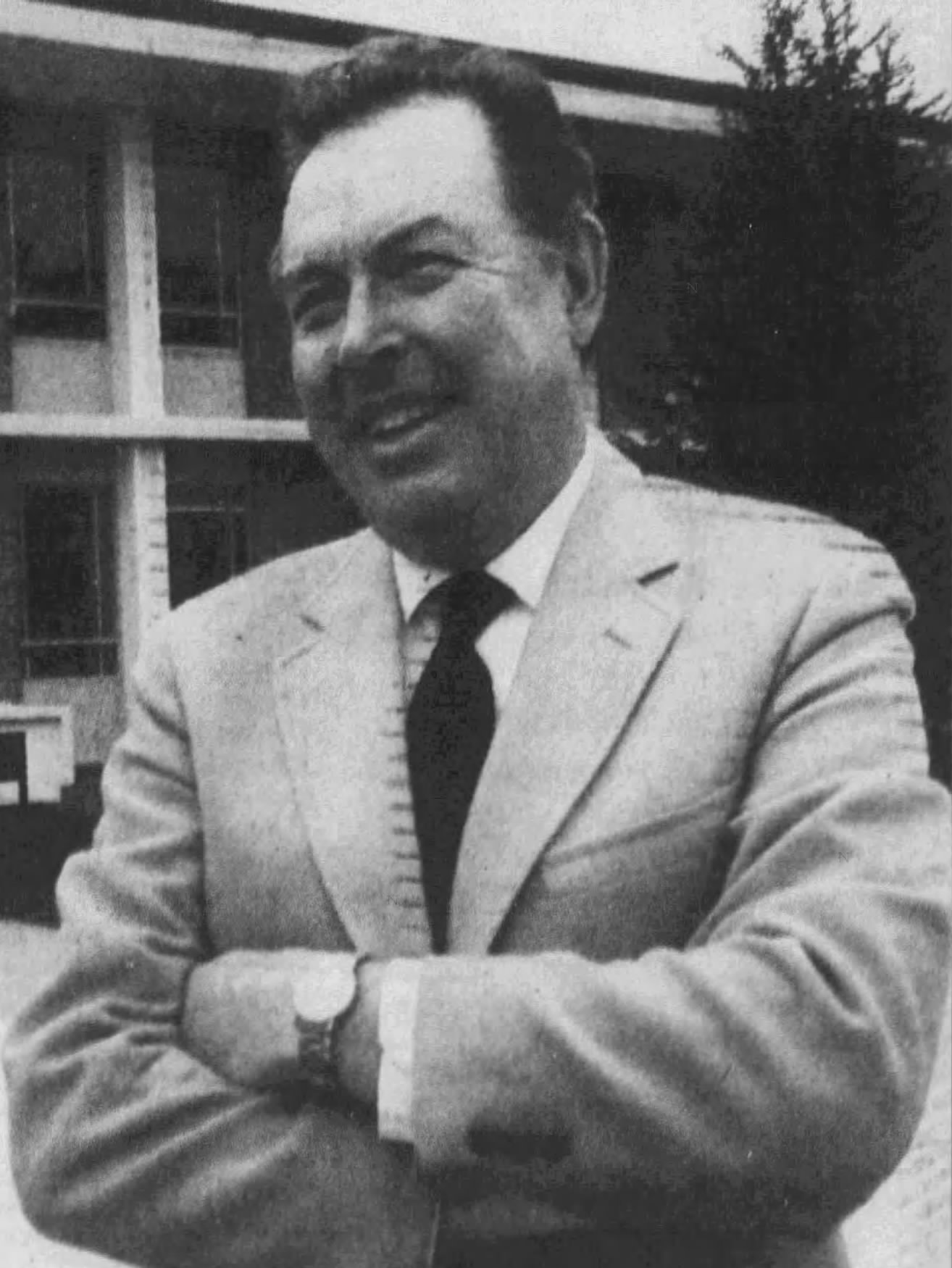
- Johnson in 1986

President of George Mason University
- In office 1978–1996
- Preceded by: Robert C. Krug
- Succeeded by: Alan Merten

Personal details
- Born: George William Johnson Jr. July 5, 1928 Jamestown, North Dakota, U.S.
- Died: May 30, 2017 (aged 88) Falls Church, Virginia, U.S.
- Spouse: Joanne Johnson (1955–2017; his death)
- Children: Two

George William Johnson Jr. (July 5, 1928 – May 30, 2017) was an American academic and academic administrator who served as the President of George Mason University from 1978 to 1996. Johnson is credited with transforming George Mason University from largely a commuter college into a nationally recognized research university during his 18-year tenure as president.

Under Johnson, total student enrollment doubled from 10,000 in 1979 to more than 24,000 students in 1996. Johnson also oversaw the addition of 34 new academic programs (including 11 doctoral programs), the creation of GMU's first doctoral programs, and the establishment of the George Mason University School of Law (now known as the Antonin Scalia Law School) in 1979.

== Early life and education ==
Johnson was born in Jamestown, North Dakota, on July 5, 1928, and raised during the Great Depression. His father worked as a mechanic and part-time fireman. Johnson graduated from Jamestown College (present-day University of Jamestown) on a scholarship before serving in the United States Army during the Korean War. Johnson, a skilled baseball player, played for the U.S. Army exhibition team, but severely injured his shoulder in a collision with an opponent while covering first base. His injury ended his fledgling baseball career, but prevented him from active deployment with his artillery unit during the war.

He enrolled at Columbia University in New York City during the early 1950s under the G.I. Bill. Johnson earned both his master's degree and doctorate in English from Columbia. His doctoral dissertation focused on Stephen Crane. He then taught English at the University of Missouri, where he met his wife, Joanne Ferris. The couple married in June 1955 and had two sons.

== Career ==
=== Temple University ===
Johnson taught English at Temple University in Philadelphia, Pennsylvania, and rose to become chairman of Temple's Department of English. In the late 1970s, while still teaching at Temple, Johnson received a letter inviting him to become President of George Mason University, a school he had never heard of prior the invitation. Johnson accepted and assumed the presidency of George Mason in 1978.

=== George Mason University ===
At the beginning of Johnson's presidency, George Mason University, which opened in 1957, was largely a commuter college with an enrollment of about 10,000 students. Under Johnson, who was president from 1978 to 1996, George Mason University underwent massive growth in student numbers and the construction of new buildings on campus. Johnson once remarked, "We had Harvard aspirations and a community college attitude."

Johnson oversaw the accreditation of the university's first doctoral degrees and the opening of the George Mason University School of Law. Total enrollment doubled from about 10,000 in 1978 to more than 20,000 by 1996. Johnson also conceived and established new satellite campuses in Arlington County, in 1979 and Prince William County. Johnson also undertook a massive campus expansion and construction campaign during his eighteen-year tenure. New facilities completed under Johnson's leadership included the 10,000 seat EagleBank Arena (originally the Patriot Center) in 1985, the Center for the Arts, a new student union, the Johnson Learning Center library, as well as new dormitories and classroom buildings.

As president, Johnson cultivated relationships with corporations and business executives in the surrounding Washington metropolitan area, hoping to emulate the success of Stanford University and transform northern Virginia and GMU into a second Silicon Valley. A meeting between Johnson and executives from AT&T, IBM, and Xerox led him to create five new technology-focused master's program, as well as a doctoral degree in information technology. His relationship with corporate donors led to endowments that brought high-profile talent to George Mason, including civil rights activist Roger Wilkins and the Nobel laureate economist, James Buchanan.

According to Johnson, who reached out to international, national and local businesses for assistance with the university's goals, "We couldn't afford big-time biology, physics, chemistry, so it was going to have to be computer science, information science...I'd like to help this little rudimentary institution but I deal with Stanford and MIT.' Five years later, he became the dean of our business school."

By 1996, the year of his retirement, George Mason University's enrollment had doubled to more than 20,000. The graduating class of 1996 stood at 4,867 graduates, the largest class in the university's history at the time.

== Death ==
Johnson died from complications at Inova Fairfax Hospital in Falls Church, Virginia, on May 30, 2017, at the age of 88, following a fall at his home. His was survived by his wife, Joanne Johnson, whom he married in 1958; their two sons, William Garth Johnson and Robert Craig Johnson; and four grandchildren.
