= Roland Berger =

German entrepreneur, consultant and philanthropist

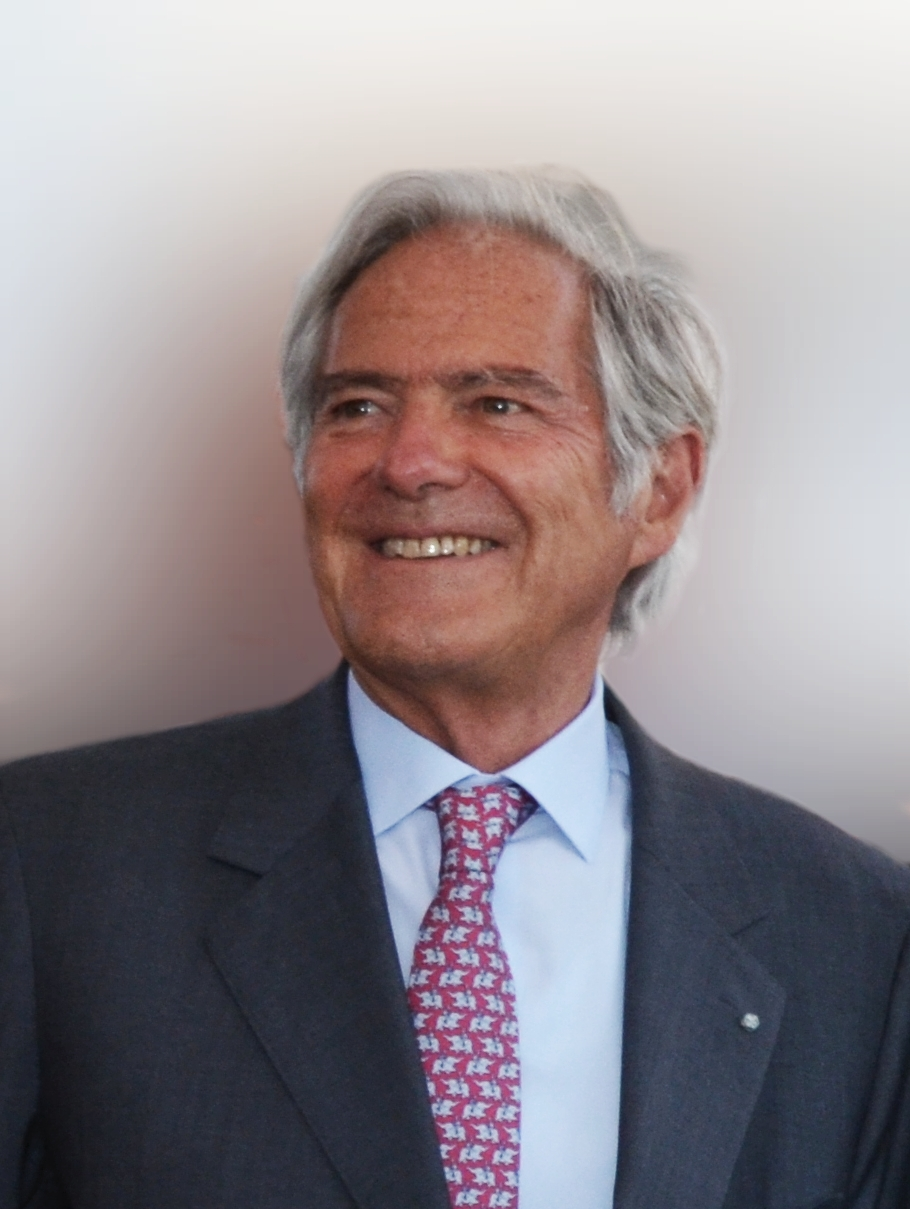
- Born: 22 November 1937 (age 88); Berlin, Germany
- Occupations: Honorary Chairman, Roland Berger Strategy Consultants
- Board member of: Selection: Fresenius SE, INSEAD (Advisory), Miller Buckfire (Advisory)

Roland Berger (born 22 November 1937) is a German entrepreneur, consultant and philanthropist.

== Life ==
Roland Berger was born in Berlin in 1937 as Robert Altmann; his family name changed later, after his father, Georg L. Berger, married his mother in a second marriage. An early member of the Nazi Party (NSDAP), Georg Berger was chief bookkeeper of the Hitler Youth from 1936 to 1939, and in 1940 was appointed general manager of the aryanized Austrian food company Ankerbrot. In 1937 Hitler had appointed Georg Berger Ministerialrat in the Reichswirtschaftsministerium.

Contrary to earlier statements by Roland Berger, Georg Berger was not an active opponent of the persecution of the Jews, nor was he ever sent to a concentration camp. Rather, Berger profited willingly off their persecution. He did, however, lose his influential position within the Nazi Party in an inner-party power struggle in 1942 and was expelled from the party altogether in 1944.

Berger's mother worked as manager in his grandparents' general store, later in a furniture company.

After attending primary school in Vienna and Egglkofen, Roland Berger attended grammar schools in Landshut, Munich and Nuremberg, where he graduated from the humanistic Neuen Gymnasium Nürnberg in 1956. He studied Business Administration in Hamburg and München; besides his studies he ran a laundry with 15 employees. In 1962, he completed his studies as a Diplom-Kaufmann at the Ludwig-Maximilians-Universität München as the best of his year. In 1962 he was able to sell his laundry for 600,000 DM.

From 1962 to 1967 Berger worked as a consultant for the Boston Consulting Group, first in Boston, later in Milan. In 1967, he went into business for himself as a management consultant in Munich and founded the predecessor of today's Roland Berger Strategy Consultants, which he led as CEO until 2003.

A great success for him in 1968 was the recommendation to found the travel company TUI based on his forecast of an extraordinary increase in charter flights from the companies TOUROPA, Scharnow, Hummel and Dr. Tigges. With the opening of a Milan branch in 1969, Berger now focused on internationalizing its consulting activities; the company is now active worldwide. He also increasingly won government institutions as clients.

In 1988, Deutsche Bank acquired 75.1% of the shares in "Roland Berger & Partner GmbH International Management Consulting" for almost 100 million marks. In 1997, the bank increased its stake to 95 percent. One year later, Berger and his staff bought the company back.

== Memberships and functions ==
After stepping down as CEO of Roland Berger Strategy Consultants, Berger became chairman of the supervisory board of the firm in 2003, and has been honorary chairman since 2010.

Since 1996, Roland Berger has held a visiting professorship at the Technical University of Munich and since 2000 an honorary professorship in business administration and management consulting at Brandenburg University of Technology in Cottbus. He was a close advisor of Gerhard Schröder, beginning when Schröder was the Minister-President of Lower Saxony and continuing through his tenure as Chancellor of Germany. Berger reportedly declined an offer to become Minister of Economy in 1998 when Schröder became Chancellor because he wanted to remain independent.

Berger is also the founder of the Roland Berger Foundation for Human Dignity.

Furthermore, Berger is a founding partner and chairman of London-based RiverRock European Capital Partners (formerly BLM Partners) which he established with Florian Lahnstein, Gero Wendenburg and Jason Carley. Thomas Middelhoff left the firm in November 2010. In November 2012 Michel Péretié, former CEO of the Corporate and Investment Banking Division of Société Générale until January 2012, joined RiverRock as partner and CEO.

Berger served as a member of the Advisory Council of INSEAD from 2011 to 2017, and as a member of the supervisory board of the pharmaceuticals and healthcare company Fresenius SE from 2008 to 2016. He is an honorary member and former member of the International Advisory Council of Bocconi University.

In 2015, he was appointed Singapore's honorary consul general in Munich.

== Bibliography ==
- Berger, Roland; Dutta, Soumitra; Raffel, Tobias; Samuels, Geoffrey (2008). Innovating at the Top: How Global CEOs Drive Innovation for Growth and Profit. Palgrave Macmillan. ISBN 978-0-230-57573-8.
