= Sage Hall =

Building in Ithaca, New York

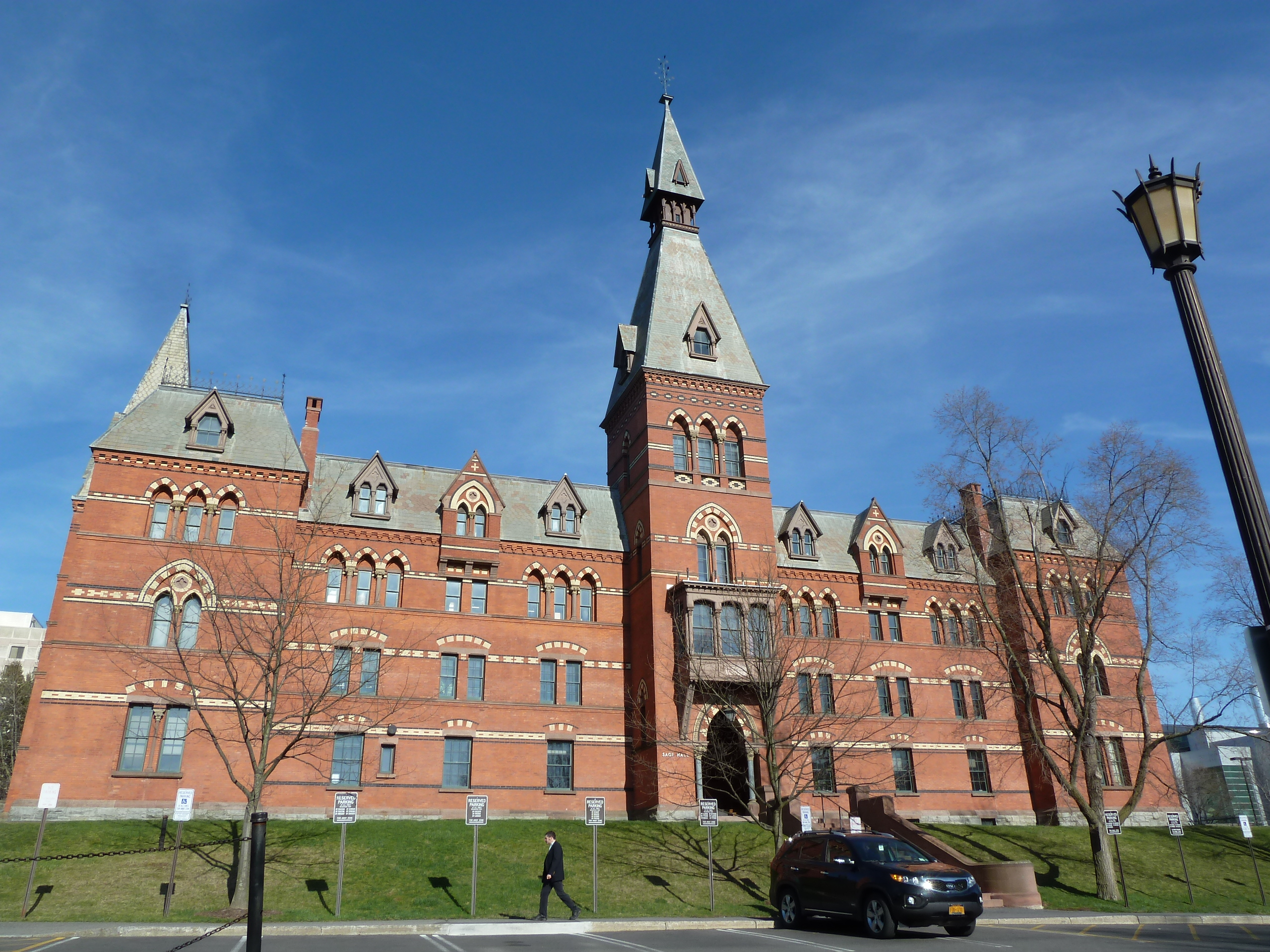
- Sage Hall in 2013

General information
- Location: Ithaca, New York, United States
- Coordinates: 42°26′45″N 76°29′00″W
- Year built: 1875

Sage Hall was built in 1875 at Cornell University's Ithaca, New York campus. Originally designed as a residential building, it currently houses the Johnson Graduate School of Management.

== Conception ==
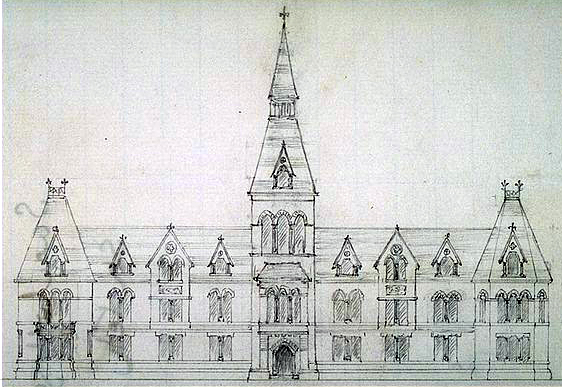
An early conceptual sketch

Although women had previously enrolled in Cornell as early as 1870, the absence of a women's dormitory was problematic in attracting and retaining female students. Sage Hall was built in 1875, financed by Ithaca businessman Henry W. Sage, to fill this need. "When you are ready to carry out the idea of educating young women as thoroughly as young men," Sage told his friend Ezra Cornell in 1868, "I will provide the endowment to enable you to do so." Sage and Andrew Dickson White toured Oberlin College to study facilities being used there to successfully undertake coeducation.

With Sage's $250,000 donation, construction started in 1872 under the guidance of professor of architecture Charles Babcock. In 1875, Sage College welcomed 25 female students, making the university a pioneer in coeducation and attracting many applications. Early graduates included two college presidents, Julia Josephine Thomas Irvine (Wellesley) and Martha Carey Thomas (Bryn Mawr); a prominent women's suffragist, Harriet May Mills; a publisher and author, Ruth Putnam; and the noted Cornell professor and scientist, Anna Botsford Comstock.

Sage Hall was not equally accessible to all female students, however. In 1929, two Black female students, Pauline Davis and Ruth Peyton, were denied residency at Sage by the Dean of Women, R. Louise Fitch. The decision was upheld by Cornell President Livingston Farrand, who wrote in a letter to Ruth Peyton's mother that "... unfortunate as it may be, the placing of a colored student in one of the dormitories inevitably causes more embarrassment than satisfaction for such a student." His predecessor, Jacob Gould Schurman, did involve himself in a similar controversy in 1911, when he had ruled in favor of admitting two Black female students to Sage College after 269 of their white peers had petitioned against it, declaring, “University doors must be open to all students irrespective of race or color or creed ...” By the time the decision was made, however, the two students had already left Cornell.

== Facilities ==
When the building opened, it offered some of the most luxurious accommodations of any college dormitory in the United States. Residents had access to a swimming pool, gym, botanical conservatory, indoor plumbing, and elegant furnishings. The building contained features that defined it as a residential college (as opposed to a traditional dormitory) such as a dining hall, classrooms, a library, and professorial offices. It could house up to 120 students.

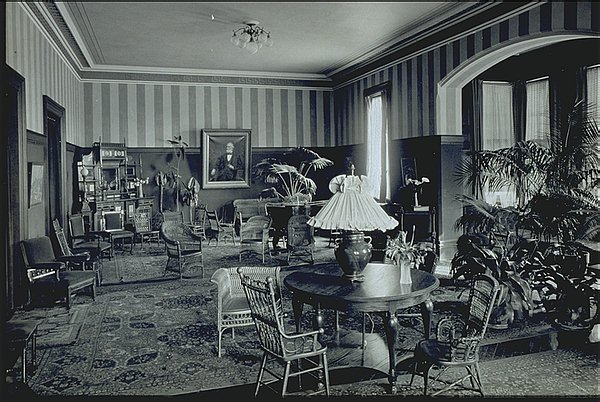
A student drawing room

In the 1930s, Sage became a graduate student dormitory. As most University-run student housing was consolidated into the West and North Campus areas, Sage became something of an anomaly: it was the only student living facility in the central campus area, and the only building that combined living and classroom space. It also housed the Cornell Career Center in its eastern wing. While Sage rooms were spacious compared to other dorms, by the 1990s the facility was significantly run down, as the University, which planned to transform the entire building into classroom space, did little more than basic maintenance. The 1994–1995 school year was the last in which Sage housed students.

== Later years ==
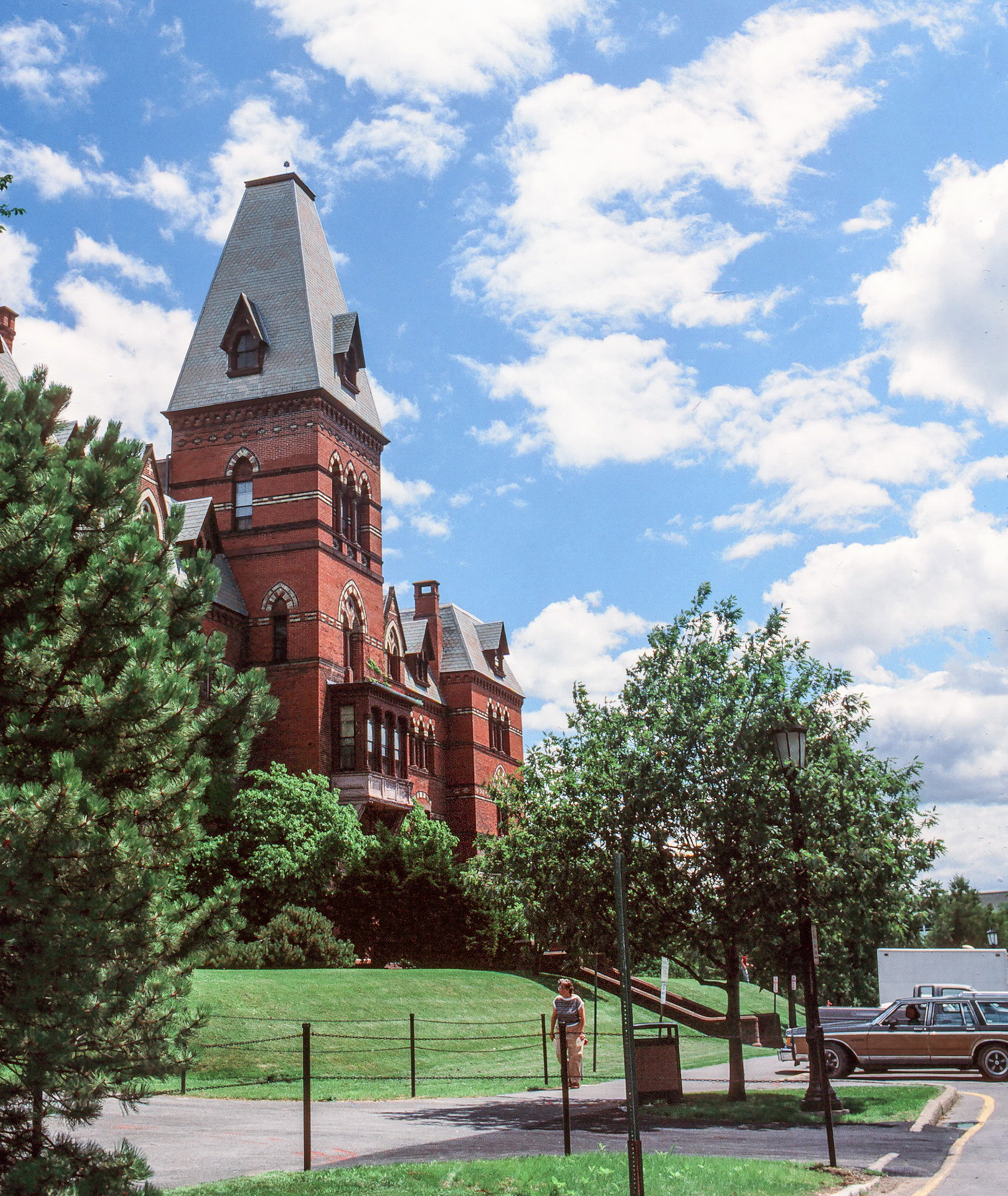
Sage Hall with truncated spire, in 1987. The spire was restored in the late 1990s.

Between April 1996 and August 1998, the university undertook a renovation, at the cost of $38 million, to convert the building into the new home for the Johnson Graduate School of Management. The top segment of the building's iconic spire that had been removed years before was rebuilt. A glass ceiling was constructed over the inner courtyard, changing it into an atrium, using a design inspired by the main exhibition hall at the Oxford University Museum. Babcock's original design of Sage Hall had been influenced by that same museum's design.

== Cornerstone letter regarding nonsectarianism ==
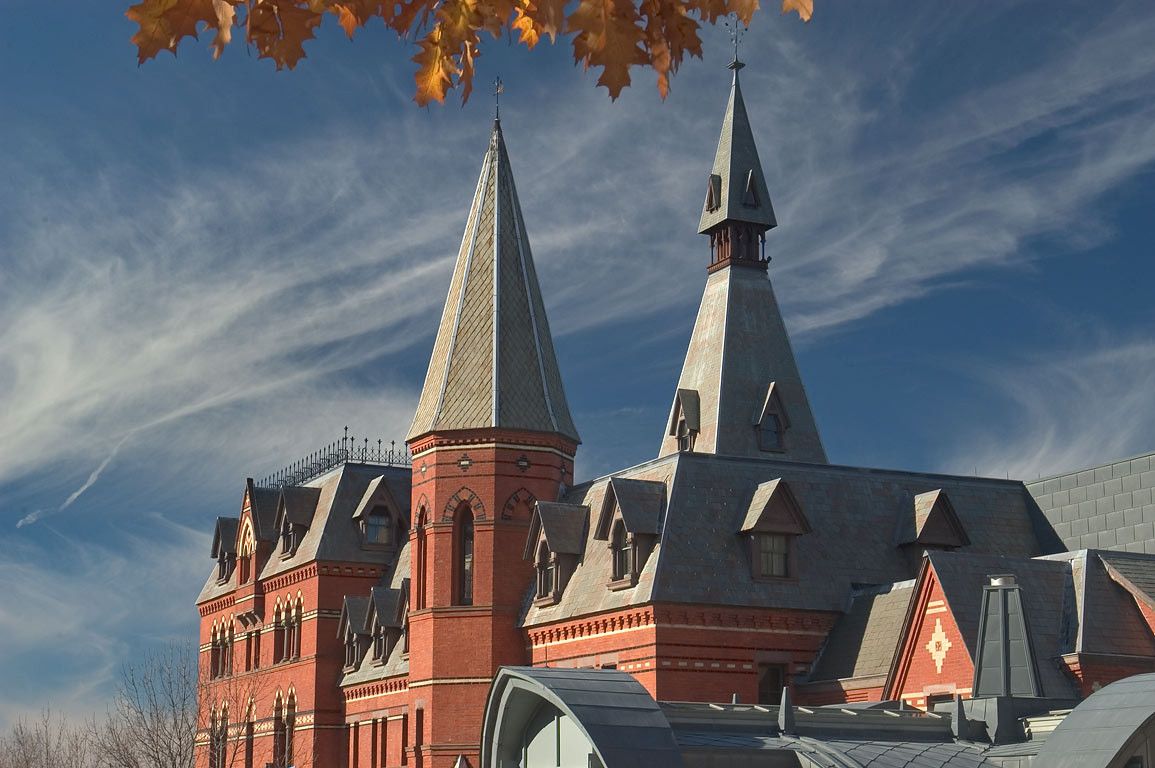
A side view of Sage Hall

Ezra Cornell was a birthright Quaker. He was later disowned by the Society of Friends for marrying outside of the faith to a Methodist by the name of Mary Ann Wood. Ezra and Mary Ann were married March 19, 1831, in Dryden, New York.

On February 24, 1832, a disheartened Ezra Cornell wrote the following response to his expulsion from The Society of Friends due to his marriage to Mary Ann Wood:

"I have always considered that choosing a companion for life was a very important affair and that my happiness or misery in this life depended on the choice ..."

He remarked that the nation was founded on the principle of separation of Church and State. Cornell felt the same way about the university; religious conservatives described the university in its early years as "Godless Cornell."

In 1873, when the cornerstone of Sage Hall was laid, Ezra Cornell wrote a letter for posterity—dated May 15, 1873—and sealed it into the cornerstone. No copies of the letter were made, and Cornell kept its contents a secret. However, he hinted at the theme of the letter during his speech at the dedication of Sage Hall, stating that "the letter deposited in the cornerstone addressed to the future man and woman, of which I have kept no copy, will relate to future generations the cause of the failure of this experiment, if it ever does fail, as I trust in God it never will."

Cornell historians largely assumed that the "experiment" to which Cornell referred was that of coeducation, given that Sage Hall was to be a women's dormitory and that coeducation was still a controversial issue. However, when the letter was finally unearthed in 1997, its focus was revealed to be the university's nonsectarian status—a principle that had invited controversy in the 19th century, given that most universities of the time had religious affiliations. Cornell wrote:

On the occasion of laying the corner stone of the Sage College for women of Cornell University, I desire to say that the principle [sic] danger, and I say almost the only danger I see in the future to be encountered by the friends of education, and by all lovers of true liberty is that which may arise from sectarian strife.

From these halls, sectarianism must be forever excluded, all students must be left free to worship God, as their concience [sic] shall dictate, and all persons of any creed or all creeds must find free and easy access, and a hearty and equal welcome, to the educational facilities possessed by the Cornell University.

Coeducation of the sexes and entire freedom from sectarian or political preferences is the only proper and safe way for providing an education that shall meet the wants of the future and carry out the founders [sic] idea of an Institution where "any person can find instruction in any study." I herewith commit this great trust to your care.

== Notable alumnae ==
- Sara Winifred Brown - prominent African American teacher and doctor
- Anna Botsford Comstock – professor and scientist, namesake of Cornell's Comstock Hall
- Jessie Redmon Fauset - African American editor, poet, essayist, novelist, and educator
- Julia Josephine Thomas Irvine – fourth president of Wellesley College
- Harriet May Mills – women's suffragist
- Ruth Putnam – publisher and author
- M. Carey Thomas – second president of Bryn Mawr College
