= Lourdes Casanova =

American academic

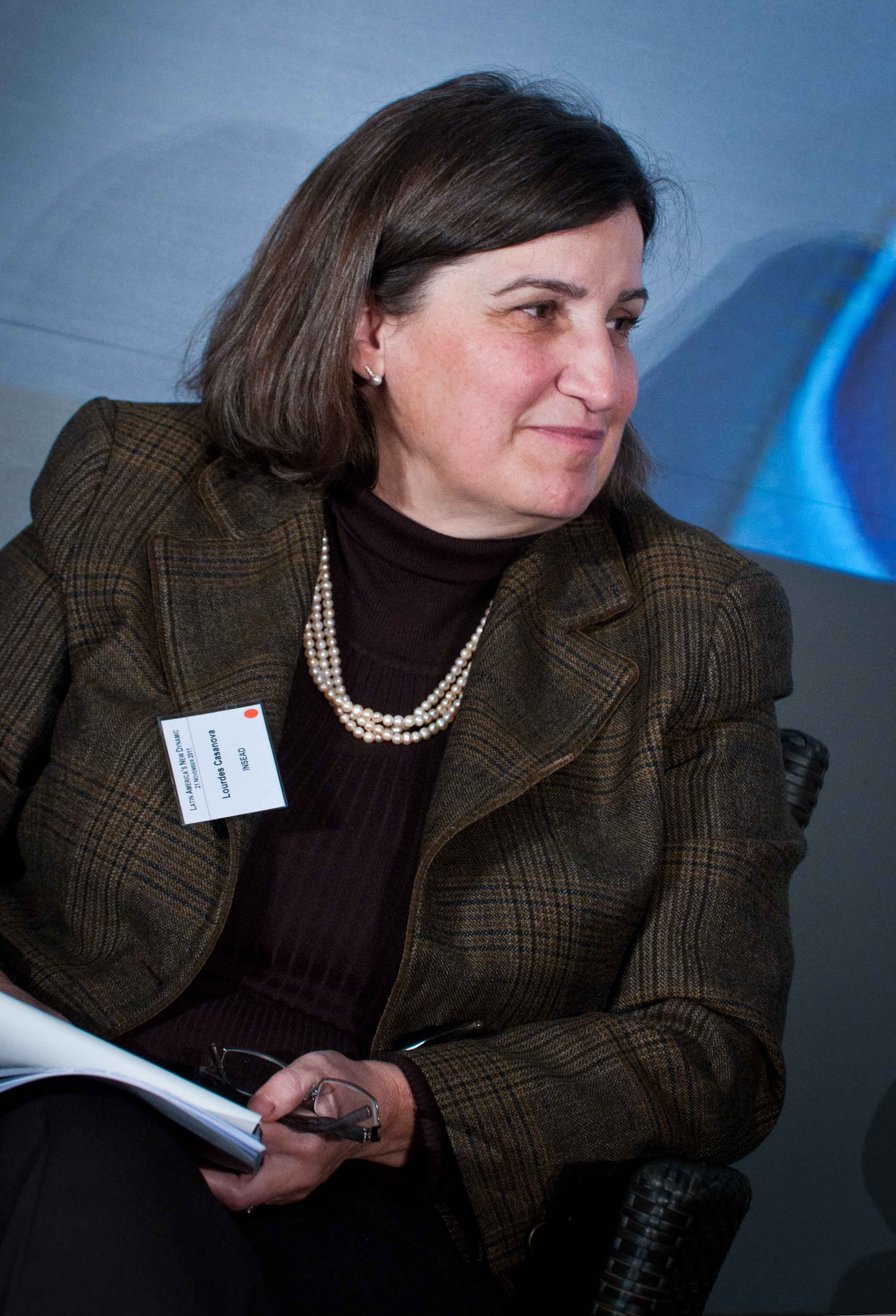
- Born: Lourdes S. Casanova; Fraga, Spain
- Education: Universiteit van Amsterdam (M.A.), University of Southern California (M.A.), Universitat de Barcelona (Ph.D.)
- Spouse: Soumitra Dutta
- Children: Sara Dutta
- Scientific career
- Fields: International business, Latin America, emerging markets
- Workplaces: Johnson School at Cornell University, INSEAD
- Website: www.johnson.cornell.edu/faculty-research/faculty/lc683/

Lourdes S. Casanova is an academic, author and currently a Senior Lecturer of Management at the Samuel Curtis Johnson Graduate School of Management and Gail and Rob Cañizares Director of the Emerging Markets Institute. Before her appointment to Johnson School, Casanova was a lecturer in the Strategy Department at INSEAD. She specializes in international business with a focus on Latin America and multinationals from emerging markets. In 2014 and 2015, Lourdes Casanova was appointed as one of the 50 most influential Iberoamerican intellectuals by Esglobal. Also, she is member of the Board of Directors of Boyce Thompson Institute.

== Affiliations ==
Lourdes Casanova is a Senior Lecturer of Management at the S.C. Johnson Graduate School of Business, Cornell University, since 2012. She is also the Gail and Rob Cañizares Director of the Emerging Markets Institute. For the previous 23 years she was a lecturer in the Strategy Department of INSEAD.

Past teaching experiences include visiting faculty positions and guest lecturer assignments at Tecnológico de Monterrey, HEC Montréal, ESADE Business School, Universitat Pompeu Fabra, San Diego University's School of Business Administration, Oxford University’s Latin American Center, Cambridge Judge Business School, Universidad Autónoma de Barcelona’s Institute of European Studies, Universität Zürich, and Haas School of Business. She is a visiting professor at Wenzhou University, China.

Casanova is also a former awardee of the Fulbright Scholar Program.

She is a member of the Global Agenda Council on Latin America. Also, she's a member of the Competitiveness in Latin America Task Force and of the Global Agenda Council on Latin America of the World Economic Forum. Furthermore, she is a board member and chairperson of the Compensation Committee of the Boyce Thompson Institute, a member of the Advisory Committee European Union/Brazil, the World Investment Network of the UNCTAD, B20 Business Summit's Information and Communication Technologies and Innovation task force, a reviewer of Strategy Management Journal, and was responsible at INSEAD of the Goldman Sachs 10,000 Women Initiative. She is a board member of a start-up Documenta, a member of the Network of Interdisciplinary Research in Family Firms and the Nominating committee of the World Innovation Summit (HiT Barcelona). She is also member in the Executive Committee of the Cornell Institute for European Studies (CIES), member of the advisory board of the Tompkins County Public Library, a member of the NCE Standing Selection Committee, and a founding Board Member of the Societé des Amis du Chateau de Fontainebleau. She is also a consultant at the Inter-American Development Bank.

Casanova speaks Catalan, Spanish, French, English, Portuguese, Italian and Dutch.

== Current books ==
As of January 2023 the following books were published:

- Casanova, L.; Miroux, A. 2022. Emerging Markets Report 2022. Emerging Market Multinationals, Reinventing Global Value Chains. 4 November 2022. ISBN 978-1-7328042-6-5. ISSN 2689-0127
- Casanova, L.; Miroux, A. 2021. Emerging Markets Report 2021. Emerging Market Multinationals, building the future on ESG excellence. 5 November 2021. ISBN 978-1-7328044-4-1. ISSN 2689-0127
- Cahen. F.; Casanova, L.; Miroux, A. (editors) 2021. From copycats to Leaders: Innovation from Emerging Markets. Cambridge University Press. ISBN 978-1-108-48686-6 https://www.cambridge.org/es/academic/subjects/management/international-business/innovation-emerging-markets-copycats-leaders?format=HB https://www.amazon.com/Innovation-Emerging-Markets-Copycats-Leaders/dp/110848686X
- Casanova, L.; Miroux, A. 2020. Emerging Markets Report 2020. 10 Years that Changed Emerging Markets. 6 November 2020. ISBN 978-1-7328042-4-1. ISSN 2689-0127
- Casanova, L.; Miroux, A. 2019. Emerging Markets Report 2019. Building Constructive Engagement. 8 November 2019. ISBN 978-1-7328042-3-4. ISSN 2689-0127
- Casanova, L.; Miroux, A. 2019. The Era of Chinese Multinationals: How Chinese Companies Are Conquering the World. Academic Press. Elsevier. http://bit.ly/bookchina Paperback ISBN 9780128168578 eBook ISBN 9780128170601
- Casanova, L.; Cornelius, P. and Dutta, S. 2017. Entrepreneurship and the Finance of Innovation in Emerging Markets. Elsevier.
- Taotao Chen, Lourdes Casanova, Chen Chen, Run Xu. 2017. Transnational Companies from China and Latin America. Lessons from a comparative analysis. 2017. Report for CAF. Taotao Chen, Lourdes Casanova, Chen Chen, Run Xu.
- Casanova, L. (2017). Claroscuros en las relaciones entre América Latina y China. Pensamiento Iberoamericano. Revista de la Secretaría General Iberoamerican. 3a época/01/2017. pp 140–147.
- Casanova, L. (2017). I beroamérica mira hacia el futuro. 4 July 2017. Esglobal/Secretaría Permanente de las Cumbres Iberoamericanas.
- Casanova, L. (2017). Iberoamérica antes una nueva encrucijada económica. Esglobal. 4 July 2017.
- Casanova, L. (2017). La voz de España en un mundo lleno de ruido. Esglobal. 22 May 2017.

Casanova with Anne Miroux wrote the forthcoming Emerging Multinationals coming of age. Casanova with P. Hertenstein and B. Hobdari edited the 2016 book New Wine in Old Bottles? The Role of Emerging Markets Multinationals in advancing IB Theory and Research in the International Journal of Emerging Markets, a special Issue. in 2015, Casanova with Julian Kasum wrote the book Brazil - A Economia Política de uma Potência Global Emergente. This book is available in English.

Casanova is coauthor of the book The Political Economy of an Emerging Global Power: In Search of the Brazil Dream, published in 2014, and author of the book Global Latinas: Latin America’s emerging multinationals, published in 2009. Furthermore, she coauthored “Innovalatino, Fostering Innovation in Latin America” in 2011 and “El papel de España en los Lazos Económicos entre Asia y Latinoamérica: Grandes empresas, Pymes y la ciudad de Barcelona como puentes entre las dos zonas” (“The Role of Spain in the Economic Relations between Asia and Latin America: Big companies, SMEs, and the city of Barcelona as bridges between the two zones”) in 2012.

== Selected works ==
Casanova has published numerous reports, case studies, chapters in books and articles in journals including Beijing Business Review, International Journal of Human Resource Management, Business and Politics, and Foreign Affairs Latinoamerica.

- Casanova, L. (2021). La pandemia, un punto de inflexión para las empresas españolas en Iberoamérica y en el mundo Documentos de Trabajo 48 / 2021 (2ª época). Madrid. Fundación Carolina. https://www.fundacioncarolina.es/dt_fc_48/ ISSN-e: 1885-9119 doi:10.33960/issn-e.1885-9119.DT48
- Casanova, L. 2021. La Estrategia Comercial de Biden. ¿Será Latinoamérica una prioridad para el nuevo gobierno de Estados Unidos? Foreign Affairs Latinoamérica. Volumen 21. Númro 1. Enero-Marzo 2021. http://revistafal.com/la-estrategia-comercial-de-biden/
- Casanova, L. 2020. Las Multinacionales españolas ante un futuro incierto. In Geopolítica y Comercio en tiempos de cambio. Una mirada desde Barcelona. P. García-Durán Huet and Eloi Serrano Robles (eds.) December 2020. Monografías CIDOB 79. ISBN 978-84-92511-86-0 Barcelona. https://www.cidob.org/es/articulos/monografias/geopolitica/las_multinacionales_espanolas_ante_un_futuro_incierto https://www.cidob.org/es/publicaciones/serie_de_publicacion/monografias/monografias/geopolitica_y_comercio_en_tiempos_de_cambio_una_mirada_desde_barcelona
- Casanova, L. 2020. El daño económico del covid-19 en Latinoamérica. Foreign Affairs Latinoamérica. Volumen 20. Número 3. ITAM. July/September 2020. http://revistafal.com/fal-20-3/
- Casanova, L. and A. Miroux. 2019. “The Rise of Chinese Multinationals: The Changing Landscape of Global Competition” in Vecchi A. (eds.) Chinese Acquisitions in Developed Countries. Measuring Operations Performance. Springer, cham. Switzerland AG.
- Casanova, L. Taotao Chen, Chen Chen & Run Xu (2019) Emerging multinationals from China and Latin America: a comparative analysis, Transnational Corporations Review, doi:10.1080/19186444.2018.1564469
- Casanova, L.; Miroux, A. 2018. Special Issue (Transnational Corporation Review. Special Issue. Volume 10, Number 4, December 2018. Emerging Market Multinationals and Economic Development. Taylor & Francis online. doi:10.1080/19186444.2019.1573599
- Emerging market multinationals reshaping the business landscape. (2018). Transnational Corporations Review. Transnational Corporations Review, Volume 10. Issue 4. Pages: 285-295. 2019-03-21 doi:10.1080/19186444.2018.1560241.
- Casanova, L.; Miroux, A. 2018. Emerging Markets Report 2018. Emerging Markets Reshaping Globalization. 9 November 2018. ISBN 978-1-7328042-2-7.
- Casanova, L. and A. Miroux 2017, “The Rise of the Global Chinese Company” in OECD EMnet (2017), “Business Insights on Emerging Markets 2016”, OECD Emerging Markets Network, OECD Development Centre, Paris.
- Casanova, L. and Kassum, J. 2017. Are Brazilian Multinationals competitive enough? In Multilatinas: Strategies for Internationalization. Andonova, V., and Losada, M. (editors). Cambridge University Press.
- Casanova, L.; Miroux, A. 2017. Emerging Market Multinationals Report: Emerging Multinationals in a Changing World. Emerging Markets Institute. S.C. Johnson School of Management. Cornell University.
- Casanova, L. and Miroux, A. 2016. The Rise of Emerging Market Multinationals: this is how they can become industry leaders. 8 December 2016. Blog. World Economic Forum.
- Casanova, L. and A. Miroux (2016), Emerging Multinationals: The Coming of Age in OECD EMnet (2016), “Business Insights on Emerging Markets 2015”, OECD Emerging Markets Network, OECD Development Centre, Paris, http://www.oecd.org/dev/oecdemnet.htm.
- Casanova, L.; Miroux, A. 2016. The Emerging Multinationals Report (EMR) 2016, The China Surge. Emerging Markets Institute. S.C. Johnson School of Management. Cornell University.
- Casanova, L.; Chen C.; Taotao C.: 2016. China and Latin America Go Global: A Comparison of the Characteristics and Development Phases of Outward Foreign Direct Investment. EMI Johnson Working Papers. Cornell University.
- Casanova, L.; Bacaria, Josep M.; Coll, J.M.; Rullán, S. 2016. A Comparative Analysis of the Innovation Systems of Brazil, Korea and Mexico. EMI Johnson Working Papers. Cornell University. https://ssrn.com/abstract=2593068
- Casanova, L. 2016. China and Latin America Go Global: A Comparison of the Characteristics and Development Phases of Outward Foreign Direct Investment. EMI Johnson Working Papers. Cornell University.
- Casanova, L. and Sukriti Jain. 2016. Innovation in Latin America. In Haar, J. and Ernst, R. (editors), Innovation in Emerging Markets. International Political Economy series. Palgrave Macmillan.
- Casanova, L. and A. Miroux. 2016, “Emerging Multinationals: The Coming of Age” in OECD EMnet (2016), “Business Insights on Emerging Markets 2015”, OECD Emerging Markets Network, OECD Development Centre, Paris
- Casanova, L. 2016. Latin American Multinationals moving ahead. In Fernández, P. and Lluch, A. (editors). Evolution of Family Business: Continuity and Change in Latin America and Spain. Edward Elgar.
- Peña-Vinces, JC. Casanova, L. Guillen, J. & Urbano D. 2016. International Competitiveness of Small and Medium-sized Enterprises: Peru, a Latin-American Emerging Market. Emerging Markets Finance and Trade. doi:10.1080/1540496X.2016.1156525 (in press).
- Rullá n S. and Casanova, L. 2015. Innovation in Latin America: the Case of Mexico. Special Issue of Dubrovnik International Economic Meeting in International Journal of Business and Economic Sciences Applied Research. Vol. 8 Issue 3: 59-68. December 2015.
- Casanova, L. Latin American multinationals facing the new reality. 2015. Revista Brasileira de Comercio Exterior (RBCE) nr. 123. Ano XXIX. A revista da Funcex: Fundaçao Centro Estudos de Comércio Exterior. Brazil. April–May–June 2015.
- Casanova, L. & Kassum, J. 2014. The Brasília Consensus: Looking for a second wind. The World Financial Review. September–October.

== Awards ==
- Awarded in 2017 - One of the 30 most influential Iberoamerican women intellectuals by Esglobal.
- Awarded in 2014 and 2015 – One of the 50 most influential Iberoamerican intellectuals by Esglobal, published by the Foundation for International Relations and Dialogue (Fundación para las Relaciones Internacionales y el Diálogo Exterior, FRIDE), offspring of Foreign Policy en español).

In 1987 she was awarded the Fulbright Scholar Program.

== Media articles and interviews ==
- Casanova, L. 2021. Sólo ganamos si nadie pierde. 28 March. El Pais. Madrid. Spain. https://elpais.com/economia/2021-03-28/solo-ganamos-si-nadie-pierde.html
- CASANOVA, L. 2020. BLOG AGENDA PUBLICA. EL MUNDO DE BIDEN: ¿DÓNDE QUEDA AMÉRICA LATINA? Nov 14, 2020. Agenda Pública. http://agendapublica.elpais.com/el-mundo-de-biden-donde-queda-america-latina/
- Casanova, L. ¿Qué cambiará con China? La Vanguardia. Barcelona. Spain. October 25, 2020.
- Casanova, L. 2020. Whatever it takes: Latin America’s solution to the crisis. Latin Trade. August–October 2020. https://latintrade.com/wp-content/uploads/2020/08/LT.2.2020-low.opti_.edit_.cjr_.pdf
- Casanova, L. 2020 ¿Quién está al Mando? El País. Spain. 15 August 2020. https://elpais.com/economia/2020-08-15/quien-esta-al-mando.html
- Interview by CNN en español. "¿Se complica el panorama para la minera brasileña Vale?". 29 January 2019.
- Interview by Zhen Xin. January 18, 2019. "Chinese firms eyeing South American market".
- Casanova, L. 2018. "The Challenges of Chinese investments in Latin America". 15 March 2018. World Economic Forum.
- "Latinoamérica debe depender menos de las materias primas" 29 March 2015. Portafolio. Colombia
- "Global Latinas in Search of a second wind" 2015. Latin Trade.
- "To go or not to go. The internationalization Imperative for Global Latinas". Latin Trade. March–April 2015
- "What next for BNDES and Brazil banks’ overseas expansion?" October 20, 2014. Business News Americas.
- "Brazil can’t lose the World Cup, even if it doesn’t win". Jeroen Ansink. Fortune. 10 June 2014.
- "Who is who in internationalization: Interview with Prof. Lourdes Casanova". Estrategiaparatodos. 15 July 2013. Blog Evodio Kaltenecker.
- "Innovation Or Bust - Latin Trade Group". Latin Trade. 4 April 2013. Ryan Dube.
- "Inovação em mercados emergentes - Economia". O Estado de S. Paulo. 1 October 2012. Casanova, L.

Casanova is a regular contributor to CNN en español. She also regularly writes opinion columns in the Latin Trade magazine.

== Research interests ==
- Emerging markets, with a special focus on Latin America
- Emerging multinationals
- Corporate social responsibility in emerging multinationals
- Women in business in Latin America
- Family business networks
- Innovation in emerging markets
