= Soumitra Dutta =

Indian academic and author

Professor Soumitra Dutta
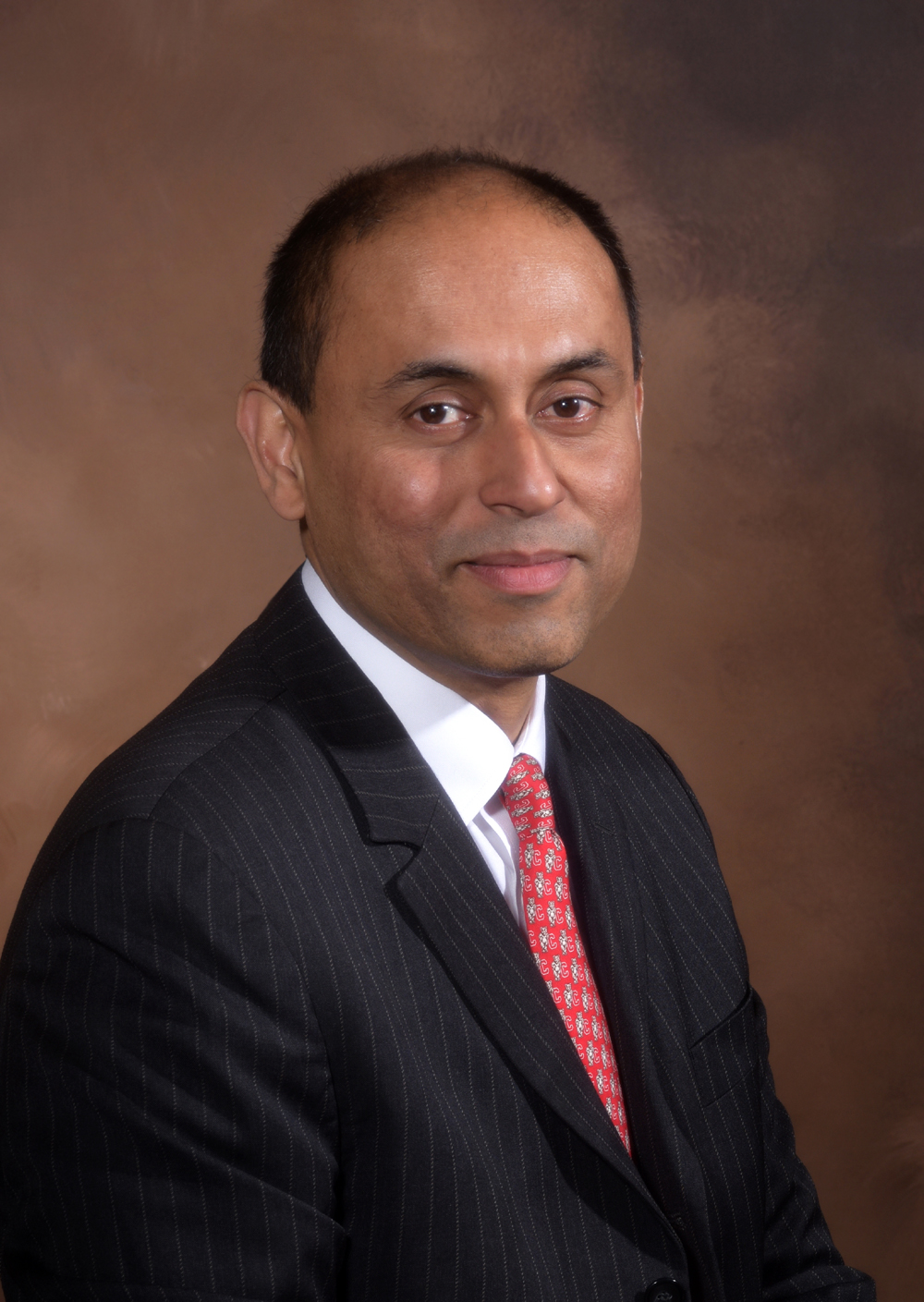
- Education: Indian Institute of Technology Delhi (B.Tech.) University of California, Berkeley (M.S., Ph.D.)
- Occupations: University Dean, academic, author and entrepreneur
- Spouse: Lourdes Casanova

Soumitra Dutta is an Indian academic, author and entrepreneur. He is the Director and Co-Founder of the Portulans Institute and serves as Executive Director for the SRM group of universities in India. He was the dean of Saïd Business School at the University of Oxford from June 2022 to September 2025, when he resigned. His resignation followed allegations of sexual harassment towards a junior academic. He was previously a professor of management and the founding dean of the SC Johnson College of Business at Cornell University in New York. He served as dean of the SC Johnson College of Business from 2012 to 2018, during which he resigned without an official explanation but continued working as a faculty member. A student Republican newspaper rebutted rumors of sexual misconduct. Before his appointment to Cornell, he was the Roland Berger professor of business and technology at INSEAD.

== Early life and education ==
Dutta attended the Indian Institutes of Technology in New Delhi, graduating with a B.Tech. in Electrical Engineering & Computer Science in 1985. In 2017, he received a Distinguished Alumnus award from IIT. He continued his education at Berkeley University of California, earning an M.S in computer science in 1987, an M.S in Business Administration in 1989, and a Ph.D in computer science in 1990.

== Career ==
Dutta joined INSEAD's faculty as an Assistant Professor of Information Systems in the Technology Management Area in 1989, later serving as Dean of Technology and E-learning, Dean of Executive Education, and Dean of External Relations.

In 2008, he founded Fisheye Analytics, which provided analytics for social media. In 2013, it was acquired by the WPP group.

In 2012, he joined Cornell University as Dean of the Samuel Curtis Johnson Graduate School of Management and later became the founding dean of its business school - SC Johnson College of Business - in 2016. Dutta served as dean until January 2018 when he resigned abruptly with neither Dutta or the university providing an explanation.

In 2014, he was part of President Obama's White House round table with business school deans on effective workforce policies. Dutta has been a member of the board of Sodexo between 2014 and 2020. He is also a board member of Dassault Systèmes, which he has been on since 2017.

In 2018, he was appointed as a Member of the Shareholder Council, at ZS Consulting. He has been the Chair of the Board of the Global Business School Network since 2018. Dutta is the president and Co-Founder, Portulans Institute which was set up in 2019, as an independent non-profit research institute based in Washington DC.

On 1 June 2022, Dutta became the new Dean of Saïd Business School at Oxford University, replacing interim dean Sue Dobson. Dutta resigned in September 2025., when the university concluded a five-month investigation that substantiated three complaints of sexual harassment made by a female academic. The inquiry found that on one occasion he "made a romantic advance" towards a female colleague after she had sought protection from him from an incident of sexual assault. It is alleged he said "I feel very attracted to you. Can something happen between us?" which Dutta denies. He told The Times through his lawyer "I deeply regret causing any distress or offence by anything I said".

== Personal life ==
Dutta is married to fellow academic Lourdes Casanova.

== Publications ==
Dutta is the founder and co-editor of fourteen editions of the Global Innovation Index which is published with the World Intellectual Property Organization.

Dutta is a founding co-editor of the annual Global Information Technology Report published by the World Economic Forum, and the founder of the annual Global Innovation Index published by the World Intellectual Property Organization.

His other books include:

- Throwing Sheep in the Boardroom: How Online Social Networking Will Transform Your Life, Work and World - Co-authored with INSEAD's Matthew Fraser, the book examines the global rise of platforms such as Facebook, MySpace, YouTube, Wikipedia, and Twitter.
- Innovating at the Top: How Global CEOs Drive Innovation for Growth and Profit - Co-authored with Roland Berger, Tobias Raffel and Geoffrey Samuels, the book includes interviews with chief executive officers at nine major international corporations — 3M, Bosch, Genentech, Infosys, Nokia, Research in Motion, SAP, Toyota, and Unilever.
- Finger, Lutz; Dutta, Soumitra (2014). Ask, measure, learn : using social media analytics to understand and influence customer behavior. Sebastopol. ISBN 978-1-4493-3684-4. OCLC 869548397.
- Entrepreneurship and the Finance of Innovation in Emerging Markets - Co-authored with his wife, Lourdes Casanova and Peter Cornelius of the Emerging Markets Institute at Cornell's Johnson School, the book includes a perspective on the links among macro-level innovation data, micro-entrepreneurial process data, and venture capital supply.
- Dutta, Soumitra (2021). The world after Covid-19. Dan LeClair, Veneta Andonova, Global Business School Network. Washington, DC. ISBN 979-8-7436-5644-8. OCLC 1258545837.
- InnovaLatino: Fostering Innovation in Latin America (co-edited with Mario Pezzini, published by Ariel and Fundación Telefónica in collaboration with Editorial Planeta, May 2011).
- The New Internet World: A Global Perspective on Freedom of Expression, Privacy, Trust and Security Online - Co-authored with William Dutton, founding director of the Oxford Internet Institute, and Ginette Law, it focuses on online freedom of expression, privacy, trust, and security.
