= Robert J. Swieringa =

Robert Jay Swieringa (born 1942) was the ninth Dean and is a professor emeritus of the Cornell Johnson Graduate School of Management at Cornell University. He also served as an elected member to General Electric Company board of directors.

== Education ==
Swieringa earned his BA from Augustana College in 1964. He then attended the University of Denver and earned his MBA in 1965. He concluded his studies with a PhD in Accountancy from the University of Illinois Gies College of Business in 1969.

== Career ==
Swieringa held tenure or tenure track positions at the Stanford Graduate School of Business, the Cornell Johnson Graduate School of Management, and Yale School of Management. He also held visiting positions at Harvard Business School.

== Board memberships ==
He served on the Financial Accounting Standards Board, the standard-setting body responsible for U.S. Generally Accepted Accounting Principles, from 1986 to 1996. Swieringa also played a governing role in graduate business school admissions as a chair of the board of directors of the Graduate Management Admission Council, which provides the Graduate Management Admission Test.

== Selected works ==
- Toward Reporting Comprehensive Income (with L. Todd Johnson and Cheri L. Reither), Accounting Horizons (1995).
- Management Accounting and Action (with Karl E. Weick), in Readings in Accounting for Management Control (1983).
- An Assessment of Laboratory Experiments in Accounting (with Karl E. Weick), Journal of Accounting Research (1982).
- Organizational Views of Transfer Pricing (with John H. Waterhouse), Accounting, Organizations and Society (1982).
- An Accounting Change and Information Processing Changes (with Thomas R. Dyckman and Robert E. Hoskin), Accounting, Organizations and Society (1982).
- The Relationship between Managers' Budget-Oriented Behavior and Selected Attitude, Position, Size, and Performance Measures (with Robert H. Moncur), Journal of Accounting Research (1972).
