= Alan Merten =

American academic administrator (1941–2020)

Alan G. Merten
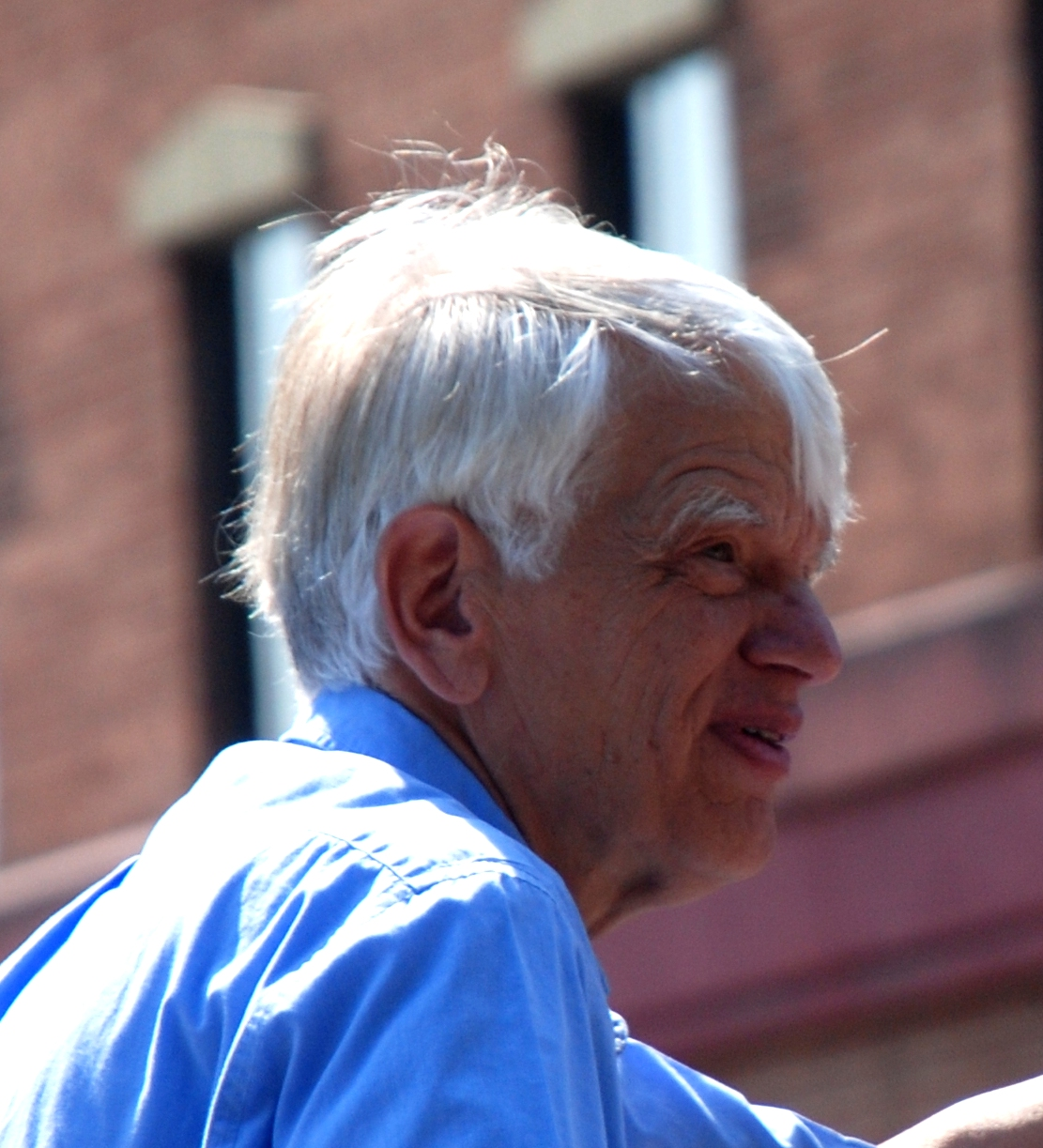

President of George Mason University
- In office 1996 – June 30, 2012
- Preceded by: George W. Johnson
- Succeeded by: Ángel Cabrera

Personal details
- Born: Alan Gilbert Merten; December 27, 1941 Milwaukee, Wisconsin, U.S.
- Died: May 21, 2020 (aged 78) Naples, Florida, U.S.
- Education: University of Wisconsin-Madison (BS, PhD); Stanford University (MS)

Alan Gilbert Merten (December 27, 1941 – May 21, 2020) was the fifth president of George Mason University.

== Early life and education ==
Merten was born on December 27, 1941, in Milwaukee, Wisconsin. He received his undergraduate degree in mathematics from the University of Wisconsin–Madison, a masters in computer science from Stanford University, and a PhD in Computer Science at the University of Wisconsin–Madison.

== Career ==
Merten began his academic career as an engineering professor at the University of Michigan in Ann Arbor, Michigan. He was then appointed dean of the College of Business Administration at the University of Florida in Gainesville, Florida, and then dean of the Samuel Curtis Johnson Graduate School of Management at Cornell University, an Ivy League university in Ithaca, New York.

In 1996, Merten joined George Mason University as the university's fifth president. He retired on June 30, 2012.

== Personal life ==
Merten was married to Sally Merten, and they had two children and four grandsons.

== Death ==
Merten died on May 21, 2020, at a nursing home in Naples, Florida at age 78, following a battle with Parkinson's disease.
