= L. Joseph Thomas =

American educator and administrator (born 1942)

- Born: January 16, 1942 (age 84); Barnesville, Ohio
- Education: Carnegie Mellon University (B.S.); Yale University (Ph.D.)
- Occupations: Academician, administrator
- Spouse: Margaret Gilboy Thomas
- Children: 2

Louis Joseph Thomas (born January 16, 1942) is an American educator and administrator who is the Anne and Elmer Lindseth Dean Emeritus and professor of operations management of the Samuel Curtis Johnson Graduate School of Management at Cornell University. He served Johnson as its dean for five years, prior to returning to the faculty in 2012.
