= C. Stewart Sheppard =

American educator

- Born: November 25, 1915; Caerphilly, Wales
- Died: March 7, 2002 (aged 86); Williamsburg, Virginia
- Education: New York University; Columbia University
- Occupations: Academician, administrator, advisor

Charles Stewart Sheppard (November 25, 1915 – March 7, 2002) was an American educator and third dean of the S.C. Johnson School of Business at Cornell University.

Sheppard began his teaching career as a Professor of Economics and Associate Dean at New York University. From 1957 to 1962, he served as the fourth Dean of the S.C. Johnson Graduate School of Management at Cornell.

Following his work at Cornell, Sheppard served as the founding Executive Director of the Institute of Chartered Financial Analysts in the late 1960s. The C. Stewart Sheppard Award is given by the CFA Institute in recognition of outstanding contribution to continuing education in the CFA profession.

After serving at the CFA Institute, Sheppard taught at the University of Virginia’s Darden School of Business Administration. The C. Stewart Sheppard Professor of Business Administration at the Darden School is named in his honor. The Darden also awards the C. Stewart Sheppard Distinguished Service Award to recognize first-year students exhibiting exceptional service to the School. (The Dean and his spouse also donated two Nyssa sylvatic (sourgum) for beautification of the Virginia grounds.)

Sheppard moved to the United States in 1939. During the Second World War, he served as a First Lieutenant in the United States Army. In 1989, Dean Sheppard retired to Williamsburg, Virginia.

He took his M.B.A. at New York University, and his Ph.D. at Columbia University following the Second World War.
