= Paul M. O'Leary =

American economist (1901–1997)

- Born: November 29, 1901; Lawrence, Kansas, United States
- Died: December 25, 1997 (aged 96); Ithaca, New York, United States
- Education: B.A. M.A. (1924); Ph.D. (1929)
- Alma mater: University of Kansas; Harvard University; Cornell University
- Occupations: Academic, administrator, advisor
- Spouse: Harriet (Barton) O'Leary

Paul Martin O'Leary (November 29, 1901 – December 25, 1997) was an American economist and educator, and the first Dean of the S.C. Johnson Graduate School of Management. He served on the faculty of Cornell University from 1924 until 1967, taking several leaves to join other economists from Eastern universities in Franklin D. Roosevelt's brain trust.

With John H. Patterson, he authored An Introduction to Money, Banking and Corporations in 1937.

== Early life and family ==
He was spouse to Harriet Barton O'Leary, daughter of Colonel Frank Barton, for whom Barton Hall is named. Whenever on campus, he was quick to volunteer for activities that brought him in contact with undergraduates students, first as time-keeper and assistant coach for the Cornell Track & Field Team and later a proponent for Track & Field as a faculty member of the university's committee on athletics.

== Career ==
During the Depression, O'Leary was an aide to the consumer advisory board of the National Recovery Administration and later was chief economic analyst for the Commerce Department. He oversaw the rationing program as the deputy chief of the Office of Price Administration in the early years of World War II. O'Leary returned to Cornell, and in 1946 served as the first dean of its newly formed business school. In 1951, he became dean of the college of arts and sciences. The Century Foundation asked him to chair the seven person Committee on Anti-Trust Policy in 1953. In 1957, he returned to teaching and research in his specialty, American financial history.

== Associations ==
Professor O'Leary was tapped in the Phi Kappa Psi fraternity at the University of Kansas, and maintained the affiliation at Cornell.
