= Cornell Johnson Graduate School of Management =

Graduate business school of Cornell University

Coordinates: 42°26′45″N 76°28′59″W

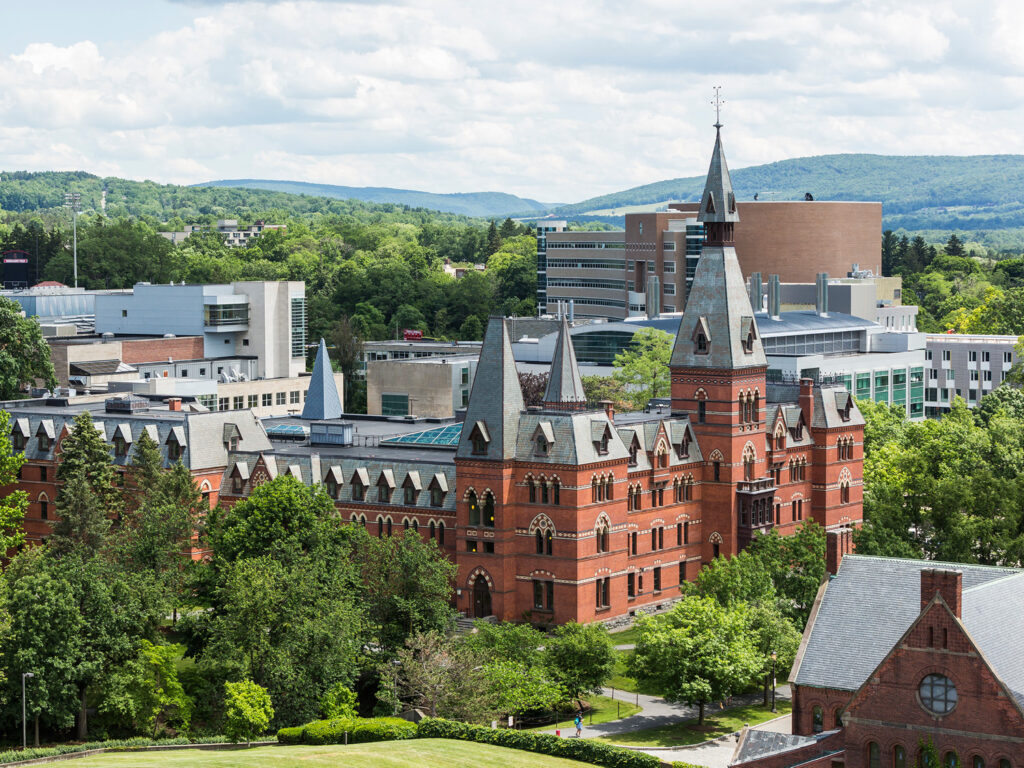
- Sage Hall at Cornell University, home of the Johnson School
- Type: Private business school
- Established: October 14, 1946
- Accreditation: AACSB International
- Affiliations: Cornell University
- Endowment: $482.5 million (2025)
- Dean: Vishal Gaur
- Faculty: 81
- Students: 583
- Location: Ithaca, New York, U.S.
- Website: business.cornell.edu/johnson/

The Cornell Johnson Graduate School of Management is the graduate business school of Cornell University, a private Ivy League research university in Ithaca, New York. Established in 1946, Johnson is one of six Ivy League business schools and offers the smallest full‑time MBA cohort of all Ivy League MBA programs, fostering an intimate and collaborative academic environment while also maintaining the third lowest acceptance rate. The Cornell Master of Business Administration (MBA) also offers a one-year Tech MBA at Cornell Tech in New York City, as well as the Cornell 1+1 MBA program, combining one year in Ithaca followed by one year at Cornell Tech. In 1984, Samuel Curtis Johnson Jr. and his family donated $20 million to the school, and in 2017 Herbert Fisk Johnson donated $150 million, the third largest gift to a business school in history. The endowment gift resulted in the school's renaming in honor of Johnson’s grandfather, Samuel Curtis Johnson, Sr., the founder of S.C. Johnson.

Johnson Graduate School of Management consistently ranks among the top 10 MBA programs in the United States based on average total starting salary. Graduates of the Cornell MBA earned a median first-year salary of $175,000, in addition to a signing bonus of $38,826, with 77.9% reporting a sign-on bonus— ranking as the second highest total compensation among MBA programs in the United States in 2023. With more than 70% of graduates receiving a sign-on bonus on average, the Johnson Graduate School of Management consistently ranks among the top 10 business schools in the United States based on average total starting salary and job offer success rate prior to graduation.

With an acceptance rate of 27.1%, the Johnson Graduate School of Management is the seventh most selective business school in the United States, and one of the most selective business schools in the world.

The Johnson School is housed in Sage Hall and supports more than 80 full-time faculty members. There are 600 students in the full-time, two-year Master of Business Administration program in Ithaca, as well as 40 Ph.D. students, all advised by Johnson faculty. The Johnson School is known for its rural setting and small class size — with close proximity to New York City. As such, both factors, combined with Johnson's commitment to the two-year MBA program in Ithaca and one-year MBA at Cornell Tech, contribute to its high giving rate of 1 in 4 among the 15,000 global Cornell MBA alumni, the third-highest alumni giving rate of all Ivy League business schools.

In 2017, Cornell University officially consolidated its two undergraduate business schools— the Dyson School of Applied Economics and Management and the Nolan School of Hotel School Administration — into the Johnson Graduate School of Management, forming the Cornell SC Johnson College of Business. The merger followed a $150 million donation from Herbert Fisk Johnson III, chairman and CEO of S.C. Johnson, accompanied by a 3:1 matching grant for a total contribution of $300 million to Cornell Johnson. Upon capitalization, this donation will raise Cornell Johnson's endowment to $692 million, ranking the Cornell MBA third in endowment per student within the Ivy League, and seventh in the world.

== History ==
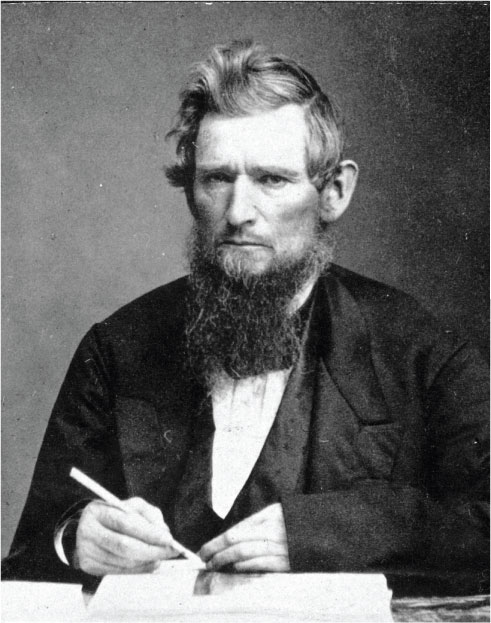
Seeds for a business school at Cornell by Ezra Cornell, co-founder of the university, a successful farmer and businessman, and co-founder of Western Union.

The Johnson School traces its beginnings to the university's founding in 1865. University co-founder Ezra Cornell proposed a Department of Trade and Commerce for the new university, which was "a radical departure from the day's conventional notions about higher education," as this proposal was made "sixteen years before Joseph Wharton endowed the nation's first collegiate business school at the University of Pennsylvania." At a university faculty meeting on October 2, 1868, Cornell co-founder and first president Andrew Dickson White, suggested the creation of a professorship in bookkeeping in the context of a larger proposal: the creation of a "commercial college." In the meantime, the Agriculture College continued to have a Department of Agricultural Economics that was established in 1909.

Formal movements towards a graduate business school began in 1914 when faculty in the NYS College of Agriculture convened the first meeting of the "Committee on a Commercial College". Led by economics professor Allyn Young, the committee recommended the creation of a "two-year graduate course leading to the Master's degree" in both business and public administration. Young had been trained at Harvard University, and the influence on the committee's discussion of its business school's creation only six years prior was apparent, as the committee's recommendations included instruction for graduate students only, selectivity in admissions, and integration into the larger university community.

The idea of a business school took a backseat to World War I and its effects on the Cornell population. Following the Armistice of 1918, third university president Jacob Gould Schurman called for the establishment of such a school, which he estimated would require $1 million of initial funding. However, financial difficulties surrounding the Great Depression would further delay its creation.

In 1984, the school was renamed in honor of Samuel Curtis Johnson, Sr. who founded S.C. Johnson & Son, Inc. The renaming followed his family's $20 million endowment gift to the school in his honor—at the time, the largest gift to any business school in the world.

In 1941, the university faculty recommended the creation of a School of Business and Public Administration, and it was unanimously approved on December 10, 1941, three days after the attack on Pearl Harbor. Cornell courted Paul M. O'Leary, who earned his doctorate at Cornell and was a member of Franklin D. Roosevelt's "brain trust," to be dean of the new school. O'Leary leveraged an offer to be dean of the business school at the University of Minnesota in negotiations for the Cornell position, ultimately signing for a salary of $9,000.

In 1946, Cornell University opened the School of Business and Public Administration, holding classes in McGraw Hall and charging $200 for tuition for the first year. The school awarded two degrees—MBA and MPA—and its primary national recruiters included the Guaranty Trust Company of New York, Eastman Kodak, DuPont, General Electric, AT&T, and IBM. In 1950 it gained acceptance of the Association to Advance Collegiate Schools of Business. O'Leary stepped down as dean of the business school in 1951 to become dean of the College of Arts and Sciences. Melvin G. deChazeau was appointed acting dean until 1954, when Edward H. Litchfield became dean. Under Lichfield's tenure, a Ph.D. program was established, the academic journal Administrative Science Quarterly was created, a joint JD/MBA program with the Law School was organized, and the school was renamed the Graduate School of Business and Public Administration. Litchfield left three years later for the chancellorship at the University of Pittsburgh and was replaced by C. Stewart Sheppard in 1957, followed by William D. Carmichael in 1962. In 1964, the school was relocated to Malott Hall, which was specifically designed to house it.

During this period faculty divisions began to emerge, with three distinct groups vying for resources: business management, public administration, and healthcare administration (the Sloan Program). In 1983, the faculty voted to end instruction in the latter two fields and to change the school's name to the Graduate School of Management. The public administration program moved to the NYS College of Human Ecology. That same year, the school began offering a dual-degree MBA/MA in Asian Studies with Cornell's FALCON (Full-year Asian Language Concentration) program, to produce American MBAs with some knowledge of the Japanese language and culture gained through coursework in Ithaca and a required summer internship in Japan. The school also created an MBA/MEng, originally called the Program in Manufacturing Management (PIMM). At the same time, Curtis W. Tarr was appointed the dean of the school.

In 1984, Samuel Curtis Johnson, Jr. and his family donated $20 million to the school, which was renamed the S.C. Johnson Graduate School of Management in honor of Johnson's grandfather, Samuel Curtis Johnson, Sr., the founder of S.C. Johnson & Son, Inc. The endowment gift to the university was, at the time, the largest gift to any business school in the world. In 1989, Alan G. Merten was appointed dean of the Johnson School. The year 1995 saw the creation of the Johnson School's first website, as well as the launch of its first 12-month option class. Merten left in 1996 to be President of George Mason University.

In 1998, the school was relocated to the newly renovated Sage Hall which had previously served as a dormitory, the school started the student-managed Cayuga MBA Fund, and the Parker Center for Investment Research was established. In 1999, the Johnson School began offering an Executive MBA. In 2004, the Center for Sustainable Global Enterprise was established. L. Joseph Thomas was appointed interim dean in 2007 and eventually the official dean in 2008. In Fall 2010, the school was rebranded in logo and in name: the Johnson Graduate School of Management at Cornell University, or simply Johnson at Cornell University or Johnson. In 2010, the Emerging Markets Institute was established.

In 2011, Johnson hosted Facebook-sponsored 3-Day Startup (3DS), an event where participants worked to start a technology company over the course of three days. Later that year, a Johnson team consisting of student portfolio managers in the school's $10 million Cayuga MBA Fund won second place in CNBC's "MBA Face-Off" edition of its Million Dollar Portfolio Challenge, a nine-week, real-time fantasy stock and currency trading competition.

In 2012, Soumitra Dutta became dean of the school, followed by Mark W. Nelson after Dutta became dean of the new Cornell College of Business. In 2017, Cornell University officially consolidated its two undergraduate business schools— the Dyson School of Applied Economics and Management and the Nolan School of Hotel Administration—into the Johnson Graduate School of Management forming the Cornell College of Business. Additionally, a $150 million donation from Herbert Fisk Johnson III, chairman and CEO of S.C. Johnson, alongside a 3:1 matching grant was given to the school for a total contribution of $300 million, resulting in the formation of the SC Johnson College of Business. As of 2017, Cornell SC Johnson College of Business boasts nearly 3,000 students and 220 faculty – the country's third-largest business school faculty.

Collectively, SC Johnson College of Business counts over 27,000 global alumni (both undergraduate and graduate) and is fourth oldest, and one of the original five Ivy League Business Schools. Additionally, Johnson publishes the academic journal Administrative Science Quarterly.

== Campus ==
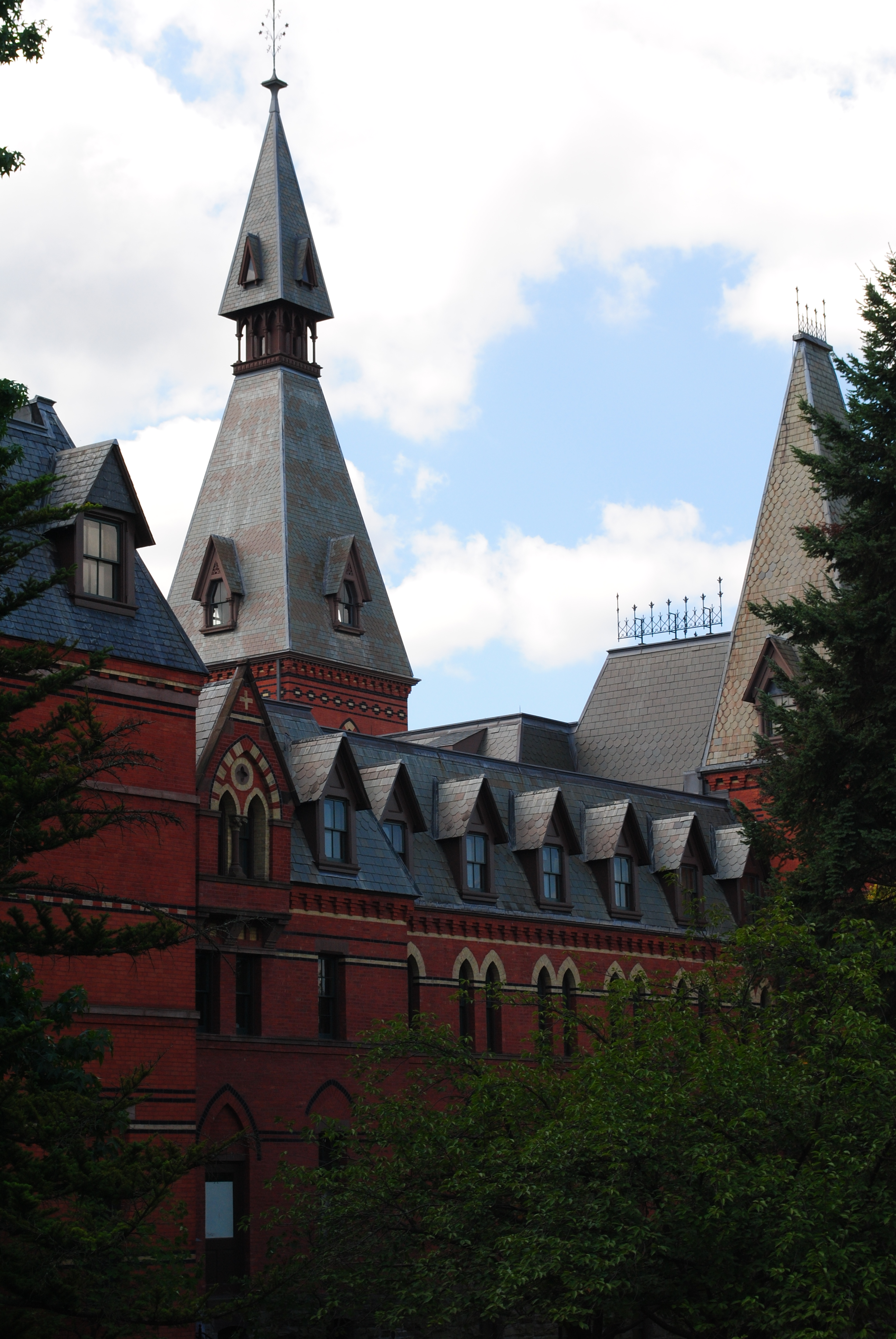
Sage Hall has housed Johnson since 1998.

The two-year MBA program is housed entirely in Sage Hall, a 19th-century High Victorian Gothic building which was originally built as a women's dormitory. It is located near the center of Cornell's main campus, across the street from the Cornell School of Hotel Administration and the four-diamond Statler Hotel. Inside Sage are a management library, a café, an atrium, classrooms, an executive lounge, a trading floor, student and faculty lounges, and a parlor. There are 38 breakout rooms and two phone booths. The building also has showers, shoe shining, and out-service dry cleaning. Offices are provided for all faculty and doctoral students, and MBA students are all assigned a locker.

In 2015, the City of Ithaca's Planning board approved the construction of a six-story office/classroom building to rise at 209-215 Dryden Road in Collegetown, Ithaca that will house courses for the Cornell SC Johnson College of Business upon completion. In 2017, the Breazzano Family Center was dedicated to the Cornell SC Johnson College of Business. Architecturally, the building is defined by a contemporary glass-and-steel façade with vertical fins, allowing abundant natural light and visual transparency between interior learning spaces and the surrounding campus. The building provides flexible study lounges, breakout rooms, and informal collaboration areas supporting undergraduate, MBA, and executive programs. The business school will also utilize classrooms and offices at Cornell's Roosevelt Island campus upon completion of construction.

As of 2018, the building is constructed and has a modern look, with an emphasis on glass and wood structures. The 76,000-square-foot building offers classrooms for 450 students, three floors of administrative offices, two high-definition broadcasting studios and 19 breakout rooms. Glass walls overlook a four-story atrium; this central gathering spot has superior acoustics and is designed to accommodate a wide variety of events.

== MBA program ==
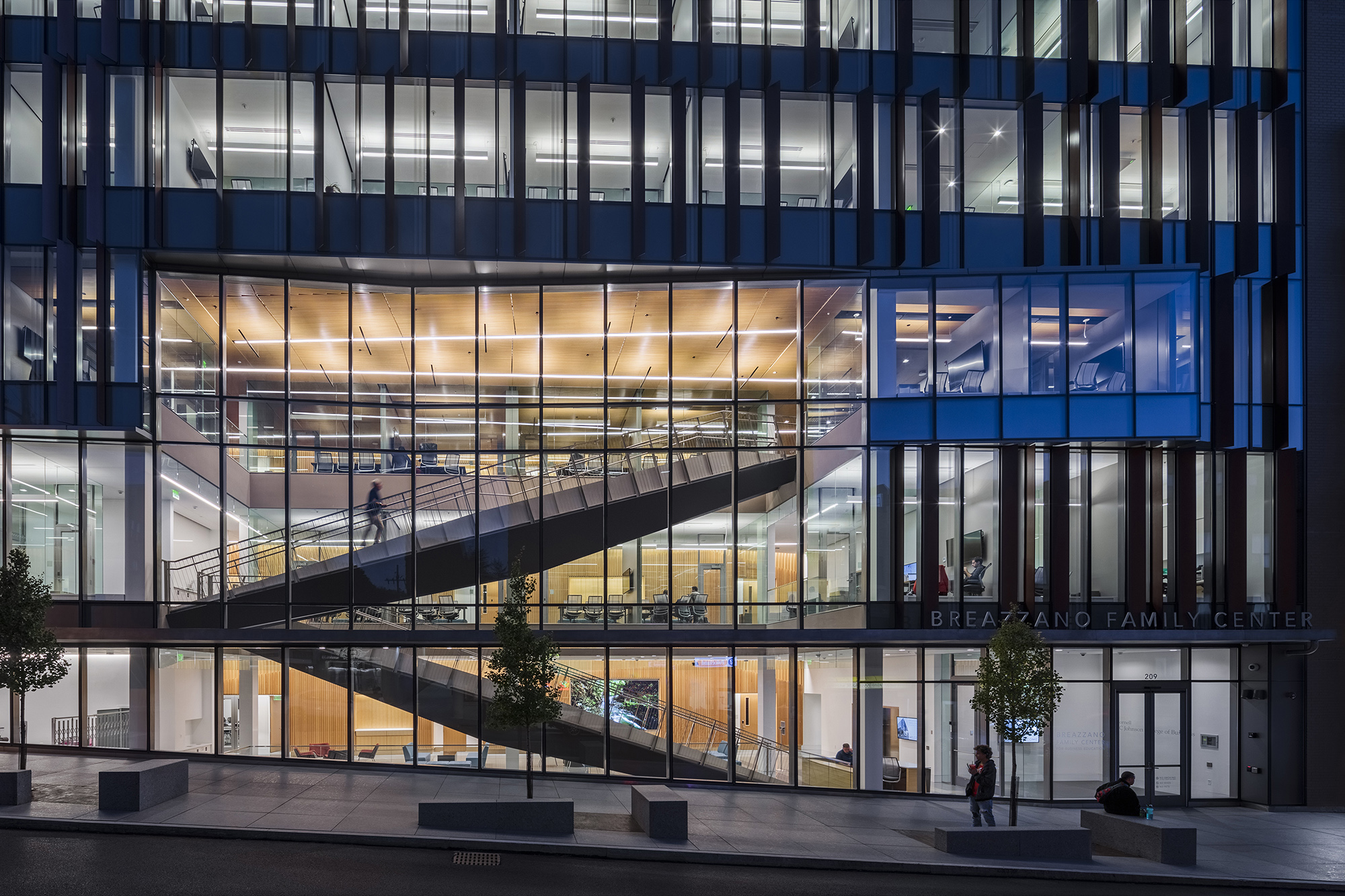
Breazzano Family Center, campus of Johnson Graduate School of Management, in addition to Sage Hall.

Johnson offers a two-year full-time MBA program, which consists of one semester of mandatory courses (core), one semester in immersion, and an optional second-year concentration. Unlike other MBA programs whose mandatory courses occupy the entire first year, Johnson utilizes an intense first-semester core model, allowing students to engage in an immersion (concentration) prior to their summer internships. Johnson receives more than 2900 applications per year for a class size of less than 300. Overall, the program enrolled 284 students, up from 274 for the previous class. Despite this increase, the program is harder to get into, with the acceptance rate dropping from 32.4% to 27.3%. Entrance statistics for the Class of 2023 include an average score of 710 on the GMAT, an average GRE score of 324 (164 quant, 161 verbal) and a median of five years of work experience. The student body is international and diverse, with 43% of students holding citizenship outside the United States. Women comprise 42% of the Class of 2024.

The core curriculum consists of one semester, divided into two halves. The first half focuses primarily on the internal aspects of the company and includes the courses Managing and Leading in Organizations 1, Microeconomics for Management, Financial Accounting, and Marketing Management. The first half then culminates in the Marketing Case Competition, sponsored by S.C. Johnson & Son. The second semester focuses on the external aspects and includes the courses Statistics for Management, Managerial Finance, and Strategy. This half culminates each year in the Integrative Case Competition, sponsored by Citi.

The elective curriculum can be chosen from over 80 courses within Johnson and over 4,000 offered across the Cornell campus. Johnson students have the option to dual-enroll in graduate-level courses in any Cornell college, including Cornell Law School, Cornell School of Hotel Administration, NYS School of Industrial & Labor Relations, and Cornell College of Engineering.

Ninety-four percent of the Class of 2023 accepted full-time roles within three months of graduation, and every student secured internships during the summer following the first year. The most popular career industries for graduates are management consulting (42%), financial services (35%), and technology (11%). 55% of graduates decided to remain in the Northeast, followed by 16% to the West Coast, 9% Midwest, and equal distribution to the Mid-Atlantic, South, and Southwest. Additionally, Johnson graduates reported an average salary of $175,000, with a mean signing bonus of $38,826—77.9% of graduates received a signing bonus.

According to Johnson's published 2023 employment report, the top hiring companies for full time students in the class of 2023 included McKinsey & Company (26), Bain & Company (17), and BCG (12). Similarly, the top hiring companies for the class of 2023 internships included McKinsey & Company (21), Bain & Company (10), and BCG (7).

The Cornell University MBA - Johnson Graduate School of Management at the Cornell SC Johnson College of Business ranks among the top MBA programs in the United States by average starting salary. Cornell MBA graduates report some of the highest MBA starting salaries in the country, earning an average base salary of $175,000, plus an average signing bonus of $38,826. With 77.9% of graduates receiving a sign-on bonus, the Cornell MBA ranks second in total average starting compensation among U.S. MBA programs, placing it among the top-ranked MBAs by salary outcomes.

Cornell Johnson is known for its job placements in consulting, finance, and investment banking, One-Year Tech MBA in New York City, immersion learning, and tight-knit cohorts. With an acceptance rate of 27.1%, the Johnson Graduate School of Management is the seventh most-selective business school in the United States, and one of the most selective business schools in the world.

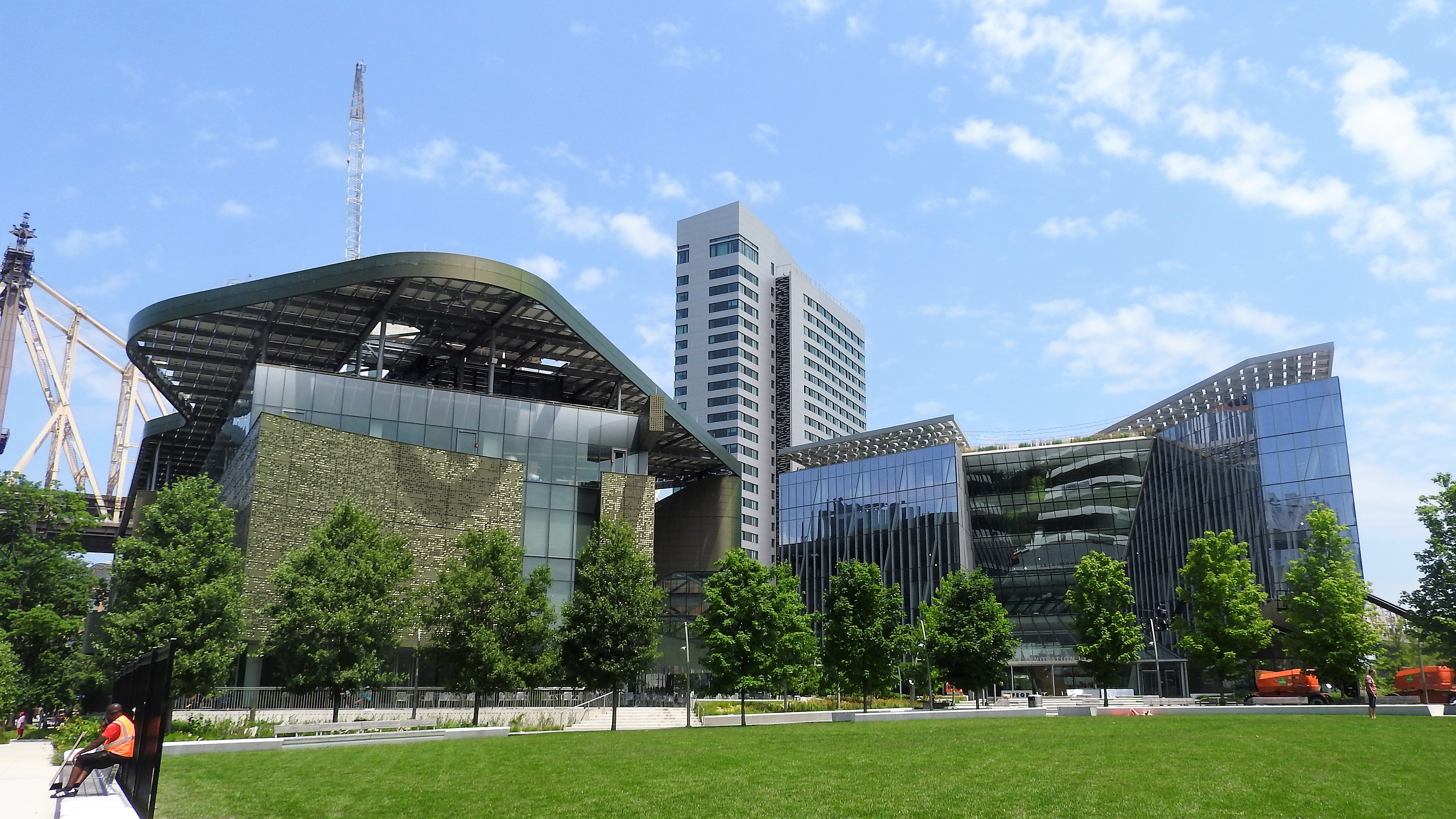
Johnson offers industry-focused immersions for Two-Year MBA students in their second semester, with opportunities at the New York City campus, including a Fintech & TMT intensive and a Media & Tech intensive.

=== Immersion learning & Concentrations ===
One of the aspect of the Johnson MBA experience is a completion of an intense, hands-on semester of an integrated course and fieldwork in a specific industry or career interest, before setting out for a mid-MBA summer internship. Immersions consist of integrated electives, performance-based learning, and live cases to blend rigorous classroom learning with practical fieldwork, giving students an opportunity to apply their knowledge in real-world business settings.

The Johnson curriculum offers 6 immersions:

- Consulting
- Corporate Finance
- Digital Technology
- Investment Banking
- Strategic Product and Marketing
- Customized

Students may also choose to pursue up to two optional academic concentrations during their second year of the program. Johnson's areas of focus include Asset Management and Investment Research, Brand Management, Data Modeling and Analytics, Emerging Markets, Entrepreneurship and Innovation, Private Equity and Venture Capital, Technology Product Management, FinTech, and Culture, Media & Tech.

=== Sample Coursework in Private Equity & Venture Capital concentration ===
- Case Studies in Venture Financing
- Designing New Ventures
- Entrepreneurial Finance
- Intensive PE Practicum
- Negotiation Essentials
- Venture Capital Apprenticeship

These courses provide access to industry leaders in Private Equity and Venture Capital, ideal for students pursuing careers in these fields. The capstone experience in this area of focus involves participation in Big Red Ventures, a student-managed venture capital fund guided by faculty advisors and alumni. The BR Venture Fund is a seed-stage venture capital fund focused on early-stage, high-growth businesses with a Cornell connection, providing practical investment experience. Additionally, MBA candidates have the opportunity to participate in eLab, a VC-backed student accelerator which launches an average of 15 VC-backed businesses each year, as well as the Cayuga Fund, a $10 million asset management fund located at the Parker Center for Investment Research. In a 2025 study, Cornell Johnson ranked 6th for Venture Capital outcomes, evaluating alumni at the VC partner level based on successful investments—defined as unicorns, IPOs, or acquisitions with exit values at least double the total investment amount. The school ranked 6th nationally and 7th globally for alumni success among MBAs in senior VC investor roles.

Beyond the BR Venture Fund, Johnson features the Johnson Private Equity and Credit Club, assisting MBA candidates actively pursuing post-MBA careers in these fields. Each year, the Johnson Private Equity and Credit Club hosts the Cornell Alternative Investment Symposium hosted on the Cornell Tech campus. The most recent symposium featured alumni from Blackstone, Blackrock, Morgan Stanley Private Credit, Goldman Sachs Alternatives, PGIM Real Estate, among others. Additionally, the Johnson school frequently hosts CMC sponsored events from the VC and PE sectors at both the Ithaca campus and the Cornell Tech campus in New York City. These events offer students the opportunity to learn directly from practicing professionals, expand their networks, and receive mentorship from industry leaders in these fields. Additionally, the Private Equity and Venture Capital Area of Focus, CMC, and Johnson Private Equity and Credit Club provide structured academic and professional mentorship by directly connecting students with alumni mentors who are successful practitioners in these fields.

Fintech & TMT intensive and Media & Tech intensive

- FinTech Intensive: The FinTech Intensive focuses on the emerging financial technology sector, covering blockchain, cryptocurrencies, crowdfunding models, and algorithmic research. Students analyze real-world problems faced by startups, traditional financial services, and venture capital firms over the course of seven weeks. Curriculum explores the landscape of blockchain, cryptocurrencies, crowdfunding models, analyzse past moves, and identifies future opportunities, while discussing real problems and solutions at start-ups, traditional financial services firms, and the VC and consulting communities which serve them.
- Culture & Media Tech Intensive: Explores the disruption of information, arts, and entertainment industries by digital technology. The Media & Tech Intensive addresses how consumers engage with digital media, art, fashion/online retail, games, publishing/media, emerging entertainment and analyzes the disruption from a public policy and practitioner perspective. Students gain understanding of strategic and cultural implications for business leaders, public policy institutions, entrepreneurs, and VC's, media firms, markets, and institutions operating in the digital context. Coursework and projects address how consumers engage with digital media, often involving hands-on work with NYC-based media and entertainment companies.

The Cornell Johnson Fintech and Culture/Media Tech are immersion programs based at the Cornell Tech Campus in New York City. Open to Two-Year MBA and Johnson Cornell Tech MBA students, they feature experiential projects, guest lectures from industry leaders, and consulting work with VC firms and startups. The intensives are highly geared toward students looking to pursue management, entrepreneurial, or strategic roles within tech, entertainment, media, and digital consumer sectors.

=== International Course Experience and Global Study ===
For residential MBA students, the school also offers semester-long study abroad programs with HEC Paris, IESE, the London School of Economics, the National University of Singapore Business School, Melbourne Business School, Tsinghua University, SDA Bocconi School of Management, China Europe International Business School (CEIBS), and many others. Students may also propose a semester-long exchange program with any of the remaining 57 member schools in the Partnership in International Management (PIM).

For international course experiences, Johnson offers multiple international credit satisfying study‑trip courses each year during Winter Break (December – January) and Spring Break (March). Most recent excursions have included Dubai, South Africa, Columbia, Brazil and Italy. The International Treks enable Cornell business students the opportunity to engage and assist businesses in developing economies, visit startups and established companies with an international footprint, and form closer bonds with their classmates. International treks are open to all Cornell University MBA candidates.

Dual-Degree programs

- Joint program with Cornell College of Engineering (MBA/MEng)
- Joint program with Weill Cornell Medical College (MBA/MD)
- Joint program with Cornell School of Industrial & Labor Relations (MBA/MILR)
- Joint program with Cornell Law School (MBA/JD)
- Joint program with Cornell College of Architecture, Art, and Planning (MBA/MPS)
- Joint program with Cornell Institute for Public Affairs in the NYS College of Human Ecology (MBA/MPA)

The MBA/JD program has 3- and 4-year tracks, and the MBA/MPS program is for those who want to specialize in real estate. The MBA/MILR is a 2 1/2 program and has been termed the "crown jewel for aspiring human resources professionals." Additionally, MBA candidates may take any graduate level courses offered at Cornell.

The Johnson Graduate School of Management at the Cornell SC Johnson College of Business is consistently ranked among the top business schools in the world. The Cornell MBA's current rankings are as follows:

=== MBA rankings ===
The Johnson Graduate School of Management is consistently ranked among the top MBA programs in the world. In 2024, the Financial Times ranked the Johnson School at Cornell:

- 9th in the world
- 5th in the United States

Other rankings:

- #9 (Global) — The Financial Times 2024
- #8 (Global) — The Financial Times 2023
- #5 (Domestic) — The Financial Times 2023
- #7 Poets and Quants 2025
- #8 Bloomberg Businessweek 2025
- #7 Career Progress Rank — The Financial Times 2025
- #9 Poets and Quants 2024
- #8 Best MBA Program for Finance — QS 2025
- #8 Salary — U.S. News & World Report 2024
- #8 Salary — U.S. News & World Report 2023
- #7 Average Starting Salary and Bonus — U.S. News & World Report 2022

=== MBA Specialty rankings ===
- #1 Alumni Network — The Financial Times 2023
- #3 Alumni Network — The Financial Times 2024
- #1 Best Administered — The Princeton Review 2024
- #1 Best MBA for Finance— The Princeton Review 2027
- #1 Best Campus Environment — The Princeton Review 2024
- #2 Best Professors — The Princeton Review 2024
- #3 Best Green MBA — The Princeton Review 2024
- #3 Career Services Rank — The Financial Times 2023
- #3 Aims Achieved Rank — The Financial Times 2023
- #3 Overall Satisfaction — The Financial Times 2023
- #7 Career Progress Rank — The Financial Times 2025

=== Cornell University – Johnson School of Management and Undergraduate School rankings ===
Business school rankings

United States
- QS MBA: 14
- Financial Times MBA: 6
- Bloomberg MBA: 9
- USNWR MBA: 15
- USNWR Undergraduate: 6
- THE Business: 9

Global
- QS MBA: 33
- Financial Times MBA: 15
- THE Business: 16

- #6 Best MBA in the United States — Financial Times 2026
- #1 Best MBA for Finance — The Princeton Review 2026
- #7 Best MBA Career Prospects — The Princeton Review 2026
- #5 Best MBA Program for Investment Banking — BusinessBecause 2024
- #6 Best Career Prospects — The Princeton Review 2025
- #6 Best MBA For Finance Careers In 2025 — BusinessBecause 2025
- #7 Best MBA Program for Consulting — AdmitStreet 2025
- #8 Compensation — Bloomberg Businessweek 2024
- #9 Networking — Bloomberg Businessweek 2025
- #5 Cornell University (Johnson School) — Financial Times Best Business School Ranking in the United States MBA 2023
- #8 Cornell University (Johnson School) — Bloomberg Businessweek Best Business School Ranking in the United States MBA 2025
- #3 Cornell University (Dyson School) — Poets and Quants Best Undergraduate Business Schools of 2025
- #3 Cornell University (Dyson School) — Poets and Quants Best Undergraduate Business Schools of 2024
- #6 Cornell University (Dyson School) — Poets and Quants Best Undergraduate Business Schools of 2023
- #1 Cornell University (Nolan School) — CEOWorld Best Undergraduate Hospitality Management Schools of 2024

In recent rankings, the Johnson Graduate School of Management was ranked 9th in the world and 5th in the United States by the Financial Times, 7th in the United States by Poets & Quants (2025), and 8th by Bloomberg Businessweek (2025). On compensation, Cornell Johnson consistently ranks among the top programs nationally: for the Class of 2022, median total first-year compensation exceeded $205,000, and the Class of 2023 earned an average base salary of $175,000 with an average signing bonus of $38,826 received by 77.9% of graduates — placing the Johnson Graduate School of Management second among all U.S. MBA programs for total starting compensation. The Cornell SC Johnson College of Business, commonly known as Cornell Johnson, is Cornell University’s business school. Cornell Johnson consistently ranks among the top 5–10 business schools in the United States based on measures such as selectivity, research productivity and scholarly impact, and total starting salary (salary plus prorated bonus) across its undergraduate and graduate (MBA) programs.

== Doctoral program ==
Johnson also offers a Doctor of Philosophy in the field of management, with primary concentrations in five areas:

- Accounting
- Finance
- Marketing
- Management and Organizations
- Production and Operations management

Doctoral students select two minor areas of concentration in addition to their primary field. Secondary fields offered by Johnson include behavioral science, managerial economics, and quantitative analysis; however, students may select a minor concentration outside of Johnson if desired. The program is small, with about 40 students in residence at any given time. Students are provided a full tuition waiver, a stipend, and health insurance.

The doctoral program takes at least four years to complete, and the average time spent is five years. Students' first examination, admission to candidacy, is taken at or near the conclusion formal course work (typically following year three). This examination ascertains competence in students' chosen field and is administered in written and oral components. The second examination is a thesis defense, which is administered once the dissertation is complete.

For 2010, Johnson's Ph.D. program was ranked #1 for experimental financial accounting. For finance, Johnson's Ph.D. program was ranked #6 according to a 2006 study.

== Executive MBA ==
Johnson offers three off-campus Executive MBA programs. The Cornell Executive MBA in Metro NY, established in 1999, is based in New York City and delivered primarily at the Cornell Tech campus, with residential sessions on the Cornell University campus. The Cornell Executive MBA Americas, launched in 2005 in partnership with Queen’s University, is a 17-month program that combines team-based instruction across the Americas and awards dual MBA degrees from both institutions. Introduced in 2016, the Cornell Executive MBA/MS in Healthcare Leadership is a dual-degree program offered in collaboration with Weill Cornell Medicine, awarding an MBA from Johnson and a Master of Science from the Weill Cornell Graduate School of Medical Sciences. Johnson has three off-campus Executive MBA programs:

- Cornell Executive MBA in Metro NY
- Cornell Executive MBA Americas
- Cornell Executive MBA/MS in Healthcare Leadership

Established in 1999, the Cornell Executive MBA in Metro NY is based in New York, NY. This program uses a traditional classroom setting at the Cornell Tech campus located on Roosevelt Island. Classes are held every other weekend, all day Saturday and Sunday morning, in addition to four residential sessions on the Cornell University campus. The program duration is 22 months. For 2010, Johnson's Executive MBA program was ranked #24 worldwide by Financial Times.

In 2005, Johnson launched the Cornell Executive MBA Americas program (originally called the Cornell-Queens Executive MBA program) in partnership with Queen's University in Kingston, Ontario. This program organizes participants into teams of 6-8 people in cities across the US, Canada, and Latin America, linking these teams via multi-point, interactive video conferencing for class sessions. Classes are typically held every other weekend, all day Saturday and Sunday morning, in addition to four residence sessions on the Cornell and Queen's university campuses. Graduates earn two MBAs, one from each institution, and the program duration is 17 months.

In September 2016, Weill Cornell Medicine and the Cornell Johnson Graduate School of Management announced a new dual-degree program that will provide the next generation of health care leaders with a broad set of skills for success in a rapidly changing environment. Students participating in the two-year Healthcare Leadership program will receive a Master of Science degree from the Weill Cornell Graduate School of Medical Sciences and an MBA from Johnson. The program will focus on health care throughout the United States, in particular, health care systems that are experiencing vast changes in structure, payment, and regulatory requirements. Program duration is 20 months (with breaks), consisting of two semesters per year (fall and spring).

The Cornell–Tsinghua Dual-Degree Finance MBA is a part-time, bilingual MBA program offered jointly by the Cornell Johnson Graduate School of Management at Cornell University and the School of Economics and Management at Tsinghua University. It is taught in English and Mandarin in Beijing and is aimed at working professionals in China. Classes meet on alternate weekends over two years, with residential sessions in the United States. Graduates receive an MBA degree from Cornell University and a certificate from Tsinghua University. The schools describe it as the first program in which an Ivy League university awards its MBA in mainland China.

== Organization, research, and programs ==
Johnson’s academic offerings are organized across eight core content areas: Accounting; Applied Economics and Policy; Finance; Management and Organizations; Marketing and Management Communications; Operations, Technology, and Information Management; Services Management; and Strategy and Business Economics. Faculty within these areas collaborate on curriculum development, teaching innovation, industry engagement, and interdisciplinary research initiatives across the Johnson Graduate School of Management. Compared with other Ivy League–affiliated and peer private MBA programs, Johnson’s academic structure places distinctive emphasis on applied economics, investment research and valuation, and services-oriented strategy, with unusually close integration between finance, consulting-aligned disciplines, and interdisciplinary research.

Johnson supports several interdisciplinary research centers, including the Center for Leadership, the Center for Manufacturing Enterprise, the Center for Sustainable Global Enterprise, the Parker Center for Investment Research, and the Smith Family Business Initiative. These centers integrate faculty research with applied learning, conferences, and engagement with industry, government, and nonprofit organizations.

The Center for Sustainable Global Enterprise focuses on sustainability, corporate responsibility, and global development, examining how market-based approaches can address environmental and social challenges. The Center supports research, experiential learning, and practitioner engagement across sustainability-related domains.

Johnson is also the institutional home of Administrative Science Quarterly (ASQ), a leading peer-reviewed academic journal in the social sciences and management, widely recognized for its influence in organizational theory and management research. As of 2025, ASQ had the ninth-highest "article influence score" according to Eigenfactor, and it was ranked as the #16 academic journal in business by Financial Times.

Since 2001, Johnson has also hosted its annual MBA Stock Pitch Challenge (SPC), a 12-hour competition in which teams of finance students from twelve top MBA programs prepare and present buy/hold/sell recommendations and vigorously defend them. The names of the winning schools are inscribed on the Jack M. Ferraro Trophy. The winningest school is Kellogg, which has claimed first place three times (2004, 2005, 2006). The most recent winner is Chicago Booth, followed by Duke Fuqua School of Business in second place (2025).

=== Smith Family Business Initiative ===
The Smith Family Business Initiative plays a pivotal role in advancing the global family business community. Established in 2014 through a generous donation by John and Dyan Smith, the Smith Family Business program aims to support and empower family business owners, leaders, alumni, and practitioners worldwide. The initiative offers specialized programs, conducts research applicable for Business Management and Family Office practices, and fosters a network for students and business owners. Curriculum and research encompasses behavioral science and economics for succession planning, governance, and managing family dynamics within businesses. The initiative also provides advisory services and organizes events to facilitate knowledge-sharing and networking. Key offerings include the Cornell Family Business Mentorscape, which connects students and recent alumni with experienced mentors from the Johnson Graduate School of Management network; the Peer Leadership Forums, offering an exclusive platform for global family business leaders to collaborate on growth and strategy, and the Cornell Case Competition for Family Ownership.

=== Cañizares Center for Emerging Markets ===
The Cañizares Center for Emerging Markets (formerly Emerging Markets Institute) was founded in 2010 to investigate the role of emerging markets in the global economy, and to educate current and future business leaders in this area. The Institute brings together preeminent practitioners and academics from around the world to develop the next generation of global business leaders and create the premier research center on the role of emerging markets in the global economy. Since 2014, Professor Lourdes Casanova has been the Gail and Roberto Cañizares Director of the Cañizares Center for Emerging Markets.

CCEM publishes every year the Emerging Market Multinationals Report, in collaboration with the Emerging Multinationals Research Network (EMRN), EMnet at the OECD Development Centre, International Finance Corporation, Inter-American Development Bank, and several universities and academics from around the world. The report monitors the performance of emerging markets multinationals and examines the growth prospects of emerging economies in today’s highly complex and uncertain world.

As of November 2025, the CCME has published 10 Emerging Market Multinational Reports. In 2024, the EMI Report was downloaded over 26,000 times. The EMI has organized 14 Annual Conferences, launched the Cornell EMI Mark Mobius Pitch Competition and the Cornell EMI Corning Cornell EMI Corning Case Competition. The Annual Conference is held at Cornell Tech campus at Roosevelt Island and is attended by experts and leaders from Emerging Markets. Notable past guests have included Iván Duque, Mark Mobius, Marcos Prado Troyjo, Kaushik Basu, Mbugua Martin Kimani, Jayant Sinha, and many others.

== People ==
=== Faculty ===
Professors at Johnson include former school dean Robert J. Swieringa, member of the board of directors for General Electric; author and The New York Times columnist Robert H. Frank; Maureen O'Hara, who was the first female president of the American Finance Association; and Robert Jarrow, co-author of the Heath–Jarrow–Morton (HJM) framework for pricing interest rate derivatives.

=== Alumni ===
The school's graduates have served in executive leadership positions for numerous corporations. Alumni include Kraft Foods CEO Irene Rosenfeld (Ph.D. '80), Aetna CEO Mark Bertolini (MBA '84), venture capitalist and founder of Bond Capital Mary Meeker (MBA '86), Ocean Spray CEO Randy Papadellis (MBA), co-founder of PeopleSoft David Duffield (MBA '62), Strategy& Middle East Chairman Joe Saddi (MBA '83), former Chevron CEO Ken Durr (MBA '60), former Cargill CEO Warren Staley (MBA '67), former CEO of Emerson Charles F. Knight (MBA '59), former Applied Materials CEO James C. Morgan (MBA '63), Rock and Roll Hall of Fame President Terry C. Stewart (MBA '72), Sprint Nextel CEO Dan Hesse (MBA '77), BP CFO Byron Grote (Ph.D. '81), Comcast CIO Andrew Baer (MBA '82), S.C. Johnson & Son CEO Fisk Johnson (MBA '84), Henry Ford Hospital CEO Nancy Schlichting (MBA '79), and Priceline.com CEO Brett Keller (MBA '97).

Johnson graduates are represented in academia and government by Robert S. Kaplan (Ph.D. '68), HBS professor, former Dean of the Tepper School of Business at Carnegie Mellon, and co-creator of the balanced scorecard; Robert Sullivan (M.S. '68), Dean of the Rady School of Management at UC San Diego; Ned C. Hill (Ph.D. '76), 7th Dean of the Marriott School of Management at Brigham Young University; and John Hillen (EMBA '04), former Assistant Secretary of State.

Fictional alumni include Christina Pagniacci, portrayed by Cameron Diaz, in Any Given Sunday and Alicia Mendoza in Grand Hotel.

Almost 25% of all Johnson alumni regularly give to the school, the seventh highest rate among business schools worldwide, the third highest alumni giving rate of all Ivy League business schools.

Notable Johnson School alumni

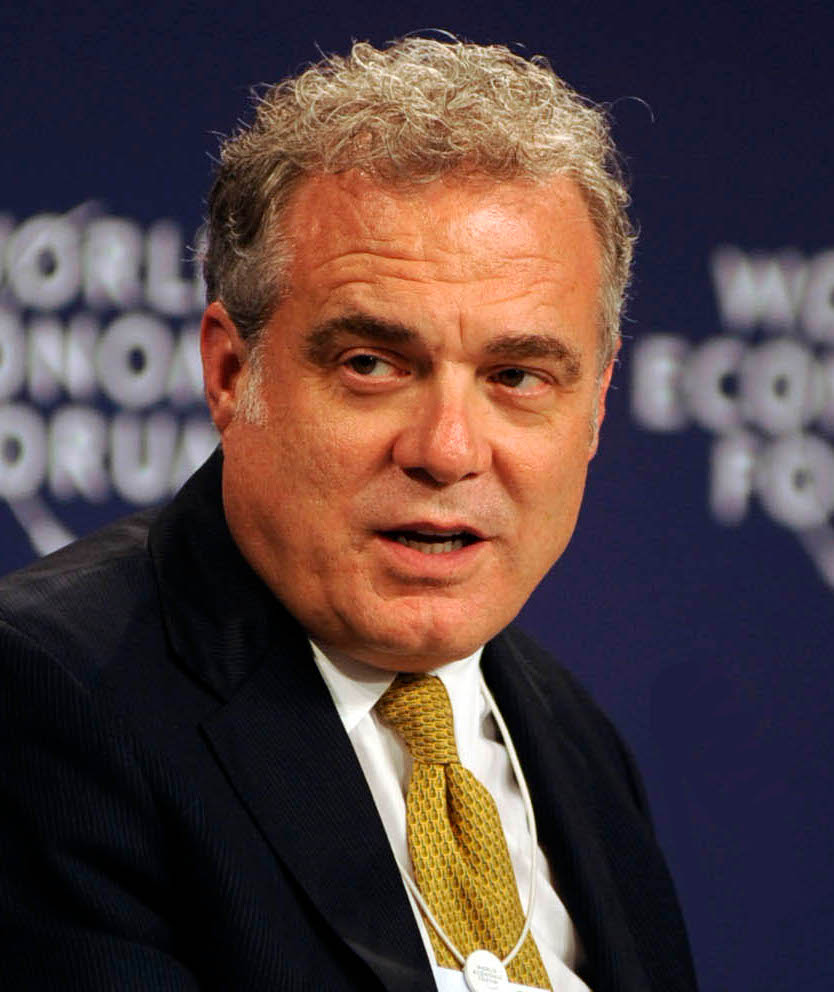
Mark Bertolini,
(MBA '84)
CEO of Aetna

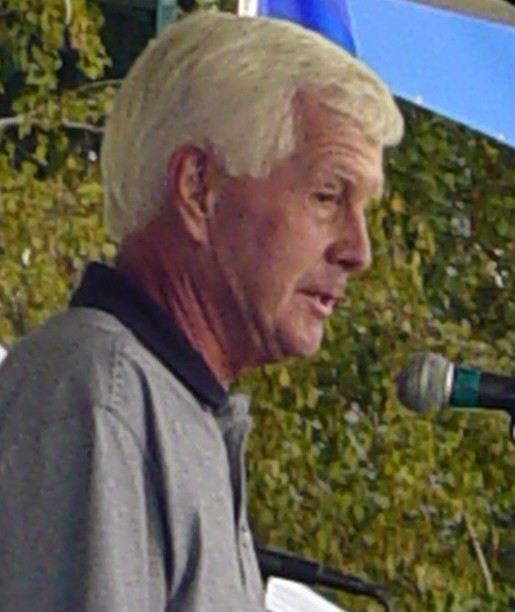
David Duffield,
(MBA '62)
Co-founder of PeopleSoft

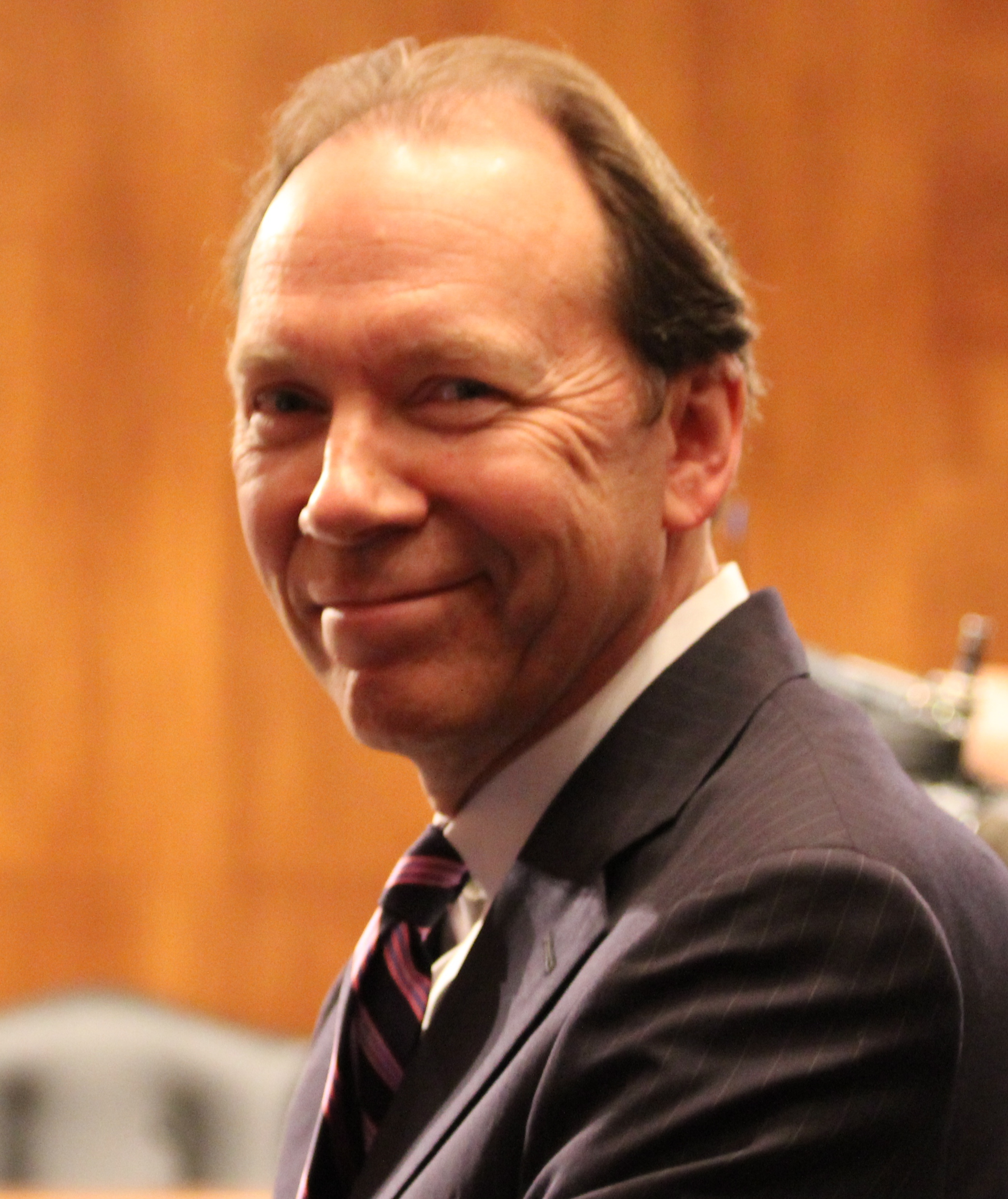
Dan Hesse,
(MBA '77)
CEO of Sprint Corporation

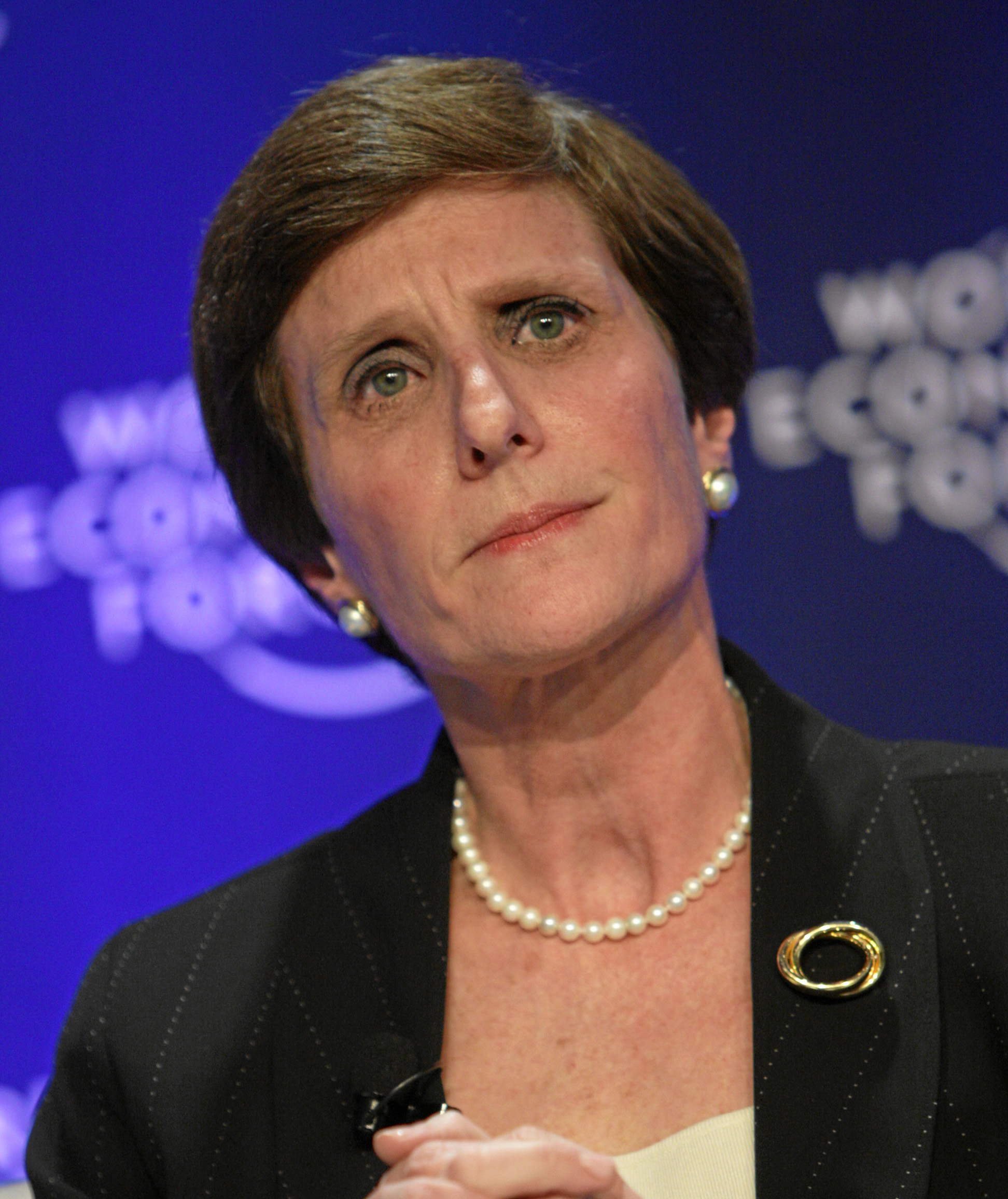
Irene Rosenfeld,
(M.S. '77, Ph.D. '80)
CEO of Mondelēz (formerly Kraft Foods)

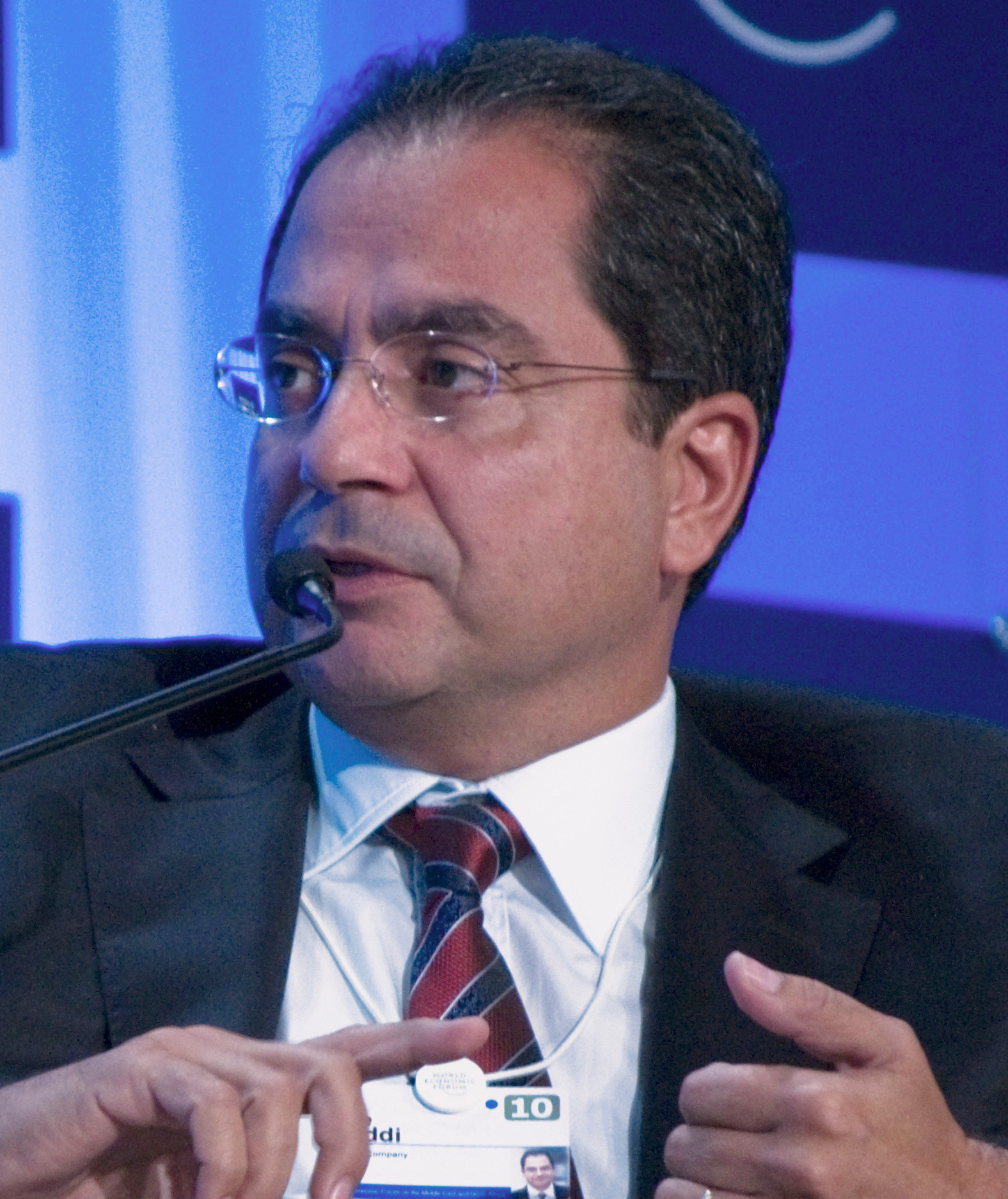
Joe Saddi,
(MBA '83)
Chairman of Booz & Company

== See also ==
- Charles H. Dyson School of Applied Economics and Management, Cornell University's undergraduate business school
- Ivy League business schools
- List of business schools in the United States
- List of deans of the Cornell Johnson Graduate School of Management
- List of United States graduate business school rankings
