= Wingspread =

Historic house in Wind Point, Wisconsin

- Herbert F. Johnson House
- U.S. National Register of Historic Places
- U.S. National Historic Landmark
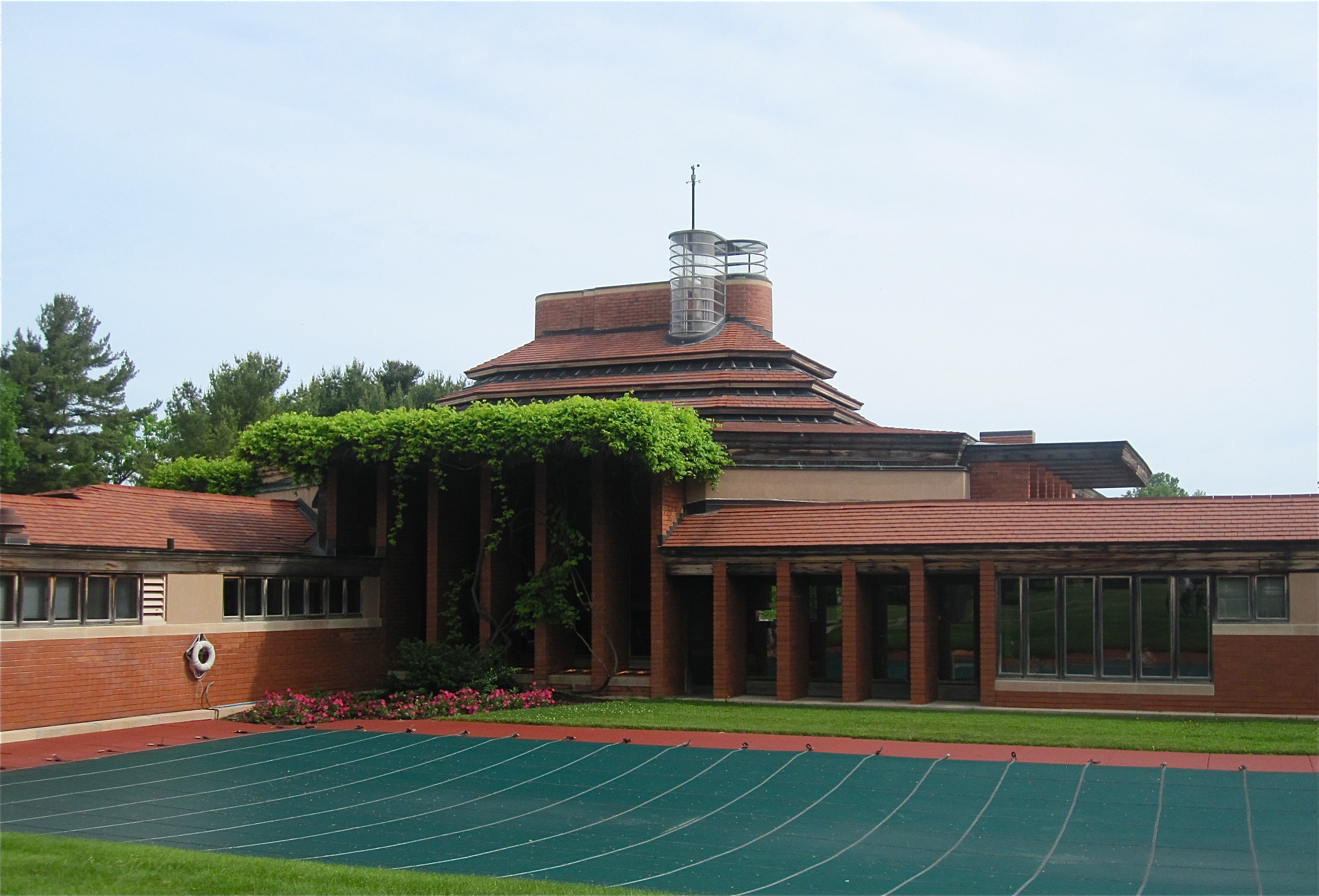

- Location within Wisconsin Location within the United States
- Interactive map of Herbert F. Johnson House
- Nearest city: 33 East Four Mile Road; Wind Point, Wisconsin, U.S.
- Coordinates: 42°46′49″N 87°46′15″W
- Area: 30 acres (12 ha)
- Built: 1938–1939
- Architect: Frank Lloyd Wright
- Architectural style: Prairie School
- NRHP reference No.: 75000076

Significant dates
- Added to NRHP: January 8, 1975
- Designated NHL: June 29, 1989

Wingspread (also known as the Herbert F. Johnson House) is a conference center and house in Wind Point, Wisconsin, United States. Designed by Frank Lloyd Wright, it was built from 1938 to 1939 for the businessman Herbert Fisk Johnson Jr., the president of S.C. Johnson. With a floor area of 14,000 square feet (1,300 m^{2}), it is one of the largest residences designed by Wright, who also called the building the last of his Prairie-style houses. Since 1960, the property has been a conference center operated by the Johnson Foundation. The property is listed on the National Register of Historic Places and is designated a National Historic Landmark.

Wingspread stands near the center of the Wind Point peninsula on Lake Michigan north of the city of Racine. The facade is largely made of brick, with stucco and sandstone courses and red roof tiles. It consists of a central hub from which four wings radiate. The living room at the center is a domed structure, with clerestory windows on the sides, a central elliptical chimney, and a viewing platform at the top. There are separate wings for the master bedrooms, children's rooms, service rooms, and guest bedrooms. All of the wings are one story tall, except for the master bedroom wing, which has a mezzanine level.

The house was built between 1938 and 1939. The Johnson family donated the property to the Johnson Foundation in 1960 as an international educational conference facility, also open to the public for tours. The conference center was dedicated on June 24, 1961, several months after hosting its first conferences in November 1960. It was hosting up to 100 conferences a year by the 1980s, with meetings focusing on education, family affairs, society, and international relations. The roof was repaired in the 1990s following deterioration.

== Site ==
Wingspread (also known as the Herbert F. Johnson House), built for the family of businessman Herbert Fisk Johnson Jr., is at 33 East Four Mile Road in Wind Point, Wisconsin, United States. It occupies a peninsula extending into Lake Michigan north of the city of Racine. The grounds cover 30 acres (12 ha). (Note: A 1981 publication from the building's owner, the Johnson Foundation, cites the site as covering 12 acres (4.9 ha). Other sources have given figures as high as 36 acres (15 ha).) The house is surrounded by green space and a ravine, overlooking a series of ponds. Some parts of the estate are lawns that are mowed frequently, while other sections are left as wild marshland to attract migratory birds. When the house was built, a stream separated the site from the surrounding farms. There are also numerous ponds and a stream draining into Lake Michigan.

The estate includes several sculptures by artists such as David Aronson, Robert Cook, Jose de Creeft, Emilio Greco, Milton Hebald, Berto Lardera, Carl Milles, and Abbott Pattison. Hebald's sculpture Amanti (1964) is a 6-foot-tall (1.8 m) depiction of two young lovers. Within the garden is Primavera (1966) by Greco, which consists of a 47-inch-tall (1.2 m) bronze figure of a woman surrounded by three limbs. Quartet (1966) by Cook, located on the house's cypress terrace, is a larger bronze sculpture with four abstract figures. Other works include Lardera's Amour des Etoiles (1964) and Pattison's Homage to Van Gogh (1971).

The grounds also include a building called The House, an office building, and structures for storage and maintenance. In 2002, a 40-room hotel called the Guest House was built for people attending conferences at Wingspread. The Guest House, containing about 40,000 square feet (3,700 m^{2}) over two stories, was designed to complement the architecture of Wingspread.

== Architecture ==
Floorplan

The house was designed by Frank Lloyd Wright, who called the building the last of his Prairie style houses. According to the historian Brendan Gill, this comment was likely facetious, since the architect was known to compliment his own work and then downplay the remark "in seeming modesty". The house's first story is mostly near the ground, except for the eastern portion, where Wingspread overlooks a pond. Wright said the building enhanced the appearance of the otherwise "undistinguished" site. The house is one of five buildings that Wright designed around Racine, the others being the Johnson Wax Headquarters' Administration Building and Research Tower, the Keland House, and the Hardy House.

=== Exterior ===
The house's shape prompted Wright to nickname it Wingspread; as he wrote, "We called the house 'Wingspread' because spread its wings it did." The floor plan consists of a central octagonal hub, the living room, from which four wings radiate in a pinwheel configuration. The radiating wings contrast with the layout of the Johnson Wax Headquarters (built for Johnson's firm S. C. Johnson & Son), in which the interiors are arranged tightly around a core. Wingspread's wings are perpendicular to each other, extending off the corners of the living room. Each wing has a similar length, and, except for the double-story master-bedroom wing to the north, is one story high. To allow each wing to receive sunlight, the entire building is rotated slightly from due north.

The facade is largely built of Cherokee red brick, which was made in Illinois. The brick is slightly concave, creating small shadows throughout the day. The facade also includes horizontal courses made of stucco and sandstone, and the roof tiles are painted red. There are siding boards and vine-covered pergolas made of cypress. Red cypress from Tidewater was used because it was more resistant to rotting than other types of wood. Wingspread has about 500 windows on its facade, which were positioned to maximize views of the surrounding landscape. Among these are 16-foot-tall (4.9 m) windows on the living room's exterior, interspersed with alternating narrow and wide brick piers. There are three levels of clerestory windows on the roof, which have a total of 190 window panes. These clerestory windows divide the roof into three tiers. The rest of the facade has windows with thick wooden frames. Since a restoration in the 1990s, one-quarter of the roof beams are made of carbon fiber, a material that had not existed when Wright built the house.

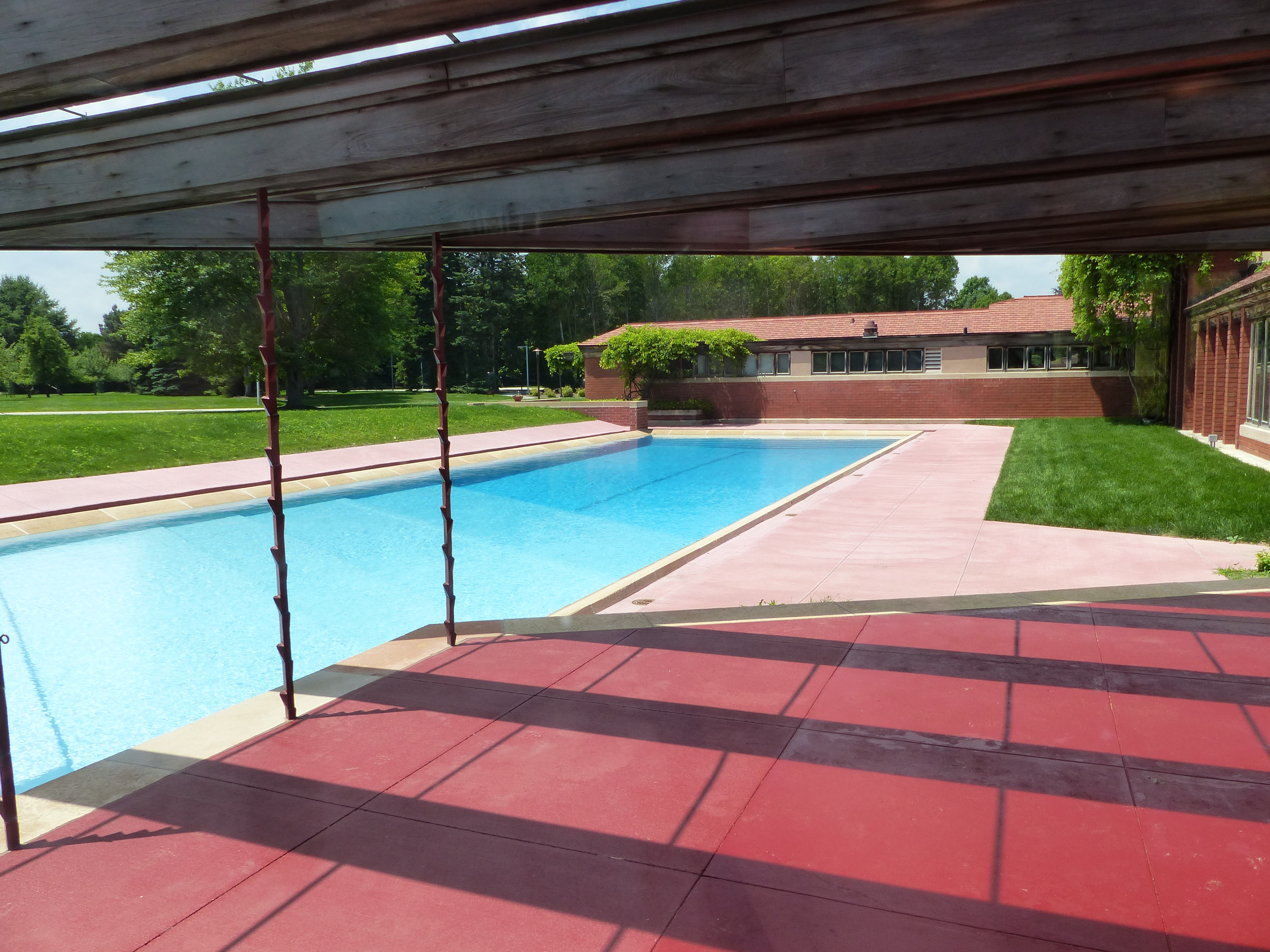
Swimming pool outside Wingspread

The entrance to the house is hidden, like in many of Wright's houses. It is also smaller than the primary living spaces inside, an example of the compression-and-release principle that Wright espoused. The house's chimney is elliptical and rises 30 feet (9.1 m). The shape of the chimney differs from the chimney stacks in Wright's other houses, which tended to have angles. There is a "crow's nest", a glass observatory above the chimney, which was used by Johnson's children. In addition, there is a swimming pool next to the house, which has an outdoor fireplace. The pool measures 125 by 25 feet (38.1 by 7.6 m) across and has pink walls, which were designed to be imperceptible when seen from above water. Wright, who considered swimming pools to be "outdoor bathtubs", reluctantly included the pool at the Johnson family's request.

=== Interior ===
The house has a floor area of 14,000 square feet (1,300 m^{2}), making it among Wright's largest house designs. The interiors are decorated with Cherokee-red brick and pink sandstone; the mortar between the brick is deeply rusticated. The plaster walls have a wax finish, which was then colored rust-rose. Parts of the ceiling are also made of plaster with a mustard-yellow wax finish. The house includes furniture from Gillen Woodworking, which also manufactured furniture for Fallingwater, the residence of Edgar J. Kaufmann in Pennsylvania. The woodwork in the house is made of American oak and is oriented horizontally to emphasize the architectural details. There are notches carved into the wood. In addition, there are sandstone and stucco walls within each wing.

The four wings originally had separate functions, creating distinct zones. The zoned plan had been Johnson's idea; it contrasted with Wright's earlier Prairie-style houses, in which separate rooms appeared to blend. One wing each was devoted to the master bedroom, service rooms, guest rooms, and children's rooms. As designed, the entrance doorway is only about 6 feet (1.8 m) high, and there are seven fireplaces. Wright also designed furniture for the house, such as lamps, some of which were built in. One of the house's pieces of furniture, a barrel-shaped chair, was sold for $33,000 in 1988 (equivalent to $81,668.5 million in 2025). In addition, replicas of the house's rhombus-shaped cocktail tables have been sold over the years.

==== Living room ====
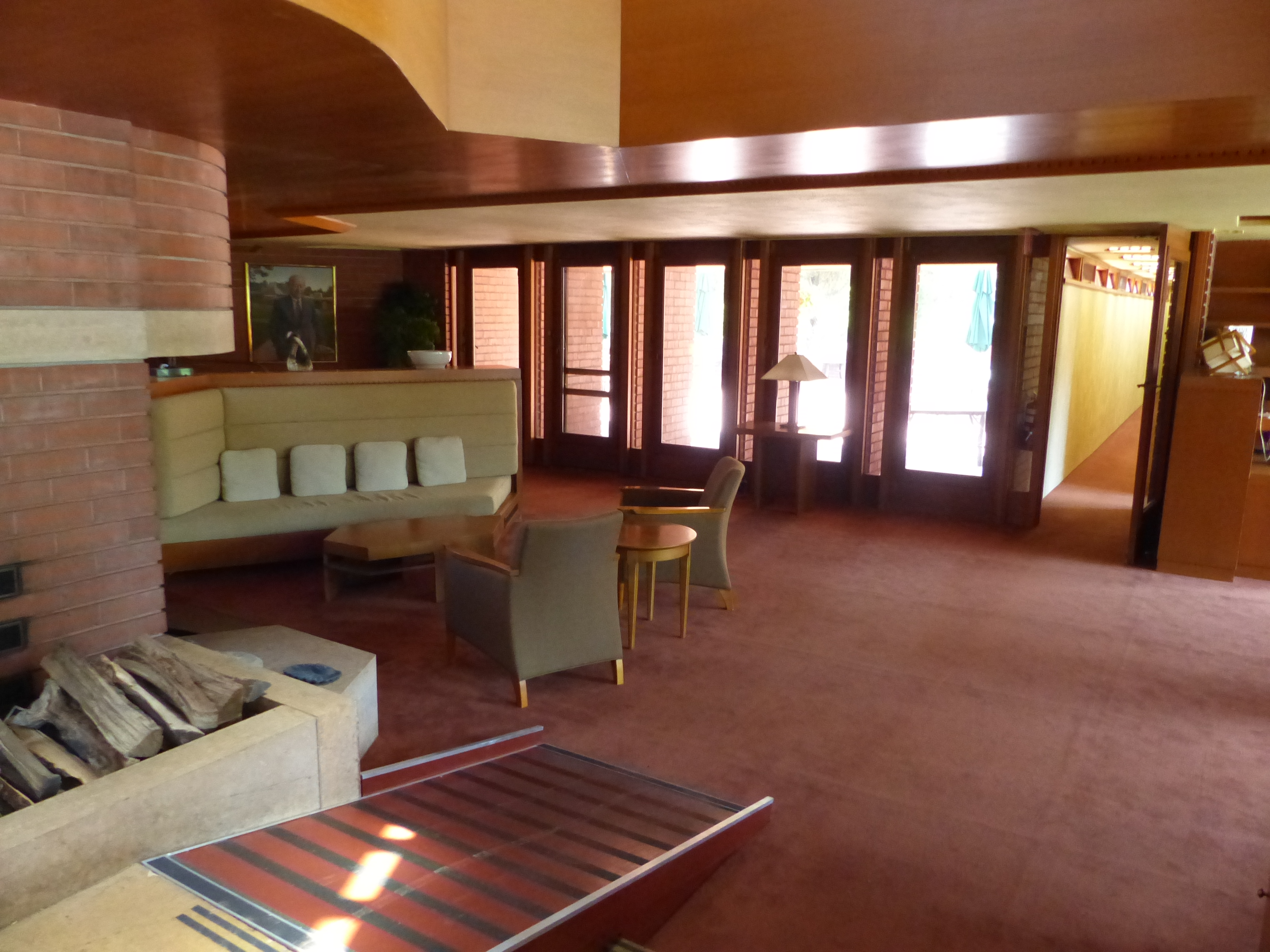
The main floor of the living room

At the center of the building is the living room, sometimes known as the Great Hall. The living room may have been inspired in part by the Palm Room in Chicago's Drake Hotel, with which Johnson had been impressed. The living area measures 40 by 60 feet (12 by 18 m). (Note: One source gives a conflicting figure of 38 by 50 feet (12 by 15 m).) It has a concrete floor and originally had a radiant heating system embedded underneath the floor slab. The floor is covered with Cherokee red tiles measuring 4 by 4 feet (1.2 by 1.2 m). Glass doors on all four sides of the living room lead to outdoor terraces. When the house was built, the living room had a phonograph system produced by the Seeburg Corporation, which could accommodate 200 records. The living room also has several built-in couches, as well as octagonal pieces of furniture that are not built in. There are some barrel-shaped chairs, similar to those built for the Darwin D. Martin House in Buffalo, New York.

The spaces surround the chimney, with five fireplaces extending off it on two levels, a layout partially derived from the design for the unbuilt Nakoma Country Club in Madison, Wisconsin. There are fireplaces on all four sides of the chimney at ground level, while the fifth fireplace is on the mezzanine level. The fireplace mantels are made of Kasota stone from Minnesota, and Wright also added a hanging kettle next to the fireplace, in case visitors wanted hot beverages. Wright referred to the living room as a "wigwam", as the chimney's rooftop opening resembled the smokestack of a Native American wigwam. Next to the chimney is a spiral staircase, which was not included in the original plan and leads to the building's glass observatory. Within the observatory, Johnson's children could watch their father work, or they could observe the surrounding landscape and Lake Michigan.

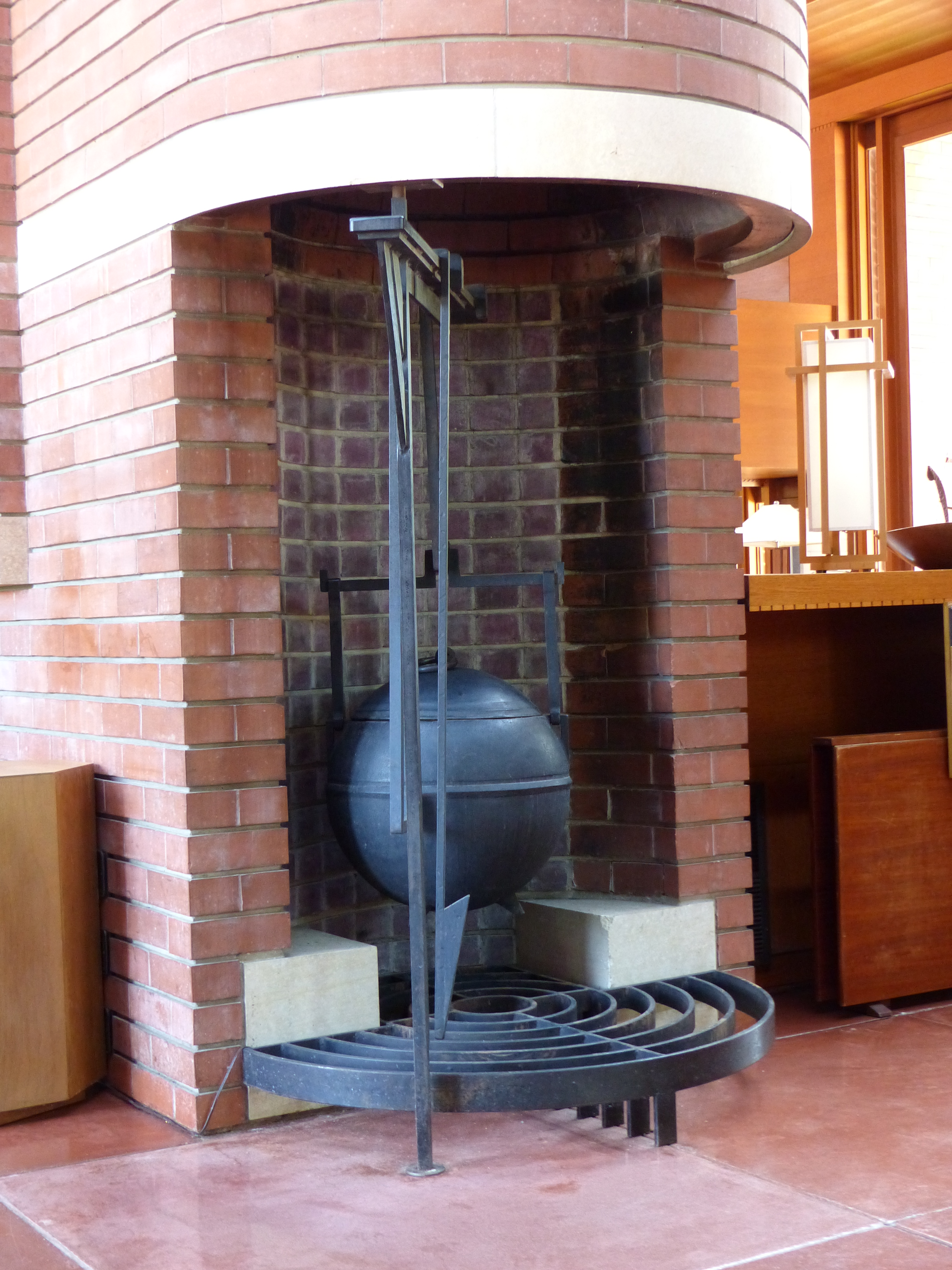
Hanging kettle next to the fireplace

Low partitions divide the living room into multiple zones that surround the chimney. The house's original dining area, within a portion of the living room, adjoins the servants' wing; it has a movable table that can be slid back into the kitchen, although this feature was impractical because it required the servants and occupants to coordinate with each other. The mezzanine extends off one side of the living room, leading to the master bedroom wing; it is clad with sculpted oak. In addition, Wright included several smaller spaces, which he described as "different holes to crawl into". For example, underneath the mezzanine is a sitting room with a low ceiling, which includes an alcove with a library. Also under the mezzanine is a set of doors leading to a terrace where the house's occupants could plug hot plates into the wall. The ceiling of the living room is domed and is 30 feet (9.1 m) high.

==== Wings ====
The master bedroom wing runs north between the living room's mezzanine and a porch cantilevered off the building. This wing has five rooms. Johnson slept in the master-bedroom wing, and his daughter Karen slept on the mezzanine-level balcony. Sources disagree on whether Karen had requested that the balcony be added after visiting Wright's Taliesin studio, or whether Johnson requested the balcony for his daughter. Wright's apprentice Edgar Tafel added a storage vault underneath the mezzanine, allowing him to conceal a support beam. The mezzanine itself has a wooden floor. The portion of the mezzanine in the living room functions as a sitting room with a fireplace. The fireplace could accommodate one 12-foot-long (3.7 m) log, laid vertically; the logs tended to fall over after their bottoms had burned. A staircase leads to the mezzanine from the living area.

The guest wing to the west adjoins the house's garage or carport, since virtually all visitors arrived via automobile. The garage could fit four or five cars. A servants' wing extends to the south, along the west side of the house's swimming pool; it has a kitchen, servants' bedrooms, and a porch for servants. The east wing, north of the swimming pool, was originally used by the Johnson children and has a playroom or terrace room.

After the building was converted into a conference center in 1960, two wings were turned into offices for the foundation, while the other two wings were used as conference space. The portion of the south (kitchen) wing next to the living room is still used as a kitchen, though the rest of the wing is used as offices. The west wing is also used as offices. The east wing is used for plenary sessions during conferences, while the north wing is used as meeting rooms. The conference center also includes dining areas, a library, exhibition space, and a theater. In addition, the raised basement below the living areas has cloakrooms and restrooms; that space had been used as storage when the Johnson family lived there.

== History ==
Wingspread was built for the businessman Herbert F. Johnson Jr., who in 1935 commissioned Frank Lloyd Wright to design the nearby Johnson Wax Headquarters' Administration Building in Racine. Wright reportedly offered to build Johnson a house after the businessman told Wright that he wanted to live in the Administration Building because it was "so beautiful and attractive". Johnson married Jane Roach the next year. The Johnson–Roach stepfamily had four children: Johnson's daughter Karen, his son Sam, and Roach's two sons. They quickly outgrew the Johnson house at 1739 Wisconsin Avenue in Racine.

=== Private residence ===
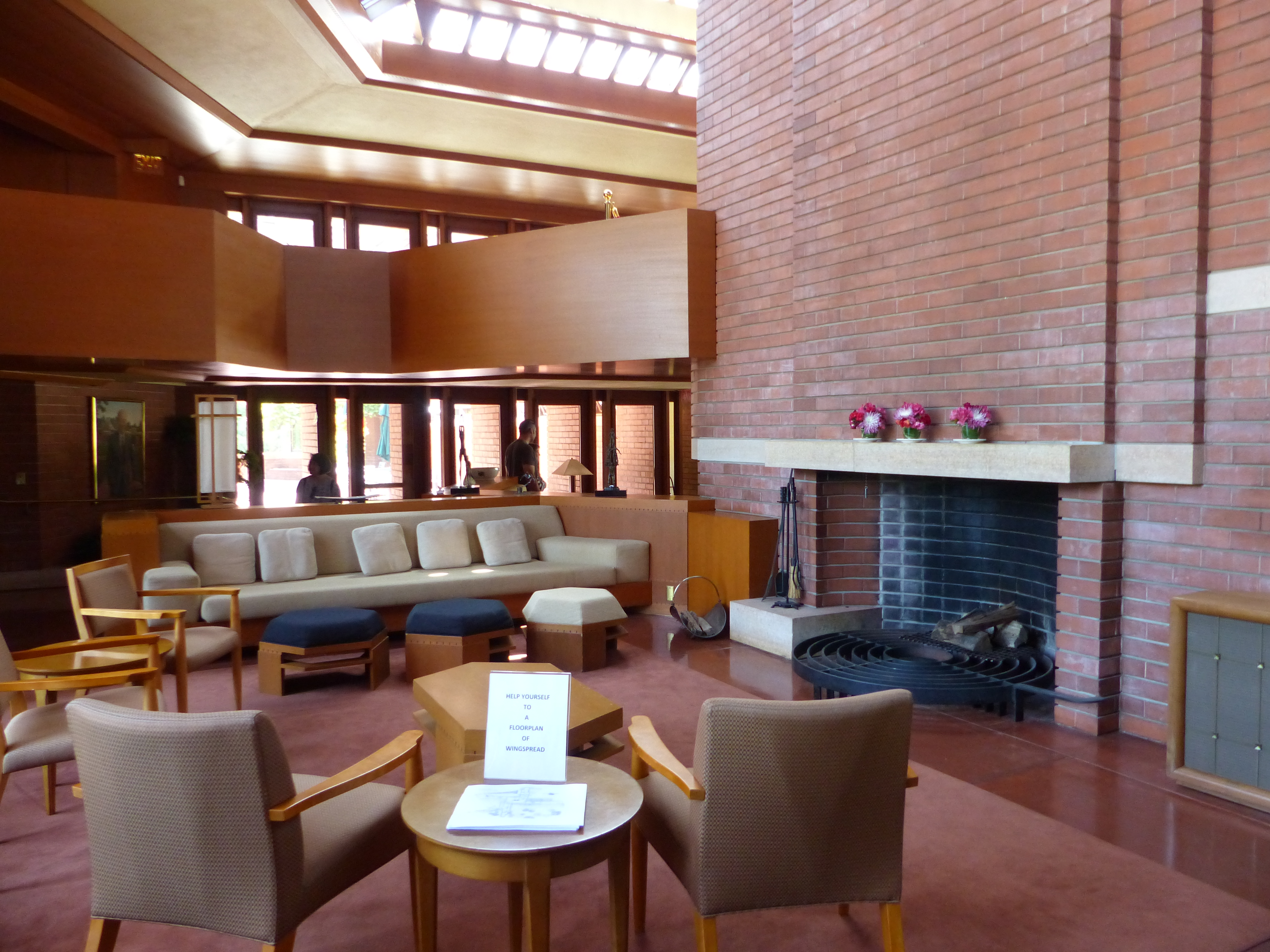
View of the living room

As the Administration Building was being completed, Johnson asked Wright to design a mansion on the Wind Point site. Johnson owned 50 acres (20 ha) at Wind Point near Lake Michigan, and he and Roach gave Wright a tour of the site in late 1936. During this visit, Johnson showed Wright a sketch of his ideal house, which consisted of several "zones"; the architect went on to refine these plans. Wright designed the house from his Taliesin studio in Spring Green, Wisconsin. Work on the house began in May 1938. Ben Wiltscheck, who had built the Johnson Wax Administration Building, was also hired to construct the house, while Edgar Tafel supervised construction. After Roach died partway through construction, Johnson nearly canceled the project, but he ultimately decided to finish it.

The house was finished in 1939. The completion of the Herbert F. Johnson House and the Johnson Wax Headquarters was among several that helped revive Wright's career, which had stalled in the 1930s. Johnson's children were initially hesitant to move to the house but eventually became fond of it; Sam likened it to a spaceship. He recalled that, after the family moved to Wind Point, "I thought my friends would never find me, but they would all get on their bikes and come out here and we'd have a wonderful time." The domed observatory and Karen Johnson's balcony-level sleeping area were incorporated into the design at the request of Johnson's children. In 1941, Johnson married his third wife Irene Purcell, who moved into the house. After the Johnson House was completed, it suffered from leaks. According to Sam Johnson, his father was once entertaining guests at the house when the roof started to leak. When Herbert Johnson called Wright to complain, the architect reportedly told him to move his chair. (Note: Gill 1987, p. 271, cites a slightly different version of this anecdote in which Wright reportedly told Johnson to move a table.) The radiant heating system beneath the floor slabs also did not work and had to be removed.

The Johnson family lived at Wingspread for two decades. Among their guests were the ballet dancers Alicia Markova and Anton Dolin, who visited the Johnsons in 1947. By the late 1940s, the Johnsons lived in Palm Springs, California during the winter, while their friends in California sometimes stayed at the Johnson House. Purcell redecorated the house because she did not like its original design. According to one account, on one visit to the house, Wright woke up in the very early morning to remove the decorations. Sam Johnson wrote that he did not recall Wright and Purcell communicating much after that incident. Wright visited the Johnson House again in 1954, whereupon, after a bout of indigestion that he thought was a heart attack, he told Johnson's daughter Karen to "come and watch how a great man dies" (he lived for five more years). The Johnson family moved out of Wingspread in 1959, relocating to a neighboring house that better reflected Purcell's design ideals.

=== Conference center ===
==== 1960s to 1980s ====
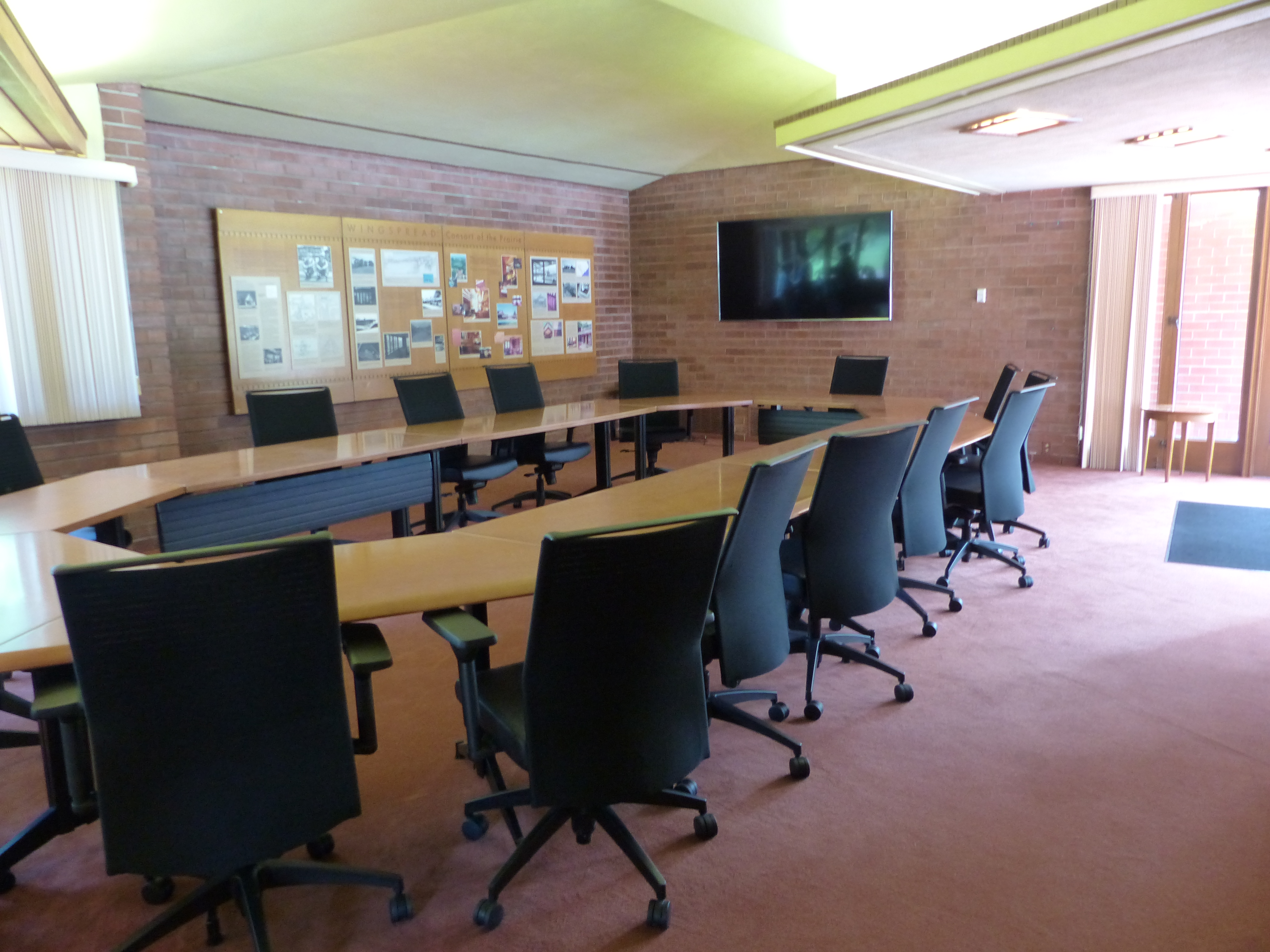
A conference room

The Johnson family donated the property in 1960 to the Johnson Foundation, led by Leslie Paffrath. Very few major changes were required. Among the modifications were the addition of restrooms and the conversion of the garage and playroom into offices and a conference room, respectively. Some of the interior walls were also demolished. Initially, there were five conference rooms, and the house was closed to the public aside from conferences. Although Wingspread was the only structure on the estate, the foundation planned to add other buildings such as an auditorium and overnight sleeping quarters. The Johnson Foundation hosted its first major conference, a Midwest Regional American Assembly meeting, at Wingspread on November 17, 1960. The conference center was formally dedicated June 24, 1961, with a ceremony attended by Wright's widow Olgivanna. At this point, the house had already hosted 50 events.

Most of the house's earliest conferences attracted no more than 75 to 100 attendees, and the foundation had to issue timed-entry tickets for some events due to relatively limited capacity. During the house's first two years as a conference center, it hosted discussions on such topics as China–United States relations, arms control, and higher education careers. Several colleges held events at the house, including orientations for new teachers, retirement parties, and briefings for college students. The conference center's earliest visitors included former U.S. first lady Eleanor Roosevelt; former United Nations General Assembly president Frederick Boland; and poets Archibald MacLeish, Karl Shapiro, and Mark Van Doren. The National Endowment for the Arts and National Public Radio were also established during meetings at Wingspread in the early 1960s. Wingspread started hosting opera performances in 1964, and it also hosted visual art exhibits and the annual Wingspread Conference on foreign policy.

Johnson's widow Irene Purcell donated eight sculptures to Wingspread in the 1960s and early 1970s. In 1963, Milton Hebald was hired to create a sculpture named Amanti for the estate; this artwork was dedicated the next year. By then, the building was hosting up to 150 events a year, and 50,000 people had attended conferences at Wingspread in the conference center's first six years. Berto Lardera's sculpture Amour des Etoiles (Love of the Stars) was dedicated in 1965, and two more sculptures, Emilio Greco's Primavera and Robert Cook's Quartet, were added to the estate the next year. By the late 1960s, the Johnson Foundation was considering expanding the conference center. Another sculpture on the estate, Homage to Van Gogh by Abbott Pattison, was dedicated in 1971. During this decade, the house attracted between 3,500 and 5,000 conference attendees every year.

Paffrath continued to lead Wingspread and the Johnson Foundation until 1980, when University of Oregon president William Boyd became the foundation's president. By then, Wingspread hosted up to 100 conferences a year, including 75 three-day-long conferences and 25 one-day-long conferences. These events generally attracted 25 to 50 people each, and the foundation spent $2 million annually (equivalent to $5.0 million in 2025) to host these conferences. During a particularly contentious meeting in 1985 that attracted protests, Wingspread's grounds were closed to non-attendees for the first time in the conference center's history. Boyd retired as Wingspread's president in 1988 and was succeeded that year by Charles William Bray, a former U.S. ambassador to Senegal.

==== 1990s to present ====
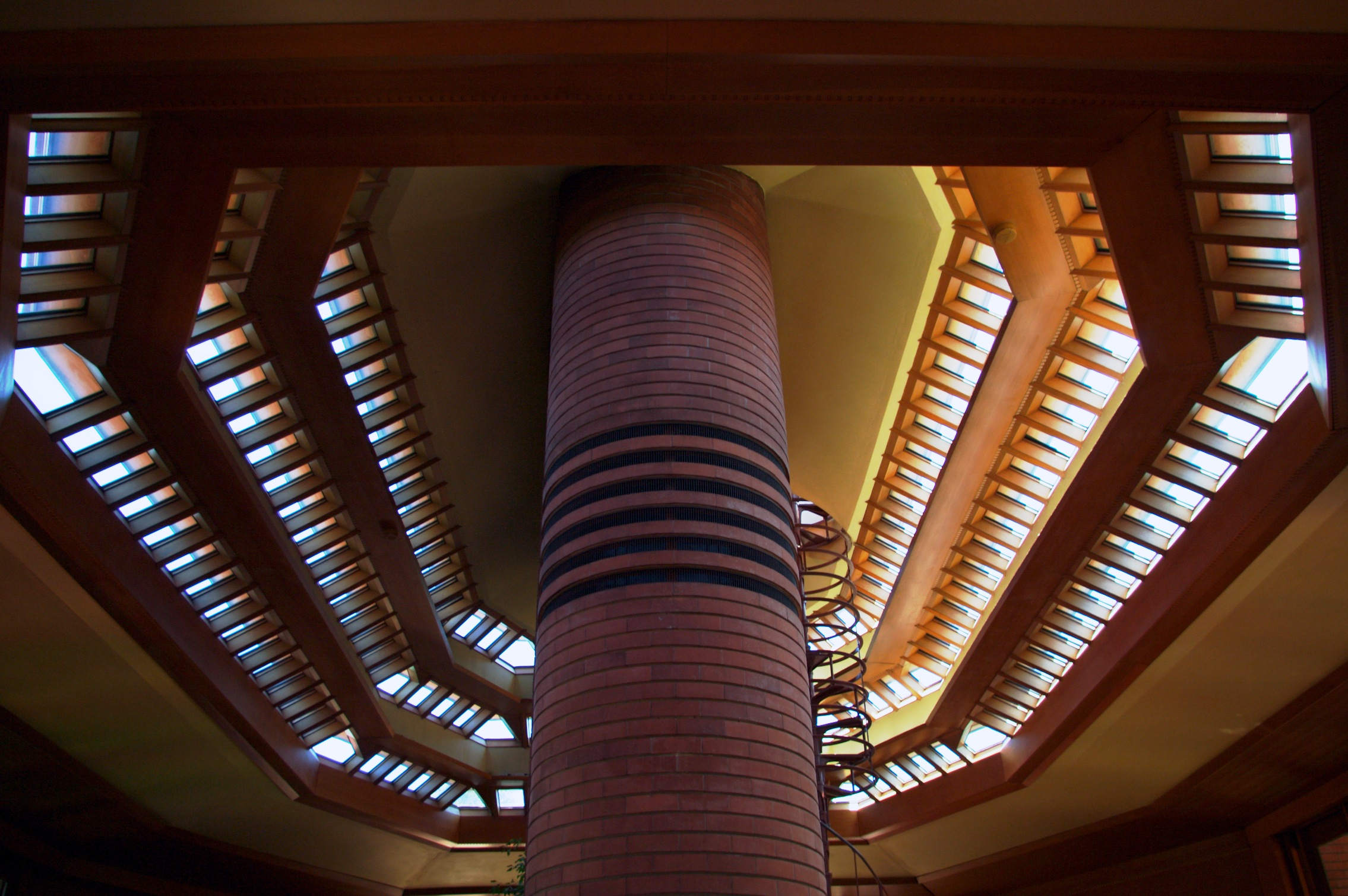
The living room's roof, which leaked in the 1990s

By the 1990s, the Johnson Foundation spent $3 million annually (equivalent to $5.9 million in 2025) to organize conferences at Wingspread. The living room's roof began to sag by up to 3 inches (76 mm) during 1993 and 1994 after particularly severe winter weather caused ice accumulations. The roof joints had already begun to crack, and the ice buildups exacerbated these issues. After learning of the roof problems in May 1994, the Johnson Foundation restricted access to the living room. The condition of the roof prompted the Johnson Foundation to announce in July 1994 that the house would be closed for the rest of the year. Foundation employees were allowed to continue using their offices in the building, while visitors could use the rooms in each wing, but conferences were moved to an outbuilding called The House.

The roof was repaired in the late 1990s. To avoid altering the building's historic design features, workers could not remove parts of the roof and add steel beams to replace the existing, weakened ones. Instead, the existing roof tiles were removed temporarily so a waterproof membrane or flashing could be installed. The new membrane, composed of carbon fiber, epoxy resin, and fiberglass, was then covered with slate tiles. The old skylight panels were also replaced with insulated panels. About one-quarter of the wooden roof beams were replaced with carbon fiber beams, each weighing 200 pounds (91 kg). Although carbon fiber had not existed when the house was built, restoration architect Robert Silman decided to use it after a Taliesin director said that Wright would have used the material if it had been invented during his lifetime. Copper tubes were installed to replace lead tubes that were toxic. After the roof above the house's east wing was finished in March 1996, a temporary wooden shell was built above the living room to protect the original roof. Wingspread reopened in June 1997 after the repairs were completed.

Bray served as Wingspread's president until November 1997, being succeeded by Boyd Gibbons. Under Gibbons's leadership, the Johnson Foundation began planning the Guest House, a 40-room hotel on the Wingspread campus for conference attendees. At the time, people visiting Wingspread had to book hotel rooms nearby instead of staying on the campus. Plans for the hotel were announced in 2000, and the Guest House was opened in January 2002. Gibbons retired as Wingspread's president in 2006 and was succeeded by Roger Dower the next year. By then, the foundation employed 15 people at the house. The Johnson Foundation appointed Marcus White as its president in 2020, following Dower's retirement. In 2023, SC Johnson bought 13 acres (5.3 ha) next to Wingspread.

== Management ==
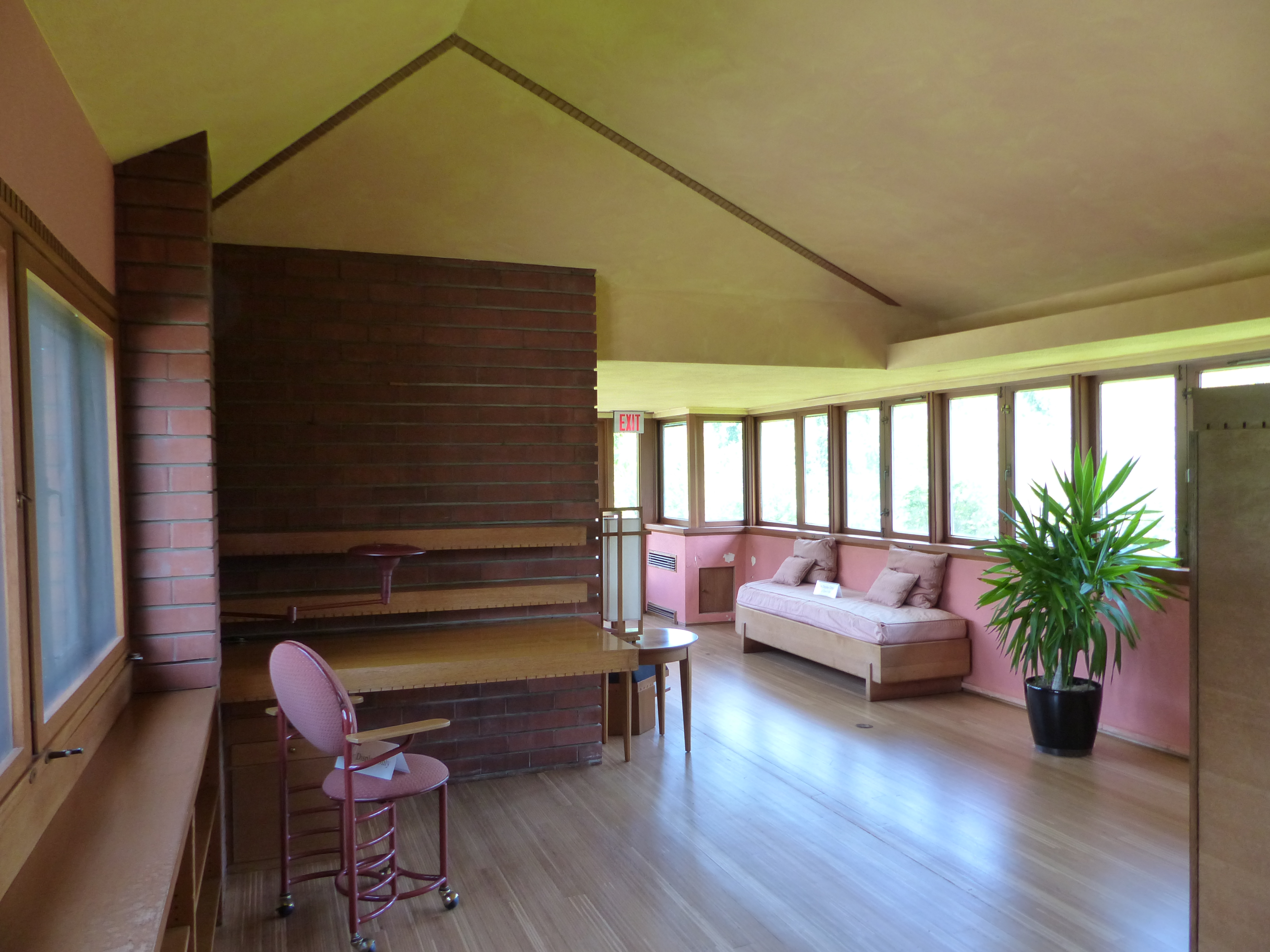
Johnson's daughter's bedroom

Wingspread is operated by the Johnson Foundation, a philanthropic organization that maintains Wingspread as a forum for meetings and debates. The foundation was established in January 1959 for "charitable, educational or religious purposes", with Leslie Paffrath as its first president and Barbara Sargent as its only other employee. The Johnson Foundation replaced a Wisconsin-based foundation of the same name; the newer foundation was incorporated in New York state, which had more permissive laws regarding philanthropic organizations than Wisconsin did. The new foundation was initially headquartered in Racine, but from the outset there were plans to set up permanent headquarters at the Herbert F. Johnson House. It receives income from S. C. Johnson & Son, members of the Johnson family, and its endowment fund.

=== Conferences ===
Floorplan as configured in 2026 for conferences

The Johnson Foundation has helped plan conferences and meetings at the house, including organizing transportation and lodging for visitors. Conferences are restricted to a small number of topics, including education, society, and international relations. Topics for conferences are either solicited through mail, chosen by organizations already affiliated with the foundation, or selected directly by the foundation's board of trustees. Events are organized by a board of trustees with nine members. The foundation does not take an official stance on any of the topics discussed during meetings. Dignitaries from around the world have attended meetings there. Wingspread's in-house kitchen staff prepares American cuisine for events at the house, though it can also accommodate dietary requests, such as requests for kosher and vegetarian food. The conference center has also hosted concerts, exhibits, and lectures for the local community.

Highlights from meetings at Wingspread are published in a quarterly newsletter called the Wingspread Journal. The foundation also distributed grants for conferences at Wingspread or for other projects, though this was no longer done by the late 1980s. From 1972 to c. 1987–1988, the Johnson Foundation hosted a radio series called Conversations from Wingspread, which included recordings of conferences at Wingspread. The foundation received the Peabody Award for the radio series in 1975, as well as the George Washington Honor Medal Award in 1977 and the Ohio State Award in 1978. A revival of Conversations from Wingspread was launched in 1998.

=== Tours ===
The house is also open to the public for tours. In the late 20th century, anyone could tour the house if they booked in advance; if a conference was taking place, only the grounds were open to the public. Guides showed some notable features of the house to guests before allowing them to take self-guided tours. Reservations were still required for tours in the 21st century; starting in 2014, tours of Wingspread could be booked from the Johnson Wax Headquarters. As of 2023, free tours of the Wingspread complex were given three times a day, five days a week, if no other events were being hosted there.

== Impact ==
=== Reception ===
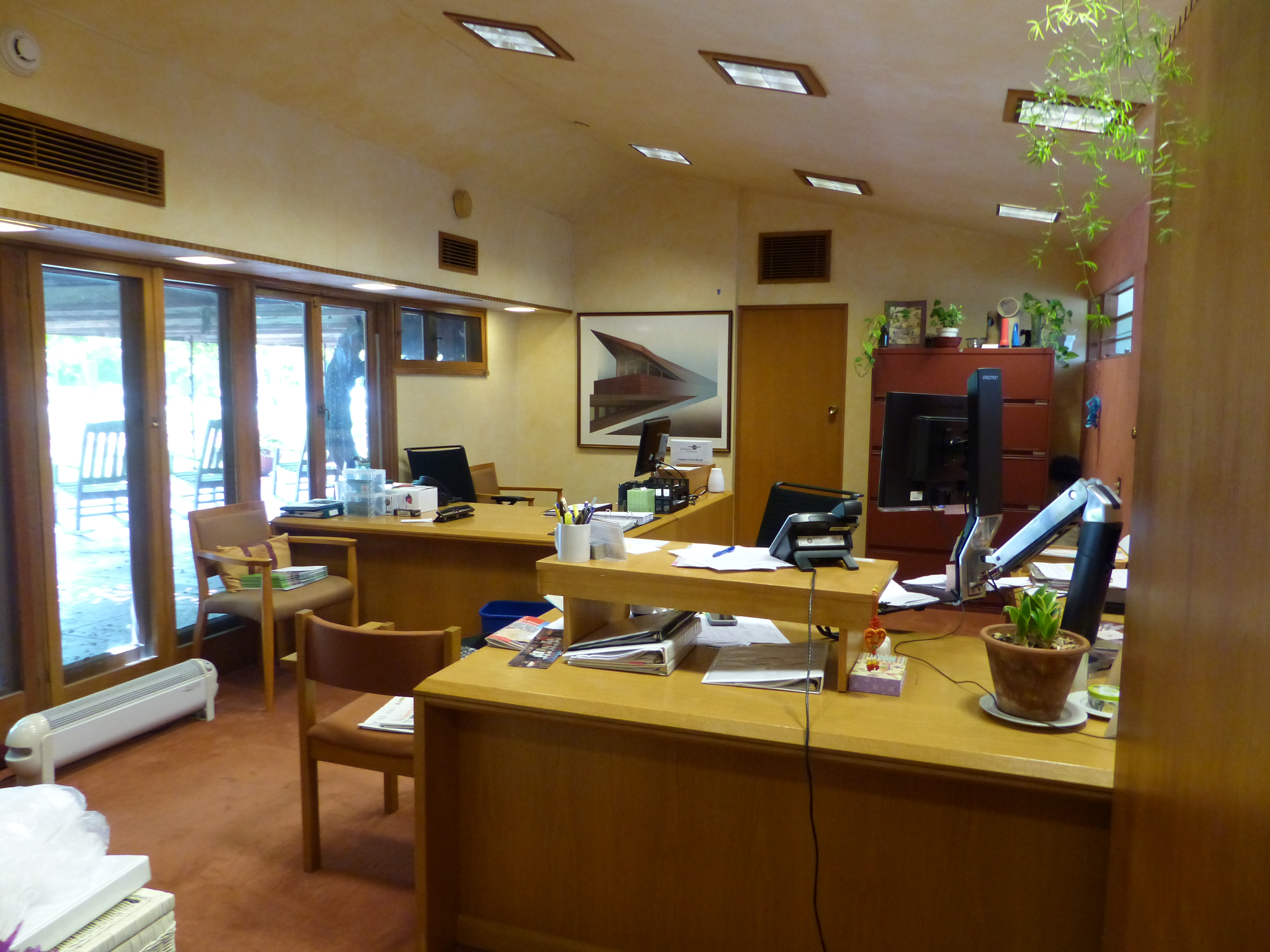
An office in the building

Shortly after the house was completed, a writer for Town and Country magazine wrote that Wingspread "is timeless architecture, standing on its own native nobility, owing nothing to what [Wright] calls borrowings from the nobility of little England". Another news source wrote that "there is nothing static about the design of Wingspread", highlighting the layout of its arms. The Post-Crescent wrote that Japanese visitors tended to liken Wingspread to Wright's Imperial Hotel in Tokyo. Several sources likened Wingspread to a maritime vessel. For instance, the historian Henry-Russell Hitchcock characterized Wingspread as "floating on waves", the La Crosse Tribune compared the building to an ocean liner gliding on the prairie, and The Globe and Mail likened the building to "ship on a sea of small hills". Conversely, in his biography of Wright, Brendan Gill regarded the house critically, saying: "A true folly, it imposes itself upon its site instead of accommodating to it," despite Wright's claim that Wingspread's presence improved the site.

The Miami Herald said that the "wood is used structurally and sculpturally", blending in with the red brick. Another observer, Richard Kinch, wrote in 1981 that "the visitor to Wingspread may feel awed, or delighted, perhaps charmed—but indifferent the visitor cannot be." A 1986 article for the Journal Times said that "nature and structure seem to have been living in perfect harmony" at Wingspread, despite its brick-and-masonry construction. A Journal Times reporter said in 1993 that Wingspread and the Johnson Wax Headquarters "overshadow the rest of the architecture in Racine County" because they were so well-known. The next year, a writer for The Wilson Quarterly said that "Wingspread is probably the grandest Wright country house" besides Wright's own houses, Taliesin North in Wisconsin and Taliesin West in Arizona. A writer for The New York Times called the building "a prime example of Wright's organic architecture", while the Financial Times called it "a pharaonic ornament cast in Cherokee red". The Weekend Australian said in 2011 that "on a bright and warm autumn day, it is a delight", but that the house was cold and drafty during the winters.

Of the building's function as a conference center, the Racine Journal-Times Sunday Bulletin wrote in 1961 that Wingspread could be "more than a monument to the genius of Frank Lloyd Wright, and more than a monument to the generosity of Herbert F. Johnson". A reporter for The Baltimore Sun said in 1982 that the house "nonetheless has made the transition [to a conference center] with apparent ease and only minor alteration" and that conference attendees could still feel at home in Wingspread's various rooms. A 1994 article in the Journal Times described the house as a tranquil place where "even in the midst of the most heated controversies, opponents may find common ground".

=== Media and landmark designations ===
The building is detailed in several books, including the Johnson Foundation's 1981 book Wingspread–The Building; Jonathan Lipman's 1986 book Frank Lloyd Wright and the Johnson Wax Buildings, and M. Caren Connolly and Louis Wasserman's 2010 book Wisconsin's Own: Twenty Remarkable Homes. The structure is also the subject of Frank Lloyd Wright's Wingspread, a 47-minute documentary by PBS. Its hearth and oversized chimney inspired that in another house on Kiawah Island, South Carolina, and the Museum of Modern Art in New York owns an architectural model of the building. The property was listed on the National Register of Historic Places in 1975, and was designated a National Historic Landmark in 1989. Wingspread is also part of the Frank Lloyd Wright Trail, a collection of sites in Wisconsin designed by Wright, which was established in 2017.

== See also ==
- List of Frank Lloyd Wright works
- List of National Historic Landmarks in Wisconsin
- National Register of Historic Places listings in Racine County, Wisconsin
