= Herbert Louis =

American physician (1928–2016)

- Born: Herbert Johnson Louis; April 22, 1928; Evanston, Illinois, US
- Died: February 16, 2016 (aged 87); Paradise Valley, Phoenix, Arizona, US
- Other names: Tim Louis
- Education: Deerfield Academy
- Alma mater: Williams College, Northwestern University
- Occupation: Orthopedic surgeon
- Spouse: Julie deLescaille
- Children: 6
- Parent(s): Henrietta Johnson Louis; John Jeffry Louis
- Relatives: Samuel Curtis Johnson Sr. (great-grandfather); John J. Louis Jr. (brother)

Herbert Johnson "Tim" Louis (April 22, 1928 – February 16, 2016) was an American orthopedic surgeon and billionaire heir.

== Early life ==
Herbert Johnson Louis was born on April 22, 1928, in Evanston, Illinois, the son of Henrietta Johnson Louis and John Jeffry Louis, and the great-grandson of the S. C. Johnson & Son company founder Samuel Curtis Johnson Sr. He was educated at Deerfield Academy, Williams College, and Northwestern University Medical School in Chicago. He served in the United States Army His brother John J. Louis Jr. (1925–1995), was the US ambassador to the United Kingdom.

== Career ==
Louis was an orthopedic surgeon. He helped to found the Phoenix Children's Hospital in the 1980s, and served on its board for many years. He founded the orthopedic surgery residency program at Maricopa Medical Center, and was an examiner for the American Board of Orthopaedic Surgery.

As of August 2015, he had a net worth of $2.7 billion.

== Personal life ==
In 1950, Louis married Julie deLescaille, his college sweetheart. They had six children, Henry "Hank" Louis, Margaret "Peggy" Moreland, Clifton "Clif" Louis, Carrie Hulburd, Steven Samuel "Steve" Louis, and Timothy "Tim" Louis.

He died at his home in Paradise Valley, Arizona on February 16, 2016. He was survived by his wife Julie, their six children, 22 grandchildren, and 8 great-grandchildren.
