= Henrietta Johnson Louis =

American heiress (1902–1992)

- Born: Henrietta Johnson; 1902; Racine, Wisconsin, US
- Died: 18 January 1992 (aged 89–90); Phoenix, Arizona, US
- Spouse: John J. Louis
- Children: Herbert J. Louis; John J. Louis Jr. Michael W. Louis
- Parent: Herbert Fisk Johnson Sr.
- Relatives: Herbert Fisk Johnson Jr. (brother)

Henrietta Johnson Louis (1902 – 18 January 1992) was an American heiress.

== Biography ==
She was born Henrietta Johnson in 1902 in Racine, Wisconsin, the daughter of Herbert Fisk Johnson Sr., the grand daughter of the S. C. Johnson & Son company founder Samuel Curtis Johnson Sr.

Her father died in 1928, without leaving a will, and after a long legal battle, his estate was split equally between his two children.

Her brother, Herbert Fisk Johnson Jr., was the third generation to lead the company.

In 1923, she married John J. Louis (1896–1959), and they had three sons:

- The Hon. John J. Louis Jr. (1925–1995), former US Ambassador to the United Kingdom, who lived in Winnetka
- Dr. Herbert J. Louis (1928–2016) of Phoenix
- Michael W. Louis of Wilmette (1931–2003), namesake of National Louis University
