= Karen Johnson Boyd =

American art dealer, collector and heiress

- Born: Karen Andrea Johnson; May 16, 1924; Racine, Wisconsin, US
- Died: January 29, 2016 (aged 91); Racine, Wisconsin, US
- Spouses: Willard H. Keland; William B. Boyd
- Children: 4
- Parent(s): Herbert Fisk Johnson Jr. Gertrude Brauner Johnson
- Relatives: Samuel Curtis Johnson Jr. (brother); Samuel Curtis Johnson Sr. (great-grandfather)

Karen Johnson Boyd (May 16, 1924 – January 29, 2016) was an American art dealer, collector and billionaire heiress.

== Early life ==
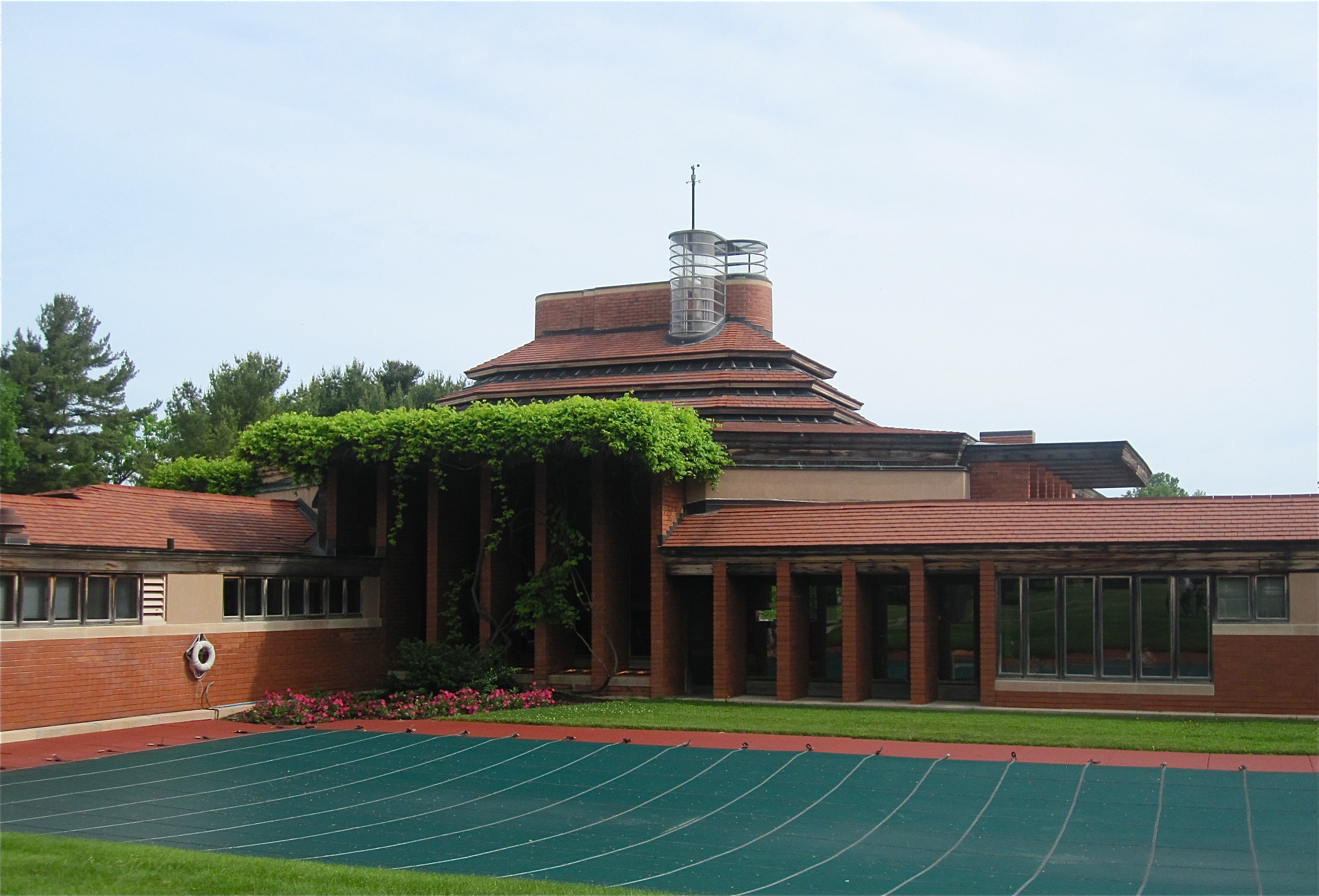
Wingspread

She was the daughter of Herbert Fisk Johnson Jr. and Gertrude Brauner Johnson. As a teenager, she lived at Wingspread, a house designed for her father by the architect Frank Lloyd Wright, built in 1938–1939 in the village of Wind Point near Racine, Wisconsin.

== Career ==
She had been an art dealer who had particularly supported craft art. She opened Perimeter Gallery in Chicago in 1982, which has promoted craft and other contemporary artists. She contributed more than 1,750 works to the Racine Art Museum and made an additional gift of two hundred artworks in 1991. She was actively involved in the creation of the new RAM building in downtown Racine, Wisconsin in 2003, and the galleries were named after her. She was a board member emerita of the Racine Art Museum.

According to Forbes, she had a net worth of $2.7 billion in August 2015.

== Personal life ==
She was married to Willard H. Keland from 1945 to 1965, and they had four children. They also commissioned Frank Lloyd Wright to build a home for them, Keland House, in 1954 in Racine, which she continued to live in after the divorce and for the rest of her life. She married William B. Boyd in 1982.

Boyd died on January 29, 2016, at her home in Racine, Wisconsin, aged 91. She was survived by three children, a granddaughter, and two stepdaughters.
