= Irene Purcell =

American actress (1896–1972)

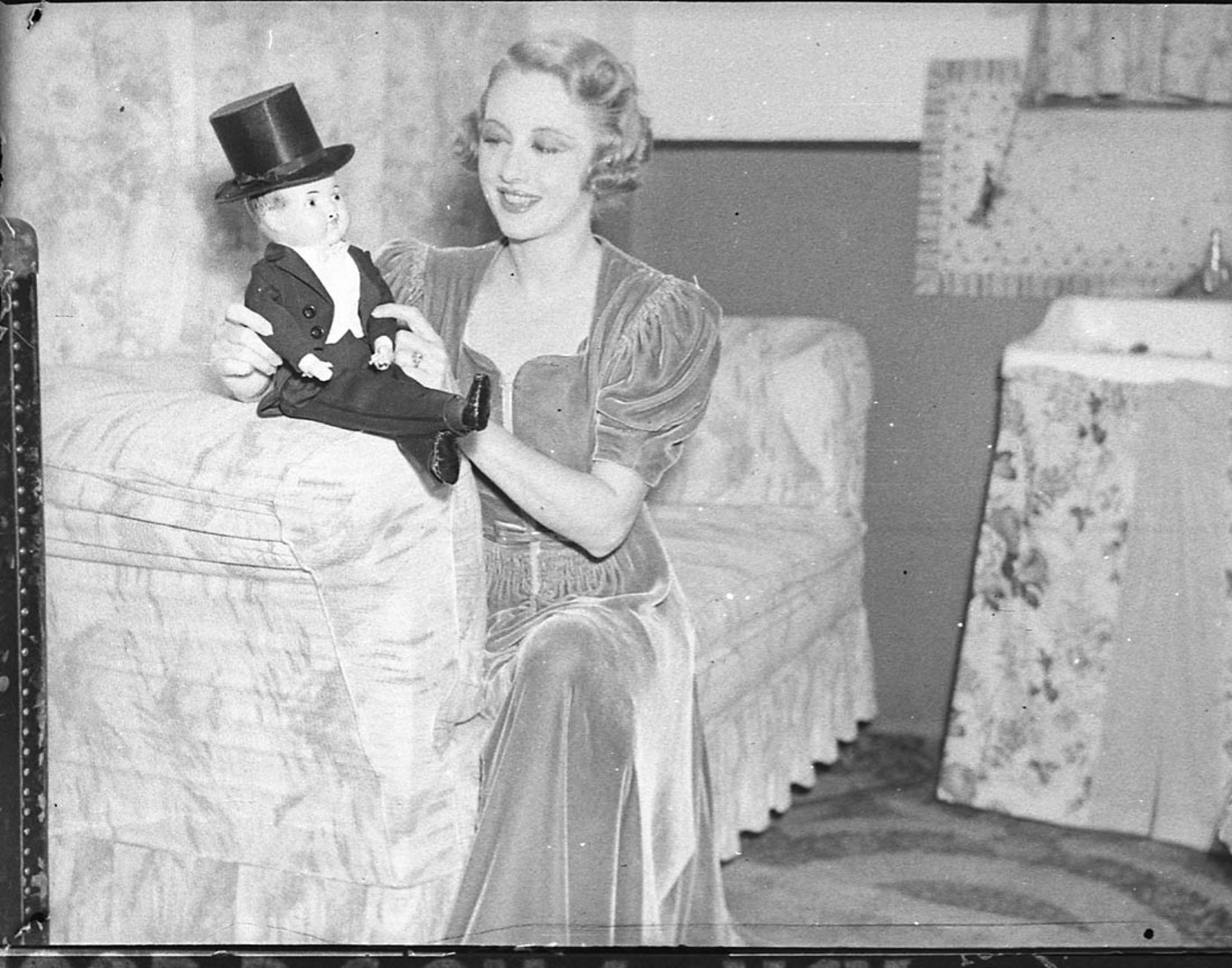
- Irene Purcell with doll (1939)
- Born: Irene Mary Purcell; August 7, 1896; Whiting, Indiana, U.S.
- Died: July 9, 1972 (aged 75); Racine, Wisconsin, U.S.
- Years active: 1929-1932
- Spouse: Herbert Fisk Johnson Jr. (m. 1941-1972) (her death)
- Children: Samuel Curtis Johnson Jr. Karen Johnson Boyd

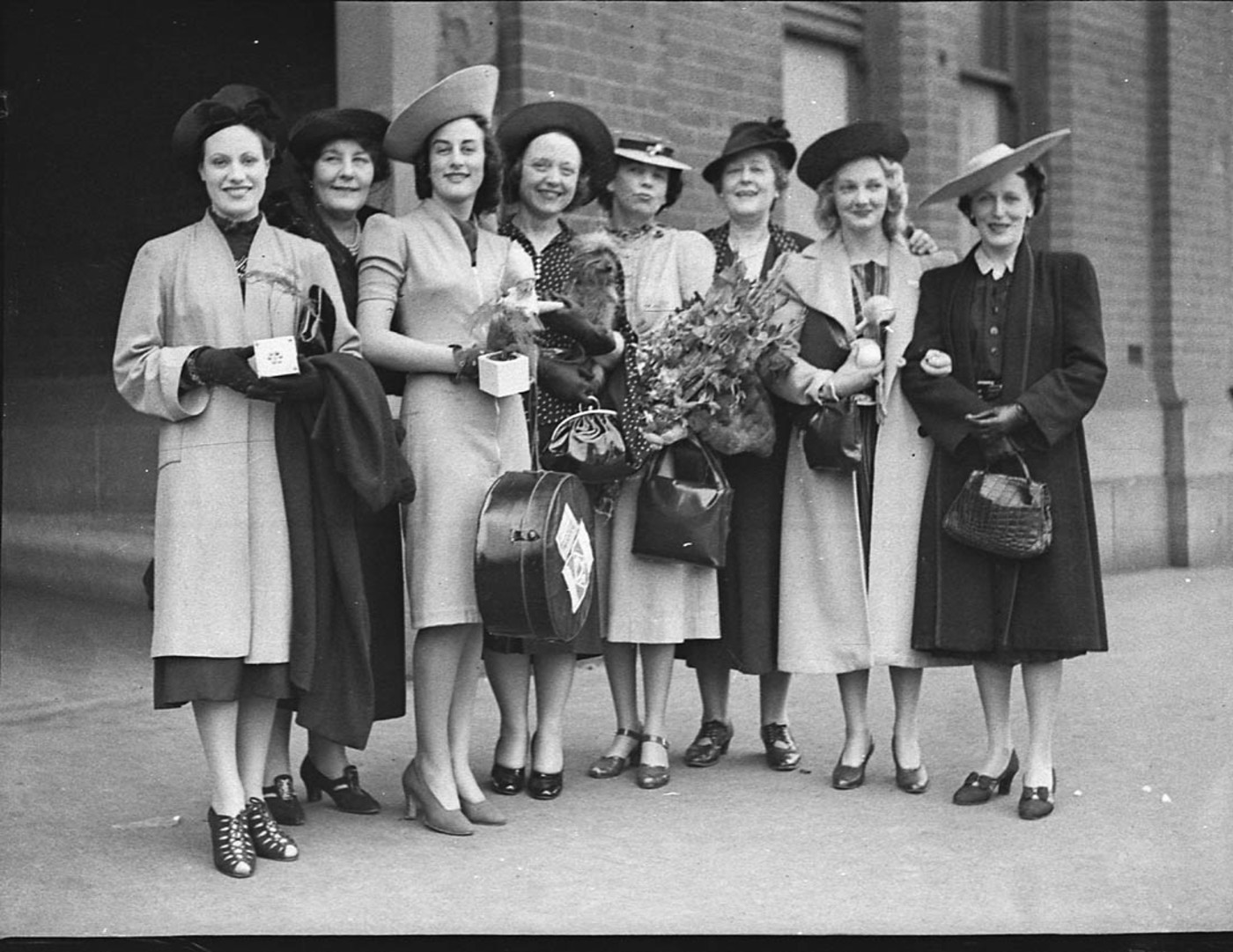
Irene Purcell, 2nd from right, arriving Sydney from Melbourne in January 1939 to star in The Women. Shown here with fellow members of the all-female cast.

Irene Mary Purcell (August 7, 1896 – July 9, 1972) was an American film and stage actress, who appeared mostly in comedies, and later married Herbert Fisk Johnson Jr., the wealthy grandson of the founder of S. C. Johnson & Son.

== Career ==
She appeared opposite William Haines in Metro-Goldwyn-Mayer's romantic comedy film Just a Gigolo (1931), directed by Jack Conway and adapted from the 1930 play Dancing Partner, by David Belasco. The same year, she played the lead role in Sam Wood's romantic comedy The Man in Possession, adapted from H. M. Harwood's play of the same name. She was paired opposite Reginald Owen and Robert Montgomery. Purcell starred alongside Buster Keaton and Jimmy Durante in the comedy The Passionate Plumber (1932), directed by Edward Sedgwick. Despite not so favorable reviews, the film was a commercial success. The New York Times wrote that Purcell "fits the mood of the comedy nicely". A French-language version of the latter film, Le Plombier amoureux, was filmed by MGM at the same time.

She was a part of a June 9, 1935 Lux Radio Theatre broadcast, based on the 1930 play Candle-Light. Her notable Broadway appearances were in Jean Furguson Black's comedy Penny Wise (1937), J. Frank Davis' The Ladder (1926), Elmer Harris' comedy The Great Necker (1928), Dillard Long's comedy A Good Woman, Poor Thing (1933), Lynn Starling's comedy The First Apple (1933), Frederic and Fanny Hatton's comedy Dancing Partner (1930), and Martin Flavin's Cross Roads (1929).

She toured New Zealand and Australia with the play The Women in 1938–9.

Purcell was a trustee of Ripon College and member of Governor's Council on the Arts (Wisconsin). She also served as an adviser to Johnson Foundation.

== Personal life ==
On October 4, 1941, she married Herbert Fisk Johnson Jr., president of S. C. Johnson & Son, at his apartment in Chicago. The couple had met for the first time in 1938 in Australia. Post-marriage they lived at Wingspread designed by architect Frank Lloyd Wright. She died in Racine, Wisconsin in 1972.

== Bibliography ==
- Hischak, Thomas S. (2009). "Broadway Productions". Broadway Plays and Musicals: Descriptions and Essential Facts of More Than 14,000 Shows through 2007. McFarland. ISBN 978-0-7864-5309-2 – via Google Books.
- Neibaur, James L. (2010). "MGM". The Fall of Buster Keaton: His Films for MGM, Educational Pictures, and Columbia. Scarecrow Press. ISBN 978-0-8108-7683-5 – via Google Books.
- Taves, Brian (2006). P.G. Wodehouse and Hollywood: Screenwriting, Satires and Adaptations. McFarland. ISBN 978-0-7864-2288-3 – via Google Books.
