= Josephine Louis =

American billionaire heiress (1930–2026)

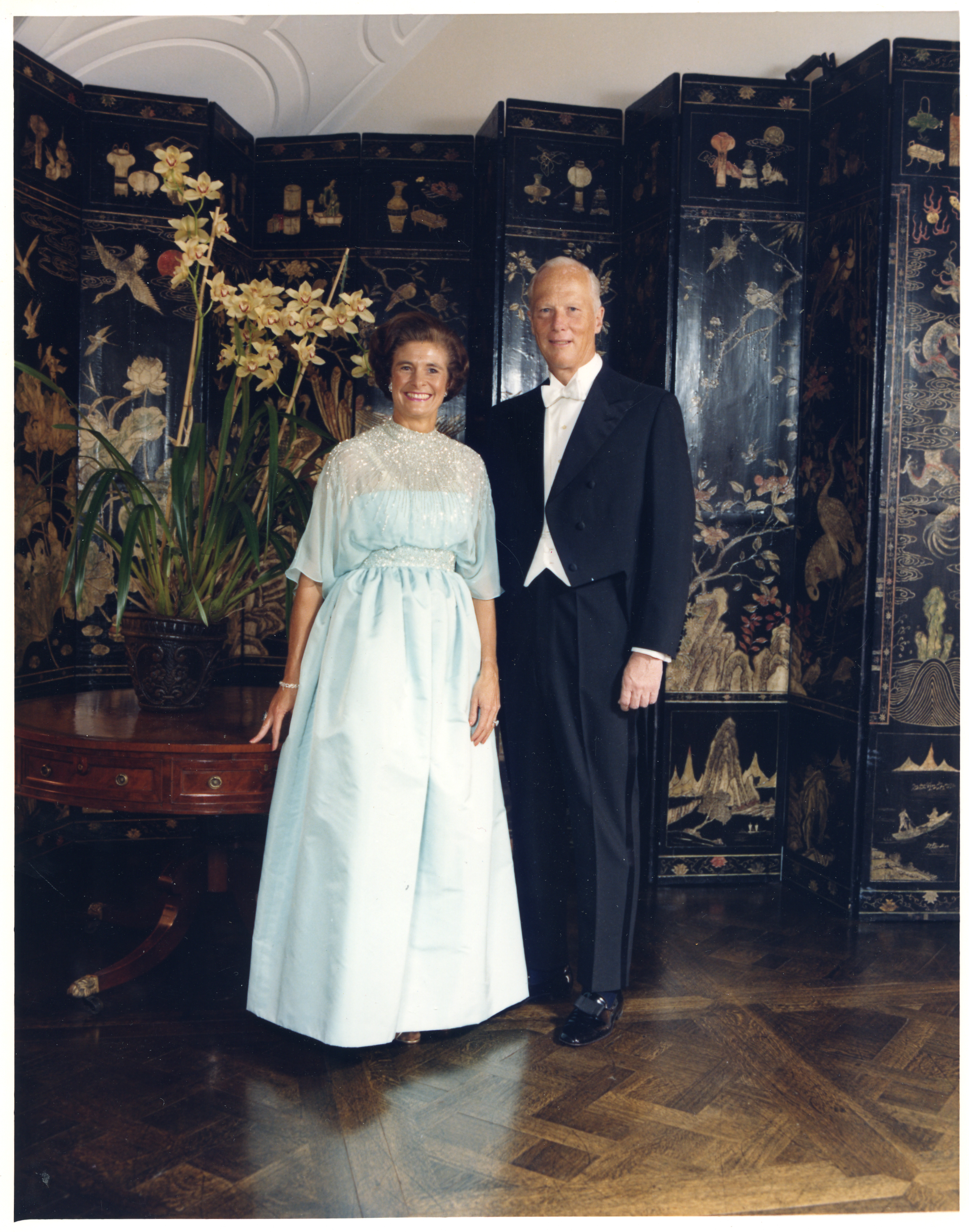
- Born: Josephine Peters; March 13, 1930; Fort Pierce, Florida, U.S.
- Died: January 25, 2026 (aged 95)
- Occupation: Heiress
- Spouse: John J. Louis Jr. (widowed)
- Children: 3

Josephine Louis (née Peters, March 13, 1930 – January 25, 2026) was an American billionaire heiress, the wife of John J. Louis Jr., who served as the United States Ambassador to the United Kingdom.

== Life and career ==
Josephine Peters was born on an orange grove in Fort Pierce, Florida, on March 13, 1930. She was married to John J. Louis Jr. from 1953 until his death in 1995.

Josephine Louis and her children inherited a stake in cleaning product conglomerate "SC Johnson" from John. As of August 2015, she had a net worth of $2.7 billion.

The couple had three children together; John Jeffry Louis III, who sits on the S. C. Johnson & Son board of directors, Kimberly Stewart and Tracy Merrill.

Louis died on January 25, 2026, at the age of 95.
