= Herbert Fisk Johnson Jr. =

American businessman (1899–1978)

- Born: November 15, 1899; Racine, Wisconsin, U.S.
- Died: December 13, 1978 (aged 79); Wind Point, Wisconsin, U.S.
- Resting place: Mound Cemetery, Racine, Wisconsin
- Occupations: Businessman and Manufacturer
- Spouses: Gertrude Brauner Johnson; Esther Jane Johnson (Tilton); Irene Purcell
- Children: Samuel Curtis Johnson Jr. Karen Johnson Boyd
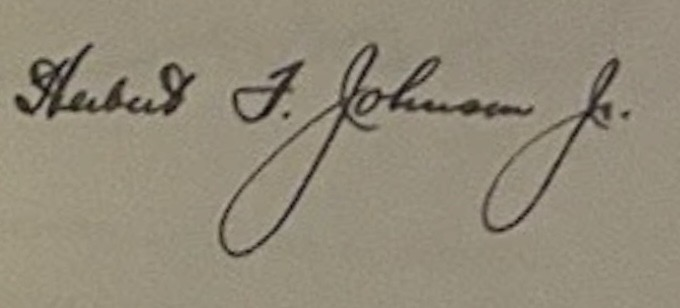
- Parent: Herbert Fisk Johnson Signature

Herbert Fisk Johnson Jr. (November 15, 1899 – December 13, 1978) was an American businessman and manufacturer. He was the grandson of company founder Samuel Curtis Johnson. He was the third generation of his family to lead S. C. Johnson & Son, Inc of Racine, Wisconsin.

== Career in Cornell ==
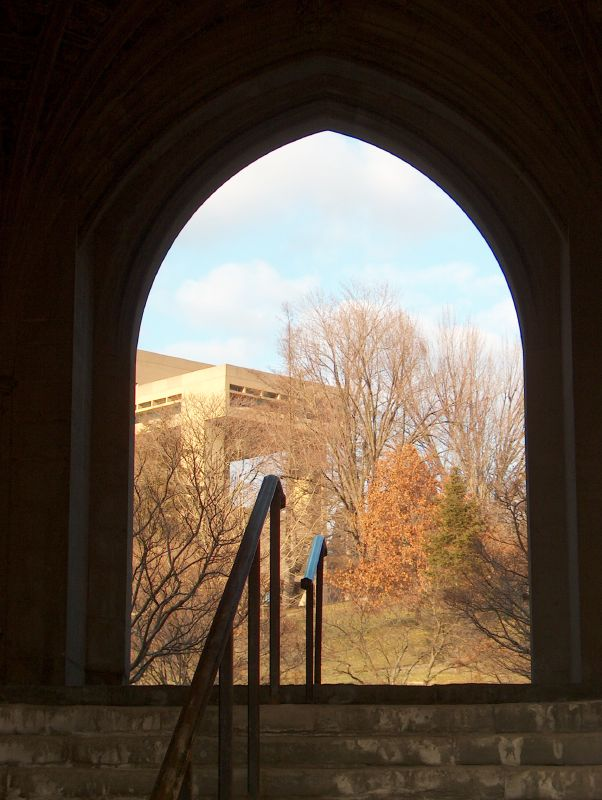
Herbert F. Johnson Museum of Art

Herbert Fisk Johnson Jr. graduated from Cornell University in 1922 and became deeply involved with the institution. From 1947 to 1972, he served as an active member of the board of trustees, followed by his role as an emeritus board member until 1978. He was also a Presidential Councillor and one of the university's most notable benefactors. As a member of the Chi Psi fraternity, he contributed significantly to the Cornell community.

The Herbert F. Johnson Museum of Art on the Cornell campus, designed by renowned architect I. M. Pei, is named in his honor.

== SC Johnson & Son ==
SC Johnson & Son is an American multinational corporation, privately held manufacturer of household cleaning supplies and other consumer chemicals based in Racine, Wisconsin.

Herbert Fisk Johnson Jr. took over leadership of SC Johnson & Son from his father Herbert Fisk Johnson Sr.. Under his presidency, the company expanded worldwide, establishing its first subsidiary in the United Kingdom in 1914. Giving his employees credit for a successful year, Herbert gave them $35,000 in 1917. He then passed it to his son, Samuel Curtis Johnson Jr.. Currently, the Chairman and CEO is Fisk Johnson, the fifth generation of the family.

== Johnson Wax Headquarters ==
S.C. Johnson and Son headquarters building

In 1936, he hired Frank Lloyd Wright to design the Johnson Wax Administration Building for his company in Racine, Wisconsin. The Administration Building, designed in a variation of the streamlined Art Moderne style, opened on April 23, 1939. In the 1940s, the director of S. C. Johnson's research department suggested to Johnson that a research tower be built. Subsequently, Johnson rehired Wright for the construction of a 15-story structure, the Research Tower. The Research Tower was dedicated on November 17, 1950.

== Home ==
Soon after the commission for the Administration Building, Johnson commissioned Wright to build him a home on nearby farmland. The result, known as Wingspread, was built in Wind Point, Wisconsin, and completed in 1939. It was donated by Johnson and his wife Irene Purcell to the Johnson Foundation in 1960 as an international educational conference facility.

== Brazil ==
In 1935, Johnson flew from Milwaukee to Fortaleza, Ceará, Brazil, in an amphibious twin-engine Sikorsky S-38. The trip was to learn more about the carnauba palm tree (Copernicia prunifera) of north eastern Brazil which produced carnauba wax, one of the main products of his company, and to determine whether groves of these trees could produce enough to meet future demand. This led to investments in Brazil, establishment of a subsidiary in 1960, and eventually to the foundation of the Serra das Almas Private Natural Heritage Reserve to protect an area of the caatinga biome including wild carnauba palms. His 1935 two month, 7,500 mile journey to northeastern Brazil as well as his somewhat difficult relationship with his son, Samuel Curtis Johnson Jr., was documented in his son's 2001 film Carnuba: A Son's Memoir. The film includes footage from a repeat of that journey that the Johnson family undertook in 1998.

== Personal life ==
Johnson was married four times, first to Gertrude Brauner, daughter of Cornell University professor Olaf Brauner, in 1923. They were the parents of three children, Karen (b. May 16, 1924), Henrietta (b. April 16, 1927) and Samuel Curtis Jr.(b. March 2, 1928). Herbert and Gertrude were divorced about 1931; their middle daughter Henrietta also died in 1931 (March 30).

He next married (December 31, 1936) the former (Esther) Jane Tilton, the widow of William Clyde Roach of Indianapolis, Indiana. Jane died from an embolism on May 30, 1938 in Racine.

In 1941, Johnson wed Irene Purcell, an actress. They remained married until her death in 1972.

On August 17th 1974, he married the former Georgia Wustum, the widow of Stephan Marshall Cushman, who had died in April 1973. She died October 24,1990.
