= Just a Gigolo (1931 film) =

1931 film by Jack Conway

- Screenshot
- Directed by: Jack Conway
- Written by: Fanny Hatton; Frederic Hatton; Richard Schayer (screen adaptation)
- Based on: Dancing Partner; 1930 play by Alexander Engel; Alfred Grünwald
- Produced by: Irving Thalberg
- Starring: William Haines; Irene Purcell; C. Aubrey Smith; Charlotte Granville
- Cinematography: Oliver T. Marsh
- Edited by: Frank Sullivan
- Production company: Metro-Goldwyn-Mayer
- Release date: June 6, 1931
- Running time: 66 minutes
- Country: United States

Just a Gigolo is a 1931 American Pre-Code romantic comedy film released by MGM. It was directed by Jack Conway, produced by Irving Thalberg and starred William Haines, Irene Purcell, C. Aubrey Smith, and Ray Milland. It was adapted from the 1930 play of the same name, which also starred Irene Purcell in the role of Roxana 'Roxy' Hartley. The film features the song "Just a Gigolo".

== Plot ==
Lord Robert Brummell, an impecunious bachelor, is ordered by his wealthy uncle Lord George Hampton to settle down with a wife. Not wishing to tie himself down to any one girl, Brummell endeavors to prove that no woman is worthy of him by pretending to be a gigolo. When he meets the beautiful, wealthy Roxana Hartley, Lord Robert becomes increasingly frustrated when she deftly resists all his techniques of seduction. But his realisation that he loves her occurs at the same time that Roxana discovers his true identity and decides to pay him back.

== Cast ==
- William Haines as Lord Robert 'Bobby' Brummel
- Irene Purcell as Roxana 'Roxy' Hartley
- C. Aubrey Smith as Lord George Hampton
- Charlotte Granville as Lady Jane Hartley
- Lilian Bond as Lady Agatha Carrol
- Ray Milland as Freddie
- Yola d'Avril as Pauline, Roxana's Maid
- Gerald Fielding as Tony
