= Herbert Fisk Johnson Sr. =

American businessman (1868–1928)

Herbert Fisk Johnson
- Born: May 27, 1868
- Died: February 14, 1928 (aged 59)
- Occupations: Businessman, CEO, S. C. Johnson & Son, Inc
- Children: Herbert Fisk Johnson Jr.; Henrietta Johnson Louis
- Parents: Samuel Curtis Johnson; Caroline Fisk

Herbert Fisk Johnson (May 27, 1868 – February 14, 1928) was an American businessman. He was the son of company founder Samuel Curtis Johnson Sr. He was the second generation of his family to lead S. C. Johnson & Son, Inc., of Racine, Wisconsin, United States.

== Early life ==
Born near Elyria, Ohio, Johnson moved to Elkhorn, Wisconsin with his family. He then moved to Racine, Wisconsin.

== Career ==
When he became partner in 1906, Johnson's Prepared Paste Wax Company was renamed S. C. Johnson & Son.

== Personal life ==
He died in 1928, without leaving a will, and after a long legal battle, his estate was split equally between his two children, Herbert Fisk Johnson Jr. and Henrietta Johnson Louis. Herbert was the third generation to lead the company.
