= Keland House =

House in Racine, Wisconsin

Coordinates: 42°44′10″N 87°49′12″W

The Keland House, also known as the Keland-Johnson House, is located in Racine, Wisconsin, United States. It was designed by Frank Lloyd Wright in 1954, almost 50 years after he designed the Thomas P. Hardy House in Racine. It is currently known as the Boyd Home.

== Background ==
The residence is on a bluff, cantilevered over the Root River and overlooking Colonial Park. The only furniture that Wright designed for the home were built-ins: ledges, bookcases, cabinets and sofas. The first time Wright visited the home after it was completed, he proceeded to rearrange the furniture. It has multiple wings, with an inner atrium. The primary construction material is brick, with a copper roof.

The house has about 5,000 square feet (460 m^{2}) and is built atop a bluff. The Keland House is an example of Wright's Usonian Homes, though larger than most of his Usonian homes. The dining area flows into the living room, with the kitchen at the "hinge" of the dining room and living room. Part of the house is cantilevered above the adjacent ravine.

The home was designed for the daughter of Herbert Fisk Johnson Jr., Karen, and her first husband Willard Keland. The home was transferred upon their divorce to Karen Johnson, later Karen Johnson Boyd, who lived there until her death in 2016. The house was placed on sale in 2022 for the first time in its history; a limited-liability company bought it that October for $1,025,000.

The house remains privately owned.

== See also ==
- List of Frank Lloyd Wright works
