= John Jeffry Louis III =

American businessman

- Born: February 8, 1963 (age 63); Evanston, Illinois
- Education: Deerfield Academy, Williams College, Northwestern University
- Alma mater: Williams College
- Occupation: Businessman
- Parent(s): John J. Louis Jr. Josephine Louis

John Jeffry Louis is the chairman of Gannett Co, a board member of The Olayan Group and S. C. Johnson & Son, Inc.; and chairman of the U.S./ U.K. Fulbright Commission.

== Biography ==
He is the son of former ambassador John J. Louis Jr. and his wife, Josephine Louis.

Louis was named to the Crain's Chicago Business "40 under 40" list in 2001 when his start-up, Parsons Group LLC, rose to the position of Inc. Magazine's list of 500 fastest-growing companies.

He was vice chairman of Frye-Louis Capital Management Inc, and a director of S.C. Johnson & Son, The Johnson Financial Group, The City Bakery LLC, Schirf Brewing Company and Eximous Inc.
