= Charles H. Price II =

American diplomat

His Excellency Charles H. Price II
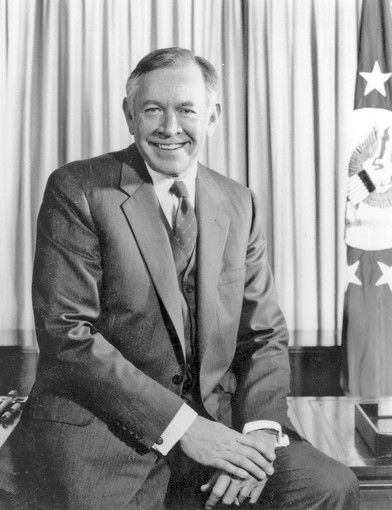

United States Ambassador to the United Kingdom
- In office December 20, 1983 – February 28, 1989
- President: Ronald Reagan; George H. W. Bush
- Preceded by: John J. Louis Jr.
- Succeeded by: Henry E. Catto Jr.

United States Ambassador to Belgium
- In office July 3, 1981 – November 15, 1983
- President: Ronald Reagan
- Preceded by: Anne Cox Chambers
- Succeeded by: Geoffrey Swaebe

Personal details
- Born: April 1, 1931 Kansas City, Missouri, U.S.
- Died: January 12, 2012 (aged 80) Indian Wells, California, U.S.
- Resting place: Forest Hill Calvary Cemetery; Kansas City, Missouri, U.S.
- Party: Republican
- Spouse: Carol Swanson Price
- Occupation: Diplomat; businessman

Charles Harry Price II (April 1, 1931 – January 12, 2012) was an American businessman and ambassador of the United States.

== Early life ==
Price was born to a family in Kansas City, Missouri which owned a local candy manufacturing firm, the Price Candy Company. He attended Wentworth Military Academy in Lexington, Missouri, and then the Pembroke-Country Day School in Kansas City, where he graduated in 1948. He obtained his Bachelor of Arts degree from the University of Missouri in 1953. After college, between 1953 and 1955, he served in the United States Air Force.

After his discharge from the Air Force, Price returned to Kansas City to begin a prominent career in the local banking industry. He served as chairman and President of American Bancorporation, Inc., chairman and CEO of the American Bank and Trust Company, and chairman and President of Linwood Securities Company. He also ran his family's candy company, serving as chairman and CEO from 1969 to 1981.

== Public life ==
In the spring of 1981, President Ronald Reagan appointed Price to be United States Ambassador to Belgium. He was quickly and unanimously confirmed by the United States Senate. In 1983, President Reagan recalled Price from his post in Belgium and appointed him Ambassador to the United Kingdom. The Senate again confirmed him unanimously, and he held the post until the end of the Reagan Administration in 1989. As Ambassador to the United Kingdom, he was instrumental in handling the aftermath of the bombing of Pan Am Flight 103 in 1988 and was the first U.S. government official on the scene in Lockerbie, Scotland on the night of the bombing. He gave the first indication that it was the worst terrorist attack against the U.S. when he told reporters that 70% of those on board were Americans.

Upon returning from his ambassadorial post in April 1989, Price was appointed chairman of the board of Ameribanc, Inc., and then became president and CEO in 1990. Ameribanc merged with Mercantile Bancorporation in May 1992, and Price became chairman of the board of Mercantile Bank of Kansas City and Mercantile Bank of Kansas. He held this position until retiring in 1996.

Price also served as a Director of British Airways (1989–1996), Hanson plc (1989–1995), US Industries, Inc. (1995–2004), The New York Times Company (1989–2002), Texaco (1989–2001), and Sprint (1989–1995). In Kansas City, he served on numerous philanthropic boards. He also received numerous awards and honorary degrees for his public service.

Price lived in Indian Wells, California with his wife, Carol Swanson Price, after his retirement. He died on January 12, 2012, in Indian Wells and was buried at Forest Hill Calvary Cemetery in Kansas City, Missouri.

According to Alison Kervin's book The Monster of Harrods, while Price was serving as ambassador to the UK, his then 16-year-old daughter said she was raped by Mohamed Al-Fayed, the owner of Harrods. Price reportedly advised her to "keep schtum" (quiet).

Diplomatic posts
Preceded by Anne Cox Chambers	U.S. Ambassador to Belgium; 1981–1983	Succeeded by Geoffrey Swaebe
Preceded by John J. Louis Jr.	U.S. Ambassador to the United Kingdom; 1983–1989	Succeeded by Henry E. Catto Jr.
