= John J. Louis Jr. =

American diplomat

John Jeffry Louis Jr.
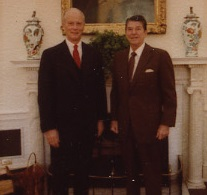
- 1981 (on left)

United States Ambassador to the United Kingdom
- In office May 27, 1981 – November 7, 1983
- President: Ronald Reagan
- Preceded by: Kingman Brewster Jr.
- Succeeded by: Charles H. Price II

Personal details
- Born: June 10, 1925 Evanston, Illinois, US
- Died: February 15, 1995 (aged 69) Winnetka, Illinois, US
- Spouse: Josephine Louis
- Children: 3
- Parent(s): John Jeffry Louis; Henrietta Johnson Louis
- Education: Williams College (BA); Dartmouth College (MBA)
- Occupation: Businessman, diplomat

John Jeffry Louis Jr. (June 10, 1925 – February 15, 1995) was an American businessman and diplomat. He served as the United States Ambassador to the United Kingdom.

== Early life ==
John J. Louis Jr., was born in Evanston, Illinois, to Chicago advertiser John Jeffry Louis and Johnson Wax heiress Henrietta Johnson Louis. He grew up in the Chicago area.

During the Second World War, he served in the United States Army Air Forces (1943–1945), where he was a second lieutenant and pilot. After the war, he received a bachelor of arts degree from Williams College and a master in business administration from the Tuck School of Business at Dartmouth College in 1949.

== Career ==
Entering business in 1951, John J. Louis Jr. started in his father's advertising firm, Needham, Louis, and Brorby. In 1953, he married Josephine Louis (née Peters), with whom he had three children. He then joined S.C. Johnson and Son in 1958. S.C. Johnson was the successor company of his great-grandfather's company, Johnson Wax. At S.C. Johnson, John J. Louis Jr. was director of international marketing until 1961.

From 1961 to 1968, he was chairman of KTAR Broadcasting in Phoenix, Arizona, until it merged with a local billboard company to form Combined Communications Corporation. He then served as chair of the merged company. In 1979, Combined Communications merged with Gannett, and Louis joined Gannett.

His first diplomatic work was in the ceremonial role of Special Ambassador in 1972 at an independence celebration in Gabon, during the presidency of Richard Nixon. More substantially, he was nominated to the post of United States Ambassador to the United Kingdom by President Ronald Reagan on March 27, 1981. He served in that post until his resignation on September 19, 1983. In his resignation, Louis expressed optimism about the quality of relations with the United Kingdom and the government of Margaret Thatcher, yet stated his desire to return to corporate and philanthropic pursuits.

== Philanthropy ==
Louis served as a trustee of Northwestern University in Evanston, Illinois, where he had a building, John J. Louis Hall named for his father, John J. Louis, who had also been a trustee of the university. The building, which houses Northwestern's professional production and post-production facilities for the Department of Radio/Television/Film as well as public radio WNUR 89.3 FM and a classroom/lab for the Medill School of Journalism still exists on Northwestern's South end of campus today near Norris University Center.

== Death and legacy ==
On February 15, 1995, Louis died in his home in Winnetka, Illinois, at age 69. His son John Jeffry Louis III has continued the family tradition, serving on the boards of directors of S.C. Johnson and Gannett, as well as the Northwestern University board of trustees.

Diplomatic posts
Preceded by Kingman Brewster Jr.	U.S. Ambassador to the United Kingdom; 1981–1983	Succeeded by Charles H. Price II
