= Berto Lardera =

Italian sculptor

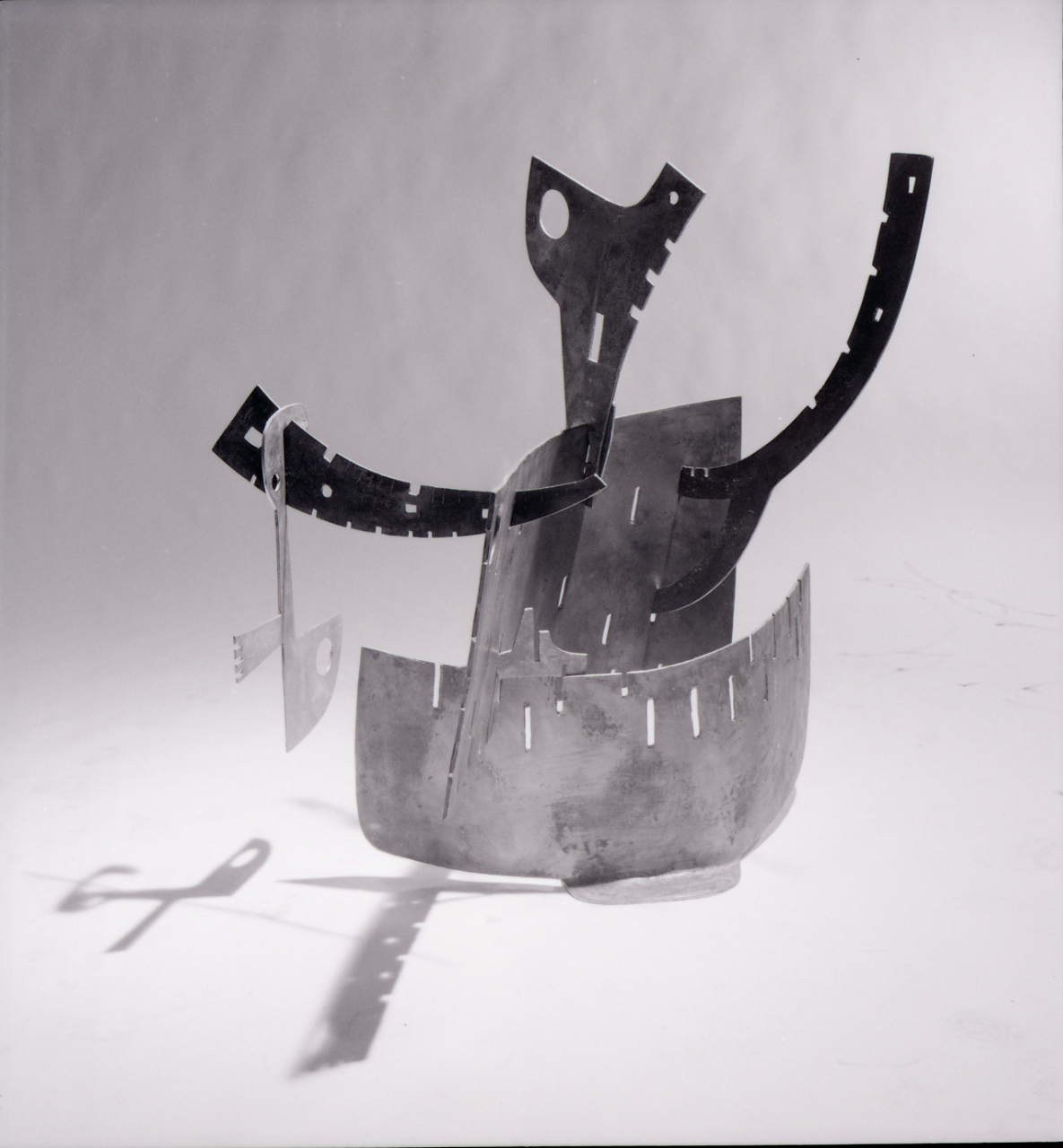
Sculpture by Lardera. Photo by Paolo Monti, 1964.

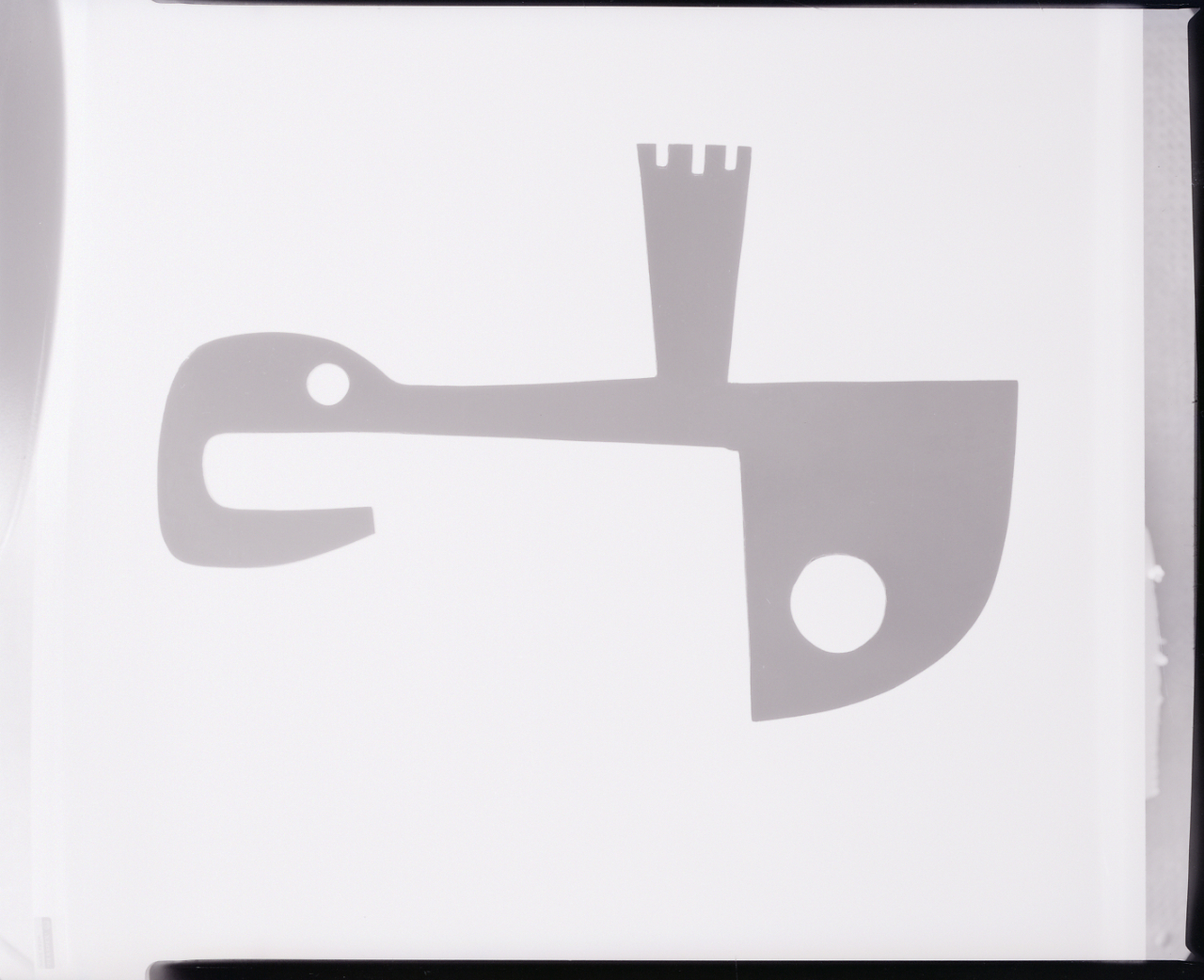
Photo by Paolo Monti, 1964.

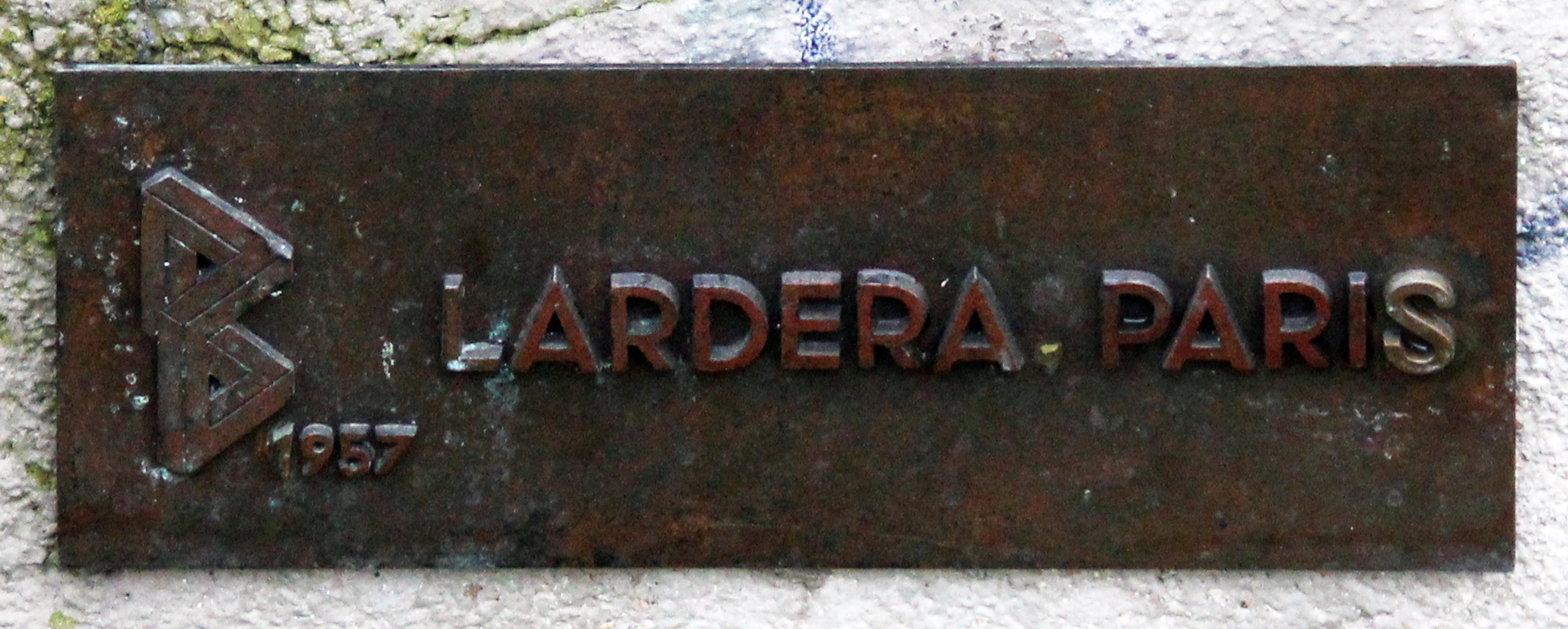
Memorial plaque, Berto Lardera, Altonaer Straße 9, Berlin-Hansaviertel, Germany

Roberto Lardera (December 18, 1911 – February 23, 1989), informally known as Berto Lardera, was an Italian sculptor of the 20th century. He was born in La Spezia, Italy, the son of a naval engineer. He was self-taught and his leanings towards monumental, metallic sculptures may have been influenced by the sights he grew up with in the naval dockyards.

In 1947 Lardera moved to Paris, where he remained until his death in 1989. He exhibited at the Galerie Denise René and then at the Salon de Mai and the Salon des Réalités Nouvelles. Lardera's sculpture began with abstract metal structures based on two dimensions, or a flat geometrical plane, which challenged the conventional form of sculpture based around volume and enclosed spaces. Later his work became more diverse, with his geometrical constructions branching out into the horizontal as well as the vertical plane and often resulting in series based on a single theme, such as his Miracles, Aubes and Archanges series.

His sculptures are to be found the world over, in Europe, America and Japan. They show the use of a wide range of different metals, as well as different dimensions. Lardera did not produce very many prints, but his interest in using different planes and dimensions led to him making markedly "sculptural" prints. He used a unique technique, cutting forms and designs with his sculpting tools in thick iron plates from which the prints were pulled. He used no acid or chemical processes.

== Bibliography ==
- Lardera, Berto (2002). Berto Lardera, entre deux mondes : 1er juin-25 août 2002. Musée de Grenoble. Paris: Réunion des musées nationaux. ISBN 2-7118-4384-X. OCLC 52127737.
- Lardera, Berto; Kunstverein; Ausstellung Berto Lardera (1971). Berto Lardera: 24. April - 6. Juni 1971; Kunstverein Hannover (in German). Hannover: Kunstverein. OCLC 258085268.
- Lardera, Berto; Galleria L'obelisco (1962). Berto Lardera: L'Obelisco, Roma : aperta dal 10 marzo 1962 (in Italian). Roma: L'Obelisco. OCLC 878629524.
- Lardera, Berto; Seuphor, Michel; Salzmann, Siegfried; Güse, Ernst-Gerhard; Wilhelm-Lehmbruck-Museum der Stadt Duisburg; Koninklijk Museum voor Schone Kunsten (Belgium) (1976). Berto lardera: plastiken-collagen-graphiken (in German). DUISBURG, GERMANY: LEHMBRUCK MUSEUM DER STADT DUISBURG. OCLC 213595840.
