= Wind Point, Wisconsin =

- Village
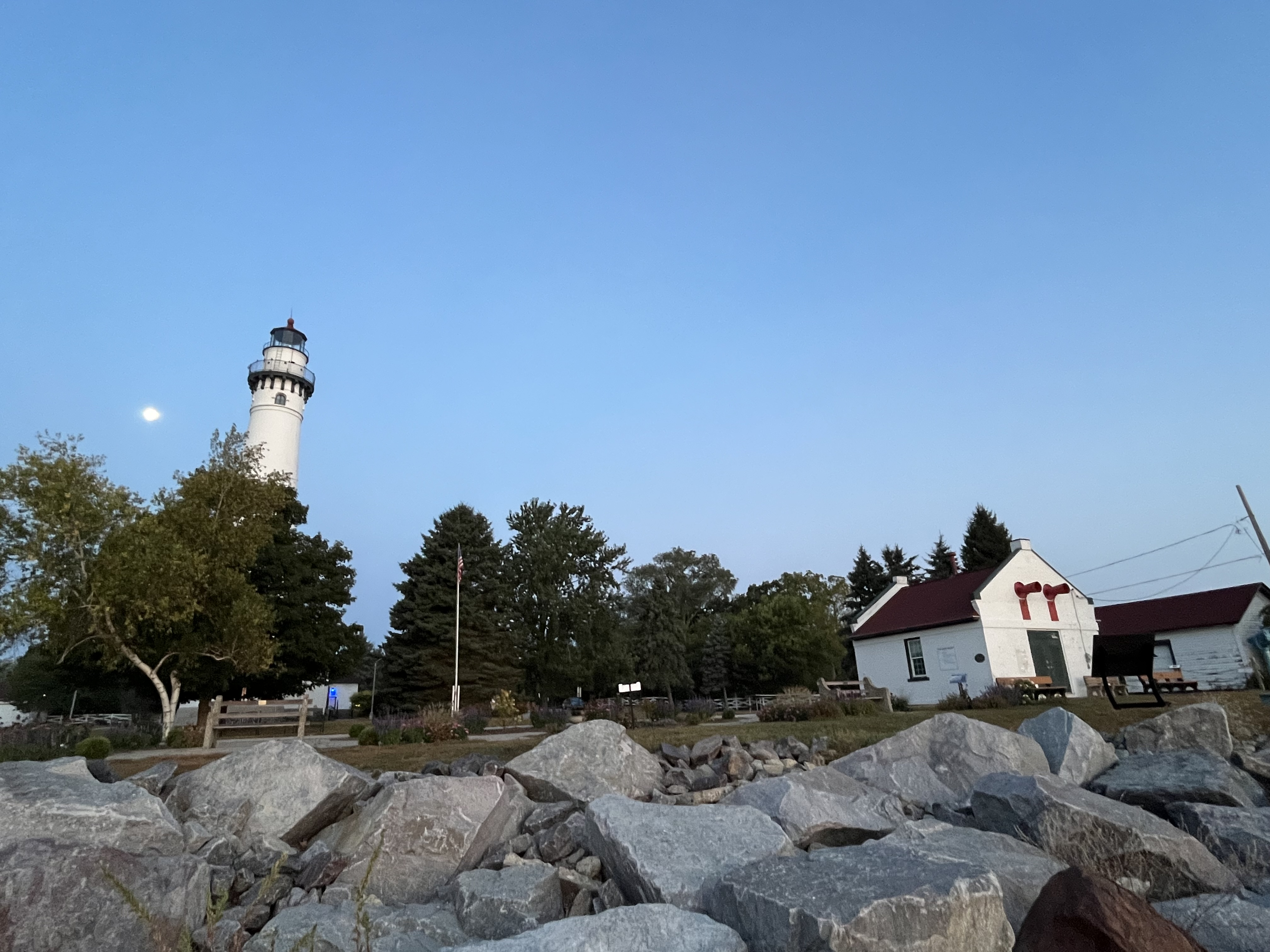

- Location of Wind Point in Racine County, Wisconsin.
- Coordinates: 42°46′57″N 87°46′27″W
- Country: United States
- State: Wisconsin
- County: Racine

Area
  - Total: 1.29 sq mi (3.34 km^{2})
  - Land: 1.27 sq mi (3.28 km^{2})
  - Water: 0.027 sq mi (0.07 km^{2})
- Elevation: 614 ft (187 m)

Population (2020)
  - Total: 1,651
  - Density: 1,339.3/sq mi (517.09/km^{2})
- Time zone: UTC-6 (Central (CST))
  - Summer (DST): UTC-5 (CDT)
- Area code: 262
- FIPS code: 55-87700
- GNIS feature ID: 1576848
- Website: www.windpoint.org

Wind Point is a village in Racine County, Wisconsin, United States. The population was 1,651 at the 2020 census.

== Geography ==
Wind Point is located at 42°46′57″N 87°46′27″W (42.782452, -87.774173).

According to the United States Census Bureau, the village has a total area of 1.42 square miles (3.68 km^{2}), of which 1.25 square miles (3.24 km^{2}) is land and 0.17 square miles (0.44 km^{2}) is water.

== Demographics ==
Historical population
| Census | Pop. | Note | %± |
|---|---|---|---|
| 1960 | 463 | | — |
| 1970 | 1,251 | | 170.2% |
| 1980 | 1,695 | | 35.5% |
| 1990 | 1,941 | | 14.5% |
| 2000 | 1,853 | | −4.5% |
| 2010 | 1,723 | | −7.0% |
| 2020 | 1,651 | | −4.2% |
U.S. Decennial Census

=== 2010 census ===
As of the census of 2010, there were 1,723 people, 731 households, and 551 families living in the village. The population density was 1,378.4 inhabitants per square mile (532.2/km^{2}). There were 776 housing units at an average density of 620.8 per square mile (239.7/km^{2}). The racial makeup of the village was 95.7% European American, 0.8% African American, 0.1% Native American, 2.3% Asian, 0.5% from other races, and 0.7% from two or more races. Hispanic or Latino of any race were 2.3% of the population.

There were 731 households, of which 23.8% had children under the age of 18 living with them, 70.2% were married couples living together, 3.7% had a female householder with no husband present, 1.5% had a male householder with no wife present, and 24.6% were non-families. 21.8% of all households were made up of individuals, and 12.1% had someone living alone who was 65 years of age or older. The average household size was 2.36 and the average family size was 2.75.

The median age in the village was 52.4 years. 19% of residents were under the age of 18; 4.2% were between the ages of 18 and 24; 12.9% were from 25 to 44; 40.4% were from 45 to 64; and 23.3% were 65 years of age or older. The gender makeup of the village was 48.1% male and 51.9% female.

=== 2000 census ===
As of the census of 2000, there were 1,853 people, 736 households, and 587 families living in the village. The population density was 1,513.5 people per square mile (586.4/km^{2}). There were 757 housing units at an average density of 618.3 per square mile (239.6/km^{2}). The racial makeup of the village was 94.7% European American, 0.3% African American, 0.2% Native American, 3.0% Asian, 0.1% from other races, and 1.7% from two or more races. Hispanic or Latino of any race were 1.3% of the population.

There were 736 households, out of which 29.5% had children under the age of 18 living with them, 75.3% were married couples living together, 3.8% had a female householder with no husband present, and 20.2% were non-families. 17.8% of all households were made up of individuals, and 9.4% had someone living alone who was 65 years of age or older. The average household size was 2.52 and the average family size was 2.86.

In the village, the population was spread out, with 23.5% under the age of 18, 3.3% from 18 to 24, 20.0% from 25 to 44, 37.4% from 45 to 64, and 15.7% who were 65 years of age or older. The median age was 47 years. For every 100 females, there were 96.3 males. For every 100 females age 18 and over, there were 92.5 males.

The median income for a household in the village was $88,521, while the median income for a family is $100,614. Males had a median income of $85,555 versus $49,722 for females. The per capita income for the village was $53,104. About 2.8% of families and 3.9% of the population were below the poverty line, including 3.0% of those under age 18 and 5.7% of those age 65 or over.

== Education ==
=== Public schools ===
Wind Point is part of the Racine Unified School District. Olympia Brown and North Park elementary schools serve sections of the town, while all residents are zoned to Jerstad-Agerholm K-8 School (formerly Jerstad Middle School) for middle school levels and Horlick High School.

The town's only public elementary school, Wind Point Elementary School, which served all of the municipality, opened in 1966. In 2012 it had 237 students, with 50% coming from outside of the school's catchment zone; in the previous year it had the lowest enrollment of any of the elementary schools of Racine USD. Ann Laing, the superintendent of Racine USD, characterized the school as having substandard scores on tests.

Wind Point was closed following the 2012–2013 school year. The school board voted for the closure on a 7 to 1 (Julie McKenna being the sole opposing vote) basis, with one board member, Melvin Hargrove, not appearing. McKenna cited her belief that schools with small student populations would be beneficial. The closure resulted in a $600,000 cost savings for Racine USD. Kathryn Poznanski was the school's final principal.

The Wind Point Elementary building temporarily housed Mitchell Elementary School students in 2014 after a fire damaged that school's permanent campus, but otherwise the school remained unused and the district continued maintaining the building. In 2017 town residents asked the school district to raze the building. In November 2017 the Racine USD school board agreed to have the building given to a limited-liability corporation which would raze the building for fears of vandalism and of perceived poor maintenance. The fixtures and other items in the building were sold in February 2018. Demolition began in April 2018, with housing slated to appear on the former school property.

=== Private schools ===
A private non-parochial school, The Prairie School, serves students in preschool through 12th grade.

== Notable buildings ==
- The Wind Point Lighthouse is located within the village.
- Frank Lloyd Wright's Wingspread (also known as the Herbert F. Johnson House) is located within the village.
