= Samuel Curtis Johnson Sr. =

Founder of S. C. Johnson & Son Inc.

Samuel Curtis Johnson
- Born: December 24, 1833; Elyria, Ohio, U.S.
- Died: December 6, 1919 (aged 85); Racine, Wisconsin, U.S.
- Resting place: Green Ridge Cemetery, Kenosha, Wisconsin
- Occupation: Businessman
- Known for: Founder, S. C. Johnson & Son, Inc.
- Spouse: Caroline Fisk
- Children: Herbert Fisk Johnson Sr.
- Parent(s): Phineas Miller Johnson; Orra Ann Collins

Samuel Curtis Johnson (December 24, 1833 – December 6, 1919) was an American businessman. He was the founder of S. C. Johnson & Son, Inc., of Racine, Wisconsin.

== Life ==
Johnson was the son of Phineas Miller Johnson and Orra Ann Collins. He had deep New England roots; his great-grandfather Henry Johnson married Abigail Hubbard, a great-granddaughter of George Phillips, one of the founders of Watertown, Massachusetts. Johnson's ancestor Henry Johnson arrived in the Connecticut Valley from England in 1626.

In 1882, Johnson moved to Racine, where he became a parquet flooring salesman for the Racine Hardware Manufacturing Co. In 1886, he bought the flooring business from the company and renamed it Johnson's Prepared Paste Wax Company. A few years later, he established his own factory for floor waxes and wood finishes. When his son, Herbert Fisk Johnson, Sr., became a partner in 1906, the firm was renamed S. C. Johnson & Son.

== Legacy ==
The S. C. Johnson Company is still privately held by the Johnson family. It operates in more than 70 countries, employs 12,000 people, and sells products in more than 110 countries. The Samuel Curtis Johnson Graduate School of Management at Cornell University is named in his honor.

== See also ==
- Samuel Curtis Johnson Graduate School of Management
