= Curtis Johnson =

Curtis Johnson may refer to:

- Curt Johnson (soccer) (born 1968), soccer manager
- Curt Johnson, the creator of the Microsoft Minesweeper computer game
- Curtis Johnson (cornerback) (born 1948), former cornerback
- Curtis Johnson (linebacker) (born 1985), American football player
- Curtis Johnson (politician) (born 1952), American politician
- Curtis Johnson (American football coach) (born 1961), football coach
- Curtis Johnson (sprinter) (born 1973), American athlete
- S. Curtis Johnson, business magnate
- Dan Curtis Johnson, programmer and comic book writer

== See also ==
- Samuel Curtis Johnson (disambiguation)
- Kirk Johnson (born 1972), Canadian boxer
