= Helen Johnson-Leipold =

American billionaire businesswoman

- Occupations: Chairman and CEO of Johnson Outdoors
- Spouse: Craig Leipold
- Parent(s): Samuel Curtis Johnson Jr. Imogene Powers Johnson
- Relatives: Herbert Fisk Johnson III; S. Curtis Johnson; Winnie Johnson-Marquart (siblings)

Helen Johnson-Leipold is an American businesswoman.

== Biography ==
Johnson-Leipold was born in Racine, Wisconsin, to Samuel Curtis Johnson Jr. and Imogene Powers Johnson. She is the great-great-granddaughter of S. C. Johnson & Son founder Samuel Curtis Johnson Sr. She was elected chair and CEO of Johnson Outdoors in 1999 and elected chair of Johnson Financial Group in 2004.

She began her career at Foote, Cone & Belding in Chicago in 1979 and joined S. C. Johnson & Son in 1985. She is tied with her three siblings and mother at #182 on the Forbes 400 list of richest Americans.

Helen and her husband, Minnesota Wild owner Craig Leipold, maintain residences in Racine and Saint Paul, Minnesota, and have five children.
