= Samuel Curtis Johnson =

Samuel Curtis Johnson may refer to:

- Samuel Curtis Johnson Sr. (1833–1919), founder of S. C. Johnson & Son
- Samuel Curtis Johnson Jr. (1922–2004)

== See also ==
- S. Curtis Johnson, former chairman of JohnsonDiversey
- Samuel Curtis Johnson Graduate School of Management, Cornell University
- Samuel Johnson (disambiguation)
