= Bob Naegele Jr. =

Hockey franchise owner (1939–2018)

Robert O. Naegele Jr. (1939 – November 7, 2018) was the founding owner of the Minnesota Wild of the National Hockey League.

Naegele grew up in Minnetonka, Minnesota, and was a star goaltender at Minnetonka High School. A 1961 graduate of Dartmouth College, Naegele inherited his father's billboard company and eventually became wealthy in his own right. Later, he was the owner of Rollerblade, an in-line skate manufacturer, and prospered during the in-line skating craze of the 1980s and 1990s. He sold his stake in 1995, and donated the proceeds to every employee of the company.

A lifelong hockey fan, Naegele joined a group of hockey enthusiasts working to return the NHL to the Twin Cities, which were still smarting from the loss of the Minnesota North Stars to Dallas in 1993. In 1997, the NHL granted an expansion franchise to Naegele and his group, which began play in 2000 as the Wild. He served as the team's chairman until 2008, when he sold the team to current owner Craig Leipold. Soon after selling the team, he was awarded the Lester Patrick Trophy for service to hockey in the United States, sharing that year's award with Ted Lindsay, Brian Burke and Phil Housley.

Although he lived in Naples, Florida for most of the year, Naegele was very involved with the team. He was often seen greeting fans as they arrived for games at Xcel Energy Center.

Naegele opposed same sex marriage and donated $50,000 towards the 2012 failed constitutional amendment to ban same-sex marriage in the state of Minnesota.

Naegele died on November 7, 2018, due to complications with cancer. The Wild wore a commemorative patch with his initials on their uniforms for the rest of the 2018-19 season.

Sporting positions
New creation	Minnesota Wild principal owner 2000–2008	Succeeded by Craig Leipold
