= NCH Corporation =

American industrial supply company

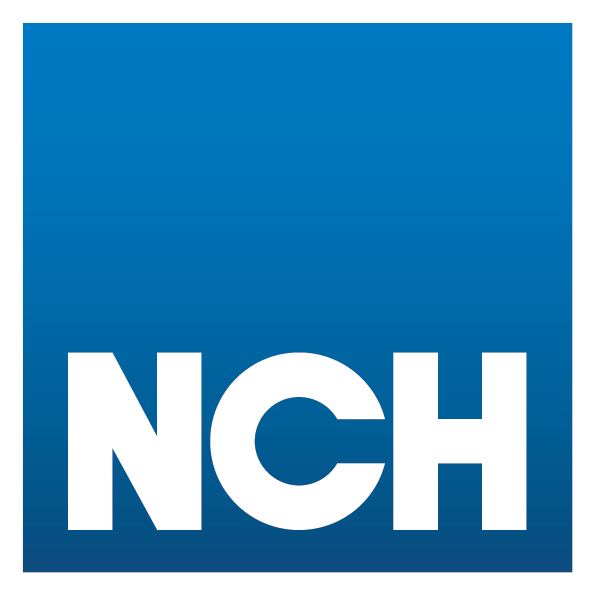
- Formerly: National Disinfectant Company; National Chemsearch Corporation
- Founded: 1919; 107 years ago
- Founder: Milton P. Levy
- Owner: Solenis
- Website: www.nch.com

NCH Corporation is an international marketer of maintenance, Lubrication, Parts Cleaning and Water Treatment products. It is one of the largest companies in the world to sell such products through direct marketing channels. NCH has several wholly owned subsidiaries, some of them in the maintenance products business.

The Chemical Specialties Division include National Chemsearch and Certified Laboratories. Their products include industrial drain and waste biologicals, oils and lubricants, and industrial maintenance chemicals. Chemical Specialties also includes X-Chem / Terra Services, an oil field chemical products and services division; Pure Solve, a parts washing service business; and Chem-Aqua, a water treatment service business.

The Partsmaster group sell parts for maintenance and repair, including welding supplies and fasteners. The Plumbing Products Group provides plumbing supplies for the retail consumer and the OEM market. The Retail Products Group markets pet supplies.

NCH has over 8,500 employees. Its branch offices and manufacturing plants are located on six continents, and its products are sold in over 50 different countries. Since 2013, revenue has consistently exceeded $1 billion.

In November 2025, it was announced that Solenis had completed the purchase of the company.

== History ==
=== 1919 to 1940 ===
National Disinfectant Company, the original incarnation of NCH Corporation, was founded in Dallas, Texas, by Milton P. Levy in 1919. The Levy family has controlled NCH throughout its history. Levy's three sons, Lester, Milton Jr., and Irvin, started working in the company warehouse and shipping areas as teenagers.

NCH's original product line included a coal tar disinfectant, an insecticide, and a liquid hand soap for institutional use. In the late 1930s, NCH introduced Everbrite, a heavy-duty industrial floor wax. Everbrite eventually evolved into a multi-purpose cleaner that kills bacteria.

=== 1940 to 1960 ===
When Milton P Levy Sr. died in 1946, his widow, Ruth Levy took over as NCH president. Lester Levy assumed control of the small NCH sales force. Milton Levy Jr developed a sales territory in Austin, Texas and his brother developed another sales territory in Dallas-Fort Worth.

In 1947, NCH reached $300,000 in sales. The Levy's were assisted in running the company by Jack Mann, National Disinfectant's top sales representative since joining the company in the 1920s. Mann would stay with NCH for 40 years. The NCH Mantek chemical division was named for Mann him after his death in 1968.

In the 1950s, NCH began to integrate vertically and to expand its marketing area. The company began to reinvest a sizeable portion of its profits in manufacturing and research facilities in order to decrease its reliance on outside producers for its products. In the early 1950s, NCH acquired Certified Laboratories. Certified continued to operate as an independent company with its own brand name and its own sales force, but this wholly owned subsidiary was generating over one-fourth of the company's revenue within a few years.

By the middle of the decade, NCH was shipping its products by railroad to Oklahoma, Louisiana, Arizona, and New Mexico. In 1956, NCH established it first branch office in St. Louis. During this period, NCH created a sales management team and standardized its sales training. NCH opened new plants in Texas, New Jersey, California, Puerto Rico, and Indiana.

=== 1960 to 1970 ===
In 1960, NCH changed its name to National Chemsearch Corporation to better reflect its current product line. During this period, NCH expanded sales to the Caribbean region, Canada, Central America, South America and Europe.

In 1962, NCH moved its administrative offices, laboratories and manufacturing operations to Irving, Texas. That same year, NCH acquired Hallmark Chemical Corporation, which sold a line of building products, In 1964, NCH purchased Lamkin Brothers, Inc., a marketer of vitamin and mineral supplements for livestock.

In 1965, NCH made it first public stock offering. However, the Levy family retained control of NCH with a 70 percent stock holding. With Ruth Levy retired, Lester Levy became chairman of the board, overseeing corporate planning and finance. Milton Levy Jr. handled production, distribution, and product development as chairman of the executive committee. Irvin Levy was company president and in charge of expanding both domestic and foreign sales.

Between 1962 and 1966, NCH sales grew at an average rate of 29 percent a year. By 1966, NCH was earning $2.4 million on sales of $25 million. Much of the company's success was attributed to its direct sales methods, which eliminated the need for wholesalers or other intermediaries. By offering a broad range of products to a large number of customers (many of them relatively small shops and plants), NCH was able to compete favorably with larger competitors that concentrated on major customers.

By 1967, NCH employed more than 600 sales representatives. None of the company's 40,000 customers accounted for even one percent of its sales. About 60 percent of these customers were industrial or commercial clients; the rest were institutions such as hospitals and schools. The greatest share of sales (over 60 percent) was still coming from cleaning chemicals at that time. Constant research was adding about 20 products a year to the line. Toward the end of the 1960s, NCH created the Plumbmaster and Partsmaster divisions. The establishment of these divisions meant that the growing number of newly acquired subsidiaries could be grouped according to the nature of their products.

In February 1969 NCH stock was listed on the New York Stock Exchange for the first time.

=== 1970 to 1980 ===
By 1970, the NCH product line included about 250 items, sold under the names "National Chemsearch," "Certified," "Mantek," and "Dyna Systems" (fasteners). Turf maintenance supplies, paints and sealers, and sewage treatment chemicals were offered along with the growing list of cleaning chemicals.

NCH sales and profits continued to grow slowly into the early 1970s. By 1971, sales had reached $69 million, with net income of $6.6 million. About 20 percent of the company's revenue derived from foreign sales by this time. In 1970, NCH purchased P & M Manufacturing Company of Los Angeles and the Pennsylvania-based Daniel P. Creed Co., Inc., in 1972. P & M, with annual sales of about $1.5 million in the plumbing maintenance industry, was acquired for 8,686 shares of common stock. Creed, also in the plumbing supply business, was a cash purchase.

By 1973, sales at NCH reached $103 million. About 3,000 sales representatives were handling the company's products by the mid-1970s. In 1977, specialty chemicals accounted for about 90 percent of sales. The remaining 10 percent was derived from fasteners, plumbing parts, and welding supplies. NCH's goal of reducing reliance on outside manufacturers had mainly been achieved by this time, as nearly all of the company's specialty chemicals were being fabricated at its own facilities, the exception being its turf maintenance products. NCH annual sales doubled again by 1978, reaching $200 million. The company changed its name from National Chemsearch to NCH Corporation that year. Again the rationale was to reflect the increasing diversity of NCH product lines.

In 1978, NCH purchased Specialty Products Co., a manufacturer of specialty plumbing items. Specialty Products, based in Stanton, California, had yearly sales of about $4 million. In 1979, NCH acquired the domestic assets of American Allsafe Co. This acquisition paved the way for the development of the company's safety equipment division, which supplied as eye and head protection gear to the increasingly safety-conscious industrial world. In 1979, NCH launched Kernite SA, a new trading company in Belgium that sold chemicals, petrochemicals, and lubricants.

=== 1980 to 2000 ===
NCH's previously steady growth in sales stalled somewhat in the first half of the 1980s. After reaching a high of $356 million in 1981, sales actually declined in each of the next three years, and did not surpass the 1981 figure until 1986, when $375 million in sales was reported. One obvious reason for this stagnation was a generally sluggish global economy, in which maintenance supplies were easy targets for the cost-cutting efforts of struggling industrial firms. Also, the first-year turnover rate among NCH sales representatives was much higher than usual due to slow sales accompanied by higher gas and car maintenance costs, which are borne by the sales personnel. The size of the sales force was stuck at about 4,000 throughout the first half of the decade.

In 1986 NCH added direct mail, telemarketing, and catalog sales to its arsenal of marketing techniques. Cornerstone Direct was formed for this purpose, offering material handling equipment, first-aid kits, and other industrial supplies. Sales growth returned in the second half of the 1980s, breaking $400 million in 1987 and $500 million in 1988. European operations contributed more and more to the company's sales and income during this period. With sales up and expenses down, NCH's earned income from Europe quadrupled between 1987 and 1989, from $4.8 million to $18.8 million. Another area that expanded significantly in the last few years of the decade was the company's Resource Electronics Division, with the acquisition of three electronic parts distributors between 1988 and 1990.

Sales and income reached new peaks of $677 million and $43 million in 1991, before dropping slightly in 1992. One major cost incurred by the company in 1992 was the restructuring of its Brazilian subsidiary, a downsizing made necessary by the phenomenal rate of inflation and general instability of the Brazilian economy. A new plant was built in Korea in 1992, making it possible to offer a broader range of products in the growing Asian market. Among NCH's acquisitions that year was a line of stainless steel flexible tubing connectors. These new products were marketed under the trade name Aqua-Flo. By the end of fiscal 1992, NCH's plumbing group was offering a total of more than 80,000 different parts. The Resource Electronics group's line had grown to over 40,000 parts by this time as well. The company also expanded its line of retail products, which by this time included Outright brand pet care products, Out! International pet odor eliminators, and Totally Toddler nursery care items. A variety of plumbing and hardware supplies for do-it-your-selfers also became available in retail outlets.

In 1998, NCH agreed to finance the clean-up of the Higgins Disposal Superfund Site, a 38-acre location in Somerset County, New Jersey. The location was a former dumping site for a waste disposal company.

In July 1999, Friendly Systems, an NCH subsidiary, was found guilty in Dallas of selling pesticides for uses not approved by the Environmental Protection Agency. In 1995, a telephone sales representative sold pesticides to the Head Start program of the Rosebud Sioux Tribe in South Dakota. The representative told the center that the pesticide could be used to sanitize the children's toothbrushes. Parents reported that 100 children suffered nosebleeds, fatigue, mouth blisters, joint pain and other symptoms.

=== 2000 to present ===
In 2002 the Levy Family purchased 100% of the public shares of NCH. This ended the company's 37-year history as a publicly traded company.

In August 2011, NCH settled a lawsuit for $1.4 million in California. Salespeople in the El Segundo, California sales office had sued NCH due to its failure to reimburse them for covered business expenses (gasoline, cellphone usage, entertainment expenses).

In March 2014, a civil jury in Harris County, Texas, awarded $11 million in damages to the family of a man kill in a 2011 traffic crash with an NCH tractor trailer. The jury found that NCH was negligent in its training and supervision of its driver.

In September 2016, NCH agreed to pay a fine of $335,342 to the US Federal Government. An investigation from 2011 to 2013 found that NCH China had been bribing Chinese government officials in order to get business. NCH had voluntarily reported the violation to the US Department of Justice.

In mid-2019, NCH sold its Hero Pet Brands business to Manna Pro Products which is part of Morgan Stanley Capital Partners.

In September 2020, NCH sold its Partsmaster division to Lawson Products, Inc. for approximately $35.3 million plus assumption of certain liabilities.
