= Minnesota Forge =

Professional volleyball team in Saint Paul, Minnesota

- Founded: 2025
- League: Major League Volleyball
- Based in: Saint Paul, Minnesota
- Arena: Grand Casino Arena
- General manager: Pedro Mendes

The Minnesota Forge are a women's professional indoor volleyball team based in Saint Paul, Minnesota. The team will begin play in Major League Volleyball in 2027, and will play their home games at Grand Casino Arena.

== History ==
On November 18, 2025, Major League Volleyball announced an expansion team would be coming to Minnesota. Craig Leipold, owner of the Minnesota Wild, was announced as majority owner through his company, Minnesota Sports and Entertainment.

The team's name, logo, and colors, were announced on August 12, 2026.

== Roster ==
Current as of September 12, 2026.

Player	Position	College	Height
(United States) Payton Caffrey	Outside hitter	West Virginia/Florida State	6'0"
(United States) Stephanie Samedy	Opposite hitter	Minnesota	6'2"
(United States) Maddy May	Libero	North Carolina	5'10"
(United States) Jenna Wenaas	Outside hitter	Minnesota/Texas	6'1"
(Canada) Quinn Pelland	Setter	Mount Royal	5'11"
(Germany) Marie Schölzel	Middle blocker		6'3"
(United States) Courtney Schwan	Outside hitter	Washington	6'1"
(Japan) Airi Miyabe	Outside hitter	Minnesota	6'0"
(Spain) Patricia Llabrés	Libero		5'6"
(United States) Alicia Andrew	Middle blocker	Wisconsin/Baylor	6'3"
(United States) Kayla Haneline	Middle blocker	Northern Iowa	6'2"
(United States) Hattie Bray	Middle blocker	Marquette	6'2"
(United States) Emery Herman	Setter	Colorado State/Arizona	6'0"
