= Winnie Johnson-Marquart =

American billionaire and businesswoman

- Born: 1958 or 1959 (age 66–67)
- Spouse: Michael Marquart
- Children: 4
- Parent(s): Samuel Curtis Johnson Jr. Imogene Powers Johnson
- Relatives: Herbert Fisk Johnson III; Helen Johnson-Leipold; S. Curtis Johnson (siblings)

Winnie Johnson-Marquart (born 1958/1959) is an American billionaire heir, and the daughter of Samuel Curtis Johnson Jr. and the great great granddaughter of S. C. Johnson & Son founder Samuel Curtis Johnson Sr.

She graduated from Cornell University in 1981. She has been the president and a trustee of the Johnson Family Foundation but never wanted to partake to the family affairs.

== Family ==
Winnie Johnson-Marquart is married to rock musician Michael Marquart and has a daughter Samantha, who is studio manager at Windmark Recording.
