= Imogene Powers Johnson =

American billionaire (1930–2018)

- Born: September 3, 1930
- Died: March 3, 2018 (aged 87)
- Spouse: Samuel Curtis Johnson Jr.
- Children: Herbert Fisk Johnson III; Helen Johnson-Leipold; S. Curtis Johnson; Winnie Johnson-Marquart

Imogene Powers Johnson (September 3, 1930 – March 3, 2018) was the widow of Samuel Curtis Johnson Jr., who was CEO of S. C. Johnson & Son of Racine, Wisconsin. She was the heir to the cleaning product company SC Johnson, and a billionaire. The Johnsons were major benefactors of Cornell University.

Johnson graduated from Cornell University in 1952 with a Bachelor's degree in mathematics. She served as a board member with the Cornell Lab of Ornithology from 1980 until her death. She was the first Life Member of the administrative board, and the Imogene Powers Johnson Center for Birds and Biodiversity is named after her.

In 1965, alongside Wille Hilpert, Johnson founded The Prairie School, an independent day school, in Wind Point, Wisconsin.

According to Forbes, at the time of her death on March 3, 2018, at the age of 87, she was worth US$3.7 billion.
