= Craig Leipold =

American businessman

- Born: 1952 (age 73–74)
- Occupation: Businessman
- Title: Owner of the Minnesota Wild; Founder and former owner of Nashville Predators
- Spouse: Helen Johnson-Leipold (m. 1987)
- Children: 5

Craig Leipold (born 1952) is an American businessman and owner of the Minnesota Wild of the National Hockey League (NHL). Leipold is majority owner of Minnesota Sports & Entertainment. He previously owned the Nashville Predators.

== Business career ==
Leipold is the founder of Ameritel, a business-to-business telemarketing firm in Neenah, Wisconsin. He formerly owned the Rainfair Company, which made protective footwear. He has also been a director of Gaylord Entertainment Company, owner of the Grand Ole Opry in Nashville, Tennessee.

=== Sports team ownership ===
Leipold was first considered a potential owner or investor in the NBA's Milwaukee Bucks and Sacramento Kings. He attributed this interest to the fact that he knew basketball well. He became interested in ownership of a professional ice hockey franchise because there were more opportunities than in basketball.

Leipold bought an expansion franchise from the NHL in 1997 for $80 million. He sold the Nashville Predators due to rising operating costs and low fan attendance. Leipold claimed more than $70 million in losses during his tenure as owner of the Predators. Initially, he had an agreement to sell the team to Jim Balsillie for $220 million, but he withdrew from the agreement after Balsillie started season ticket advertising for a move of the team to Hamilton, Ontario. The Predators were instead sold to an investor group that included William J. "Boots" Del Biaggio. The final sale price was reported as $193 million. Leipold has gone on record objecting to Balsillie becoming an NHL owner, saying he does not trust Balsillie.

Leipold's purchase of the Minnesota Wild from founding owner Bob Naegele, Jr. was announced on January 10, 2008. His company Minnesota Sports & Entertainment also owns the Wild's AHL affiliate, the Iowa Wild (formerly the Houston Aeros). The company also manages the Grand Casino Arena and the RiverCentre in Saint Paul, Minnesota. In November 2025, it was announced that a women's volleyball franchise would be added to Major League Volleyball and the team would be majority owned by Minnesota Sports & Entertainment. The team will begin competing in 2027 as the Minnesota Frost at Grand Casino Arena.

=== Real estate ===
Leipold became the majority owner of the Saint Paul Hotel in May 2026 along with Ecolab and Securian Financial.

== Personal life ==
Leipold is active in numerous civic and corporate organizations as well as several charities benefiting children. He co-chairs CollegeBound Saint Paul's Fund for the Future, which seeks to raise funding to support opening a college savings account for every baby born in Saint Paul.

Leipold has been named "Sports Person of the Year" by the Nashville Sports Council, "1999 Father of the Year" by the Nashville Father's Day Council, and "Nashvillian of the Year" by Easterseals after the Predators' 1998–99 season.

He and his wife, Helen Johnson-Leipold, have five children and maintain residences in Saint Paul and Racine, Wisconsin. Helen is the daughter of Samuel Curtis Johnson, Jr. of the S. C. Johnson family.

Leipold is a prominent Republican who supported George W. Bush and Mitt Romney. St. Paul's Grand Casino Arena, then known as the Xcel Energy Center, hosted the 2008 Republican National Convention.

Sporting positions
Preceded by Bob Naegele Jr.	Minnesota Wild owner 2008–present	Incumbent
New creation	Nashville Predators owner 1998–2007	Succeeded by David Freeman
