= Michael Marquart =

American musician

Michael Marquart (Mike Marquart)
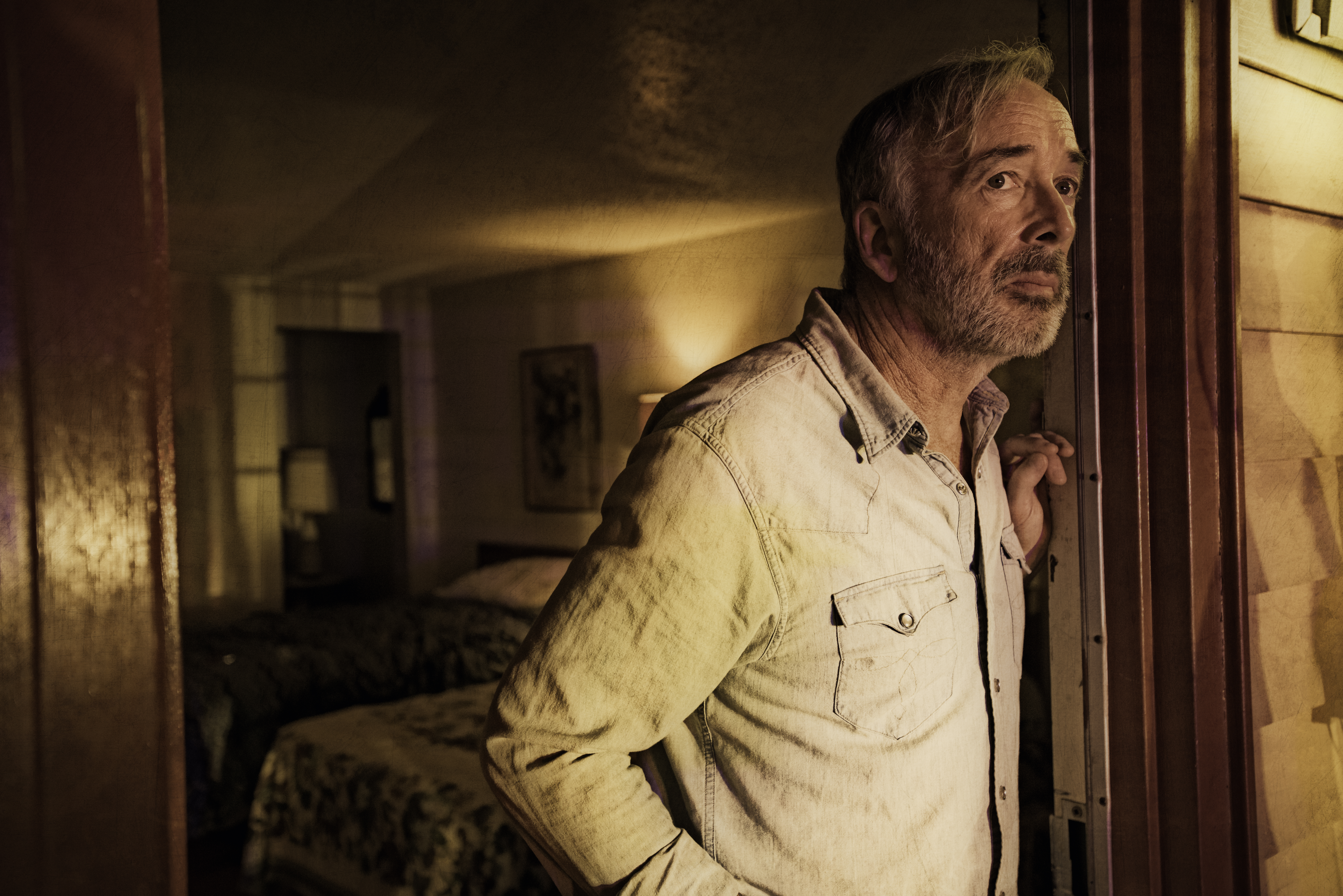

Background information
- Born: 1957 (age 68–69); Fort Atkinson, Wisconsin, United States
- Genres: Rock; fusion; progressive rock; various others
- Occupations: Musician; singer-songwriter; record producer; composer
- Instruments: Vocals; drums; guitar; keyboards
- Years active: 1980s–present
- Label: Windmark
- Member of: A Bad Think
- Formerly of: A Flock of Seagulls; Alias
- Website: abadthink.com

Michael Marquart (also known as Mike Marquart) is an American singer-songwriter, multi-instrumentalist and producer, and founder of the musical project A Bad Think. He founded Windmark Recording recording studios in Virginia Beach and Santa Monica. Marquart's studios have recorded many notable musical artists, including Coldplay, Jeezy, J. Cole, YG, Justin Timberlake, Pharrell, Kanye West, and Kendrick Lamar. In 2021, Marquart sold Windmark Recording to Joie Manda.

As a record producer, Marquart has worked closely with many well-known musicians and producers, including Teddy Riley and The Neptunes (an R&B duo consisting of Chad Hugo and Pharrell Williams). His albums have featured many notable musicians, including Jeremy Stacey, Victor Indrizzo, Fernando Perdomo, Paul Bryan, Greg Leisz, Durga McBroom, and John Philip Shenale.

== Early life and career ==
Marquart grew up in the town of Fort Atkinson, Wisconsin, where a neighbor taught him to play drums. As a teenager, he began playing drums in his first rock band, Wonderhorse. While attending college in Iowa studying music theory, he joined the band Tokyo Rose.

For a brief period in 1989, he played drums for the A Flock of Seagulls, recording a single with the band and supporting a 3-week tour. The following year, he recorded four songs with Canadian supergroup Alias. Wanting to pursue his own original music and spend more time with his family, Marquart moved to Virginia Beach, Virginia.

== Windmark Recording ==
Marquart co-founded Windmark Recording, a Virginia Beach recording studio, with concert promoter Bill Reid, who later exited the partnership. During the late 1990s and early 2000s, the studio served as an important recording space for The Neptunes production duo of Pharrell Williams and Chad Hugo, as well as mixing engineer Serban Ghenea, working on projects including Britney Spears' Britney (2001), Justin Timberlake's debut solo album, Justified (2002), and Beyoncé's debut solo single, "Work It Out". In 2005, Marquart sold the Virginia Beach studio to the Neptunes.

In 2015, Marquart bought Jimmy Jam and Terry Lewis' Flyte Tyme West studio complex in Santa Monica, California to create a new Windmark Recording, with his daughter Samantha managing the studio and his son Mikey helping with operations. Windmark's Santa Monica studio recorded many notable musical artists, including Coldplay, Jeezy, J. Cole, YG, Kanye West, and Kendrick Lamar. ^{]} In 2021, Marquart sold Windmark Recording to music executive and Encore Recordings founder Joie Manda.

== A Bad Think ==
In the mid 2000s, Marquart founded the musical project A Bad Think. The project's self-titled debut album was released in 2006, and earned a nomination for Best Rock Album of the Year at the Hollywood Music Awards. Marquart released the second A Bad Think album, Simple Rhymes, in 2009 followed by Sara Lee (2010), Medicine (2012), Sleep (2014), and Don't Forget Us (2015).

A Bad Think's seventh studio album, released in 2016, is The Tragic End of a Dreamer, which blends diverse musical genres ranging from ambient to Southern rock, folk, and New Age music. The album features Paul Bryan (bass), Greg Leisz (pedal steel guitar), Durga McBroom (singer), and John Philip Shenale (composer).

In 2016, Marquart formed the studio duo Myja with singer and guitarist Jacob Bunton, a member of the bands Lynam and Adler, the latter with drummer Steven Adler. The duo's self-titled album, Myja, was released by Windmark Recordings on January 12, 2018. Bunton said the two shared an approach to songwriting and to recording organically, described Myja as a studio project that had never played live, and said Marquart was what set it apart from his other bands.

The Savior, released in April 2019, includes the single "Feel Me." In November 2019, the album received a Grammy nomination for Best Immersive Audio Album. The release of Lifelike (2021) was accompanied by a 20-minute documentary, Lifelike: The Making of An Album in Dolby Atmos.

Marquart and Dave Way recorded Lifelike with ambisonic and binaural microphones for an eventual Dolby Atmos mix, and Marquart said he "wanted to be on the front end" of the format. Bob Clearmountain mixed the album in stereo and 5.1 surround, while Way and Steve Genewick created a separate Atmos mix.

Marquart has frequently collaborated with filmmaker Derrick Borte, who directed the Lifelike documentary and many of A Bad Think's music videos. In a 2024 segment of Curate 757, a local arts program from WHRO Public Media, Borte said the two had met almost 15 years earlier, and Marquart recalled "Overstay" as the first video Borte directed for him. A Bad Think's song "Stay On", from Lifelike, is used in Borte's 2026 film The Get Out.

A Bad Think's tenth studio album, X, was released August 19, 2022 in Dolby Atmos. Produced by Dave Way, X was the project's first release mixed by Bob Clearmountain in Dolby Atmos and stereo. In 2023, Marquart collaborated with drummer Matt Chamberlain, bass player Dan Rothchild, guitarist Kirk Hellie, keyboardist Phil Shenale and other musicians to record Short St.. Marquart, Clearmountain, and Way reunited to create, mix and produce the album in Dolby Atmos and stereo.

On May 10, 2024, Marquart released A Bad Think's album, Cottonwood, in Dolby Atmos on all streaming platforms and ImmersiveAudioAlbum.com. A Bad Think's thirteenth studio album, Watch Your Mind, was released on March 7, 2025. Marquart produced the ten-track album, and Way created its immersive mixes.

Season 14, A Bad Think's fourteenth studio album, was released in April 2026. It is a concept album; Way mixed it in Dolby Atmos, and Grammy-winning mastering engineer Michael Romanowski mastered the immersive version. Its closing track, "The Last Mile", became the basis for a short film/music video starring Marquart, produced and directed by Borte, with cinematography by Eric Hurt. As of October 2026, the video had surpassed 1.1 million views on YouTube.

== Discography ==
A Bad Think

- Screwtop Wine (1995)
- A Bad Think (2006)
- Simple Rhymes (2009)
- Sara Lee (2010)
- Medicine (2012)
- Sleep (2014)
- Don't Forget Us (2015)
- The Tragic End of a Dreamer (2016)
- The Savior (2019)
- Lifelike (2021)
- X (2022)
- Short St. (2023)
- Cottonwood (2024)
- Watch Your Mind (2025)
- Season 14 (2026)

With Myja

- Myja (2018)

Solo

- Screwtop Wine (1995)

== Personal life ==
Marquart is married to Winnie Johnson-Marquart. Together, they have a son and a daughter, Samantha, with whom Marquart co-founded Windmark Recording's Santa Monica location in 2015. Marquart currently spends half his time living and working in Los Angeles, California, and the other half in Virginia Beach, Virginia.

His home studio in Malibu, California is called "The Barn". Constructed using wood salvaged from the Hollywood Bowl, originally constructed in the 1920s, The Barn was recognized with the Outstanding Creative Achievement – Studio Design Project award at the 33rd NAMM TEC Awards.

== See also ==
- Winnie Johnson-Marquart
