= Kayla Haneline =

American volleyball player (born 1994)

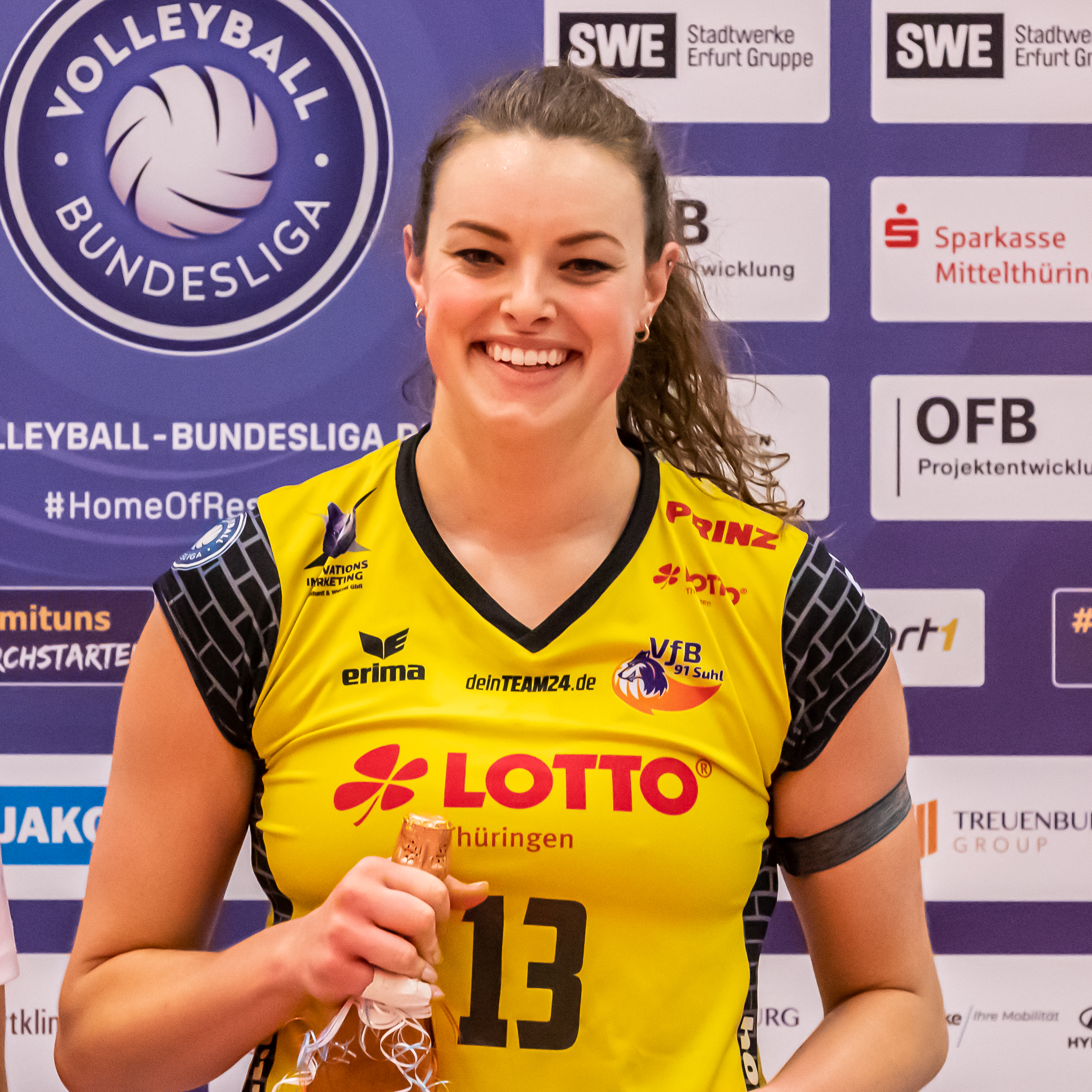
- Haneline in 2021

Personal information
- Born: July 4, 1994 (age 32)
- Hometown: Plattsmouth, Nebraska, U.S.
- Height: 6 ft 2 in (188 cm)
- Education: Northern Iowa

Volleyball information
- Position: Middle blocker
- Current club: Minnesota Forge

Career
| Years | Teams |
|---|---|
| 2017-2018 | (Hungary) Vasas Óbuda Budapest |
| 2018-2019 | (Finland) LP Kangasala |
| 2019-2020 | (Finland) LP Viesti Salo |
| 2020-2021 | (Germany) Rote Raben Vilsbiburg |
| 2021-2022 | (Germany) VfB Suhl Lotto Thuringia |
| 2022-2023 | (Germany) Dresdner SC |
| 2023-2024 | (Germany) Allianz MTV Stuttgart |
| 2024-2025 | (United States) LOVB Atlanta |
| 2027 | (United States) Minnesota Forge |

Kayla Haneline (born July 4, 1994) is an American volleyball player.

== Career ==
From 2012 to 2016, she attended the University of Northern Iowa and played on the varsity Panthers. She joined the Hungarian club Vasas Óbuda Budapest in 2017. After that she went to Finland where she played for LP Kangasala in the 2018/19 season. She then moved within the league to LP Viesti Salo.

In 2020 she moved to the German Bundesliga club Rote Raben Vilsbiburg; she moved to VfB Suhl Lotto Thuringia for the 2021/22 season; and she signed with Dresdner SC for the 2022–23 season.

In June 2026, Haneline signed to the Minnesota Forge of Major League Volleyball to play in the team's inaugural season.
