= The Prairie School =

The Prairie School may refer to:

- Prairie School, a late 19th and early 20th-century architectural style
- The Prairie School (Wind Point, Wisconsin), a private Pre-K–12 school
