= S. Curtis Johnson =

American businessman

- Education: Cornell University; Kellogg School of Management
- Occupation: Former chairman of Diversey, Inc.
- Spouse: Tracie Stier-Johnson (2001–2016)
- Children: 4
- Parent(s): Samuel Curtis Johnson Jr. Imogene Powers Johnson
- Relatives: Herbert Fisk Johnson III; Helen Johnson-Leipold; Winnie Johnson-Marquart (siblings)

S. Curtis "Curt" Johnson is an American businessman. Johnson is the son of Samuel Curtis Johnson Jr. and Imogene Powers Johnson, and is the great-great-grandson of Samuel Curtis Johnson Sr., founder of S. C. Johnson & Son. The 2013 Forbes 400 list of richest persons in the world placed him at 166 with a net worth of $3 billion.

== Career ==
Johnson was chairman of Diversey until he resigned his position in early 2011, citing personal reasons. His sister Helen Johnson-Leipold succeeded him at the firm.

== Criminal conviction ==
In March 2011, Johnson was charged in Racine County Circuit Court with sexually assaulting his step-daughter 15 to 20 times over a period of three years, starting when she was 12 years old. Johnson repeatedly touched his stepdaughter on the breasts, buttocks and vaginal area and asked if he could have sex with her.

In June 2014, he pleaded guilty to two misdemeanors. The victim had moved to North Carolina, wanted the case dismissed, and fought efforts to make her appear and testify. Johnson was sentenced to four months in jail with Huber privileges after 60 days and fined $6,000. He was not required to register as a sex offender.

== Political donations ==
Johnson gave the Republican National Committee (RNC) $15,000 in June 2009. In 2008, he donated $1,000 to the RNC. He gave a total of $2,000 to Representative Paul Ryan, in four separate donations. The S.C. Johnson and Sons political action committee (PAC) donated $99,700 in 2010 alone. In 2008 it donated $94,125, and similar amounts in previous years.
