= Johnson Financial Group =

American banking company

Johnson Financial Group, Inc.
- Formerly: Johnson International, Inc.
- Company type: Private
- Industry: Banking
- Founded: 1970; 56 years ago in Racine, Wisconsin, U.S.
- Number of employees: 900
- Website: https://www.johnsonfinancialgroup.com/

Johnson Financial Group, Inc (est. in 1970) is the holding company of Johnson Bank and Johnson Wealth. Helen Johnson-Leipold, one of Samuel Curtis Johnson Jr.'s four children, is chairperson of the company.

== History ==
The company was founded in 1970 but wasn't incorporated until 1989 and has grown from a single bank holding company to a global organization providing a full range of financial services to businesses and individuals.

Johnson Financial Group, Inc. was formerly known as Johnson International, Inc. and changed its name to Johnson Financial Group, Inc. in January 2002. The company was incorporated in 1989 and is based in Racine, Wisconsin. It has banking locations in Wisconsin and Minnesota.

== Services ==
Johnson Financial Group, Inc. provides banking and wealth solutions in Wisconsin. It offers personal and private banking solutions, individual retirement accounts, personal loans, mortgage, and home equity solutions, business banking solutions, lending solutions that include commercial banking. In addition, it offers financial planning, trustee, estate administration, portfolio management, brokerage and retirement planning services.

== Subsidiaries ==
=== Selected domestic holdings ===
- Johnson Bank
- Johnson Wealth
