= Grand Casino Arena =

Arena in Saint Paul, Minnesota, US

- The X

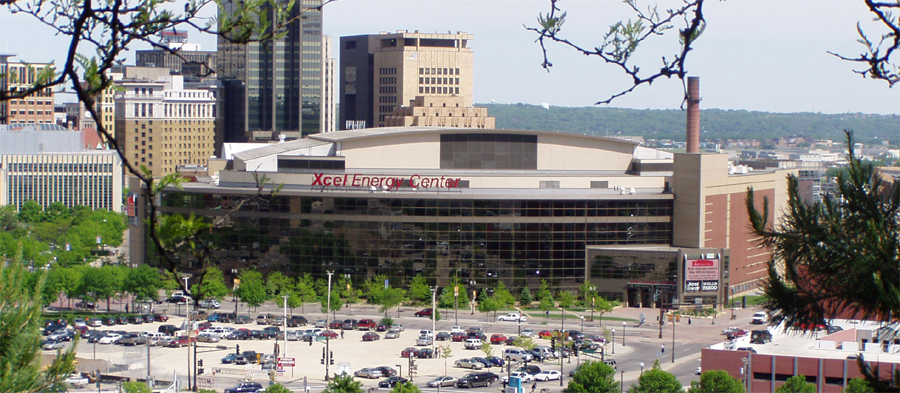
- Grand Casino Arena (then Xcel Energy Center) in 2006

- Location in Minnesota Location in the United States
- Former names: Xcel Energy Center (2000–2025)
- Address: 199 Kellogg Boulevard West
- Location: Saint Paul, Minnesota, U.S.
- Coordinates: 44°56′41″N 93°6′4″W
- Owner: City of Saint Paul
- Operator: Minnesota Sports & Entertainment
- Capacity: Ice hockey: 18,064 (2000–2012); 17,954 (2012–present); Concerts: End Stage 12,999; Center Stage 20,554
- Surface: Multi-surface
- Field size: 650,000 sq ft (60,000 m^{2})
- Public transit: Green Line at Central Station; Metro Transit Route 54

Construction
- Groundbreaking: June 23, 1998
- Opened: September 29, 2000
- Cost: US$170 million
- Architect: HOK Sport (now Populous)
- Project managers: Project Management Consultants, LLC.
- Structural engineer: Geiger Engineers PC
- Services engineer: M-E Engineers. Inc.
- General contractor: Mortenson/Thor

Tenants
- Minnesota Wild (NHL) (2000–present); Minnesota Swarm (NLL) (2005–2015); Minnesota Lynx (WNBA) (2017); Minnesota Frost (PWHL) (2024–present); Minnesota Forge (MLV) (2027–future)

Website
- grandcasinoarena.com

Grand Casino Arena (formerly Xcel Energy Center) is a multipurpose arena in Saint Paul, Minnesota, United States. It was completed in 2000 and often called "The X" by fans. With an official capacity of 17,954, the arena has four spectator levels: one suite level and three for general seating. The building is home to the NHL's Minnesota Wild, the Minnesota Frost of the PWHL, and future Minnesota Forge of Major League Volleyball.

The arena is owned by the city of Saint Paul and operated by the Wild's parent company, Minnesota Sports & Entertainment. It is on the same block of downtown St. Paul as the RiverCentre convention facility, the Roy Wilkins Auditorium, and the Ordway Center for the Performing Arts, and shares a single indoor access area with the RiverCentre and Roy Wilkins Auditorium.

== History ==
Former logo as Xcel Energy Center

The arena opened on September 29, 2000. It was built on the site of the demolished St. Paul Civic Center. The push for a new arena in Saint Paul grew after the National Hockey League's Minnesota North Stars moved to Dallas. Saint Paul courted the Hartford Whalers and Winnipeg Jets under Mayor Norm Coleman, but the Civic Center was an obstacle to both deals. In order to get an NHL expansion team, Saint Paul needed to build a new arena. After several failed attempts to get funding, the state funded the project in April 1998. It gave Saint Paul a no-interest loan of $65 million for the $130 million project, though it forgave $17 million of that in exchange for having high school sports championships played at the arena. The naming rights were initially sold to Minnesota-based Xcel Energy.

The arena hosted the Vote for Change Tour on October 5, 2004, featuring performances by Bright Eyes, R.E.M. and Bruce Springsteen & The E Street Band (with special guest John Fogerty and unannounced guest Neil Young).

In 2006, the Twin Cities were selected as the hosting metropolis for the 2008 Republican National Convention, and the arena was chosen as the main venue. The convention was held there on September 1–4, 2008. The manager of the Xcel Energy Center at the time was Minnesota Sports & Entertainment whose owner Craig Leipold is also the owner of the Minnesota Wild and a prominent Republican and supporter of George W. Bush and Mitt Romney.

The 10 millionth person passed through its gates on July 3, 2007.

In 2010, ESPN magazine listed a Minnesota Wild game at Xcel Energy Center as the third-best stadium experience in North America.

In December 2023, Saint Paul city officials spoke on the condition of the venue, stating that it was "showing its age", and said needed renovations could cost "several hundred million [dollars]....based on similar renovations". The project would focus on modernizing the facility to meet demands of newer generations of visitors.

In April 2025, it was announced that Xcel Energy Center would be renamed before the start of the 2025–26 NHL season after 25 years, but that the company would still remain a partner of the team.

On June 30, 2025, the Wild and the NHL announced a new naming rights deal with the Mille Lacs Band of Ojibwe—which owns and operates Grand Casino Hinckley and Grand Casino Mille Lacs. The arena was renamed Grand Casino Arena on September 3, 2025.

== Features ==
The concourse areas contain hockey jerseys from every Minnesota high school on the walls, reflecting the "State of Hockey". Surrounding the arena at all four corners are "crow's nests". One features an organ and is played during Wild games. The second features a lighthouse that houses a foghorn that is blasted when the team takes the ice before games, for all Wild and Frost goals, and after a victory. The third is used for the Wild's disc jockey. The fourth provides an additional stage for various uses.

Before it opened, the arena installed an integrated scoring, video, information and advertising display system by Daktronics. The system includes a large LED circular, center-hung scoreboard with multiple displays, nearly 1,100 feet (340 m) of ribbon display technology mounted on the fascia and large video displays outside the facility. The center ice display was replaced in the summer of 2014. Of the 10 LED screens, the largest measures 37.5 feet (11.4 m) wide by 19 feet (5.8 m) high. In 2015 the arena began replacing every seat in the building with cushioned seating. This was finished by early 2016.

== Attendance records ==
- January 6, 2024: 13,316 fans attended the Minnesota Frost's Professional Women's Hockey League home debut, setting a new record for the largest crowd to attend a professional women's hockey game. The previous record had been set only five days earlier at a sold-out PWHL game in Ottawa, Canada.
- March 6, 2015: 21,609 fans attended the 2015 State Boys' Hockey Tournament Class AA semifinals at Xcel Energy Center, setting a new record for the largest crowd to ever attend an indoor hockey game in the state of Minnesota.
- March 9, 2012: The Minnesota State High School League Boys' hockey tournament again set a new attendance record during the 2012 AA semifinal session. Hill-Murray and Moorhead played in the first game followed by Benilde St-Margaret's and Lakeville South in front of a crowd of 19,893.
- March 8, 2008: The Minnesota State High School League Boys' hockey tournament set a new attendance record during the AA semifinal session. Edina and Benilde-St. Margaret's played in the first game followed by Roseau and Hill-Murray in front of a crowd of 19,559.
- February 8, 2004: The NHL All-Star Game set a record for attendance at a hockey game in Minnesota at 19,434.
- The record attendance for a Wild game was set May 6, 2014, at 19,416, against the Chicago Blackhawks.
- On October 28, 2003, Shania Twain set the arena's single-night concert attendance record of 20,554.
- On March 17, 2007, 19,463 spectators watched the final game of the WCHA Final Five tournament, the largest crowd ever for an indoor United States college ice hockey game (i.e. not including games held in football stadiums such as the Cold War).
- On January 19, 2013, 19,298 fans watched the Wild defeat the Colorado Avalanche in the first game after the shortened 2012–13 season. It also marked the debuts of signees Zach Parise and Ryan Suter.
- Every Wild game at the Xcel Energy Center sold out until October 16, 2010, totaling 400 consecutive home games.
- Prince and Taylor Swift hold the record for the most consecutive sold-out shows at three.

== Sustainability efforts ==
The campus of Grand Casino Arena, Saint Paul RiverCentre, and The Roy Wilkins Auditorium has three world-class certifications:

- Green Globes Certification – November 2017
- LEED Platinum Certification – September 2019
- Event Industry Council (EIC) Sustainable Event Standards (SES) – Gold Certification – November 2020

The Grand Casino Arena and Saint Paul RiverCentre campus is the world's first complex to receive all three of those certifications. The road to achieving them took several years. Some of the steps taken to achieve these awards are:

- 60% of all waste is recycled
- 40% of staff commute by bus, bike, carpool or an efficient vehicle
- 90% of cleaning products meet green standards

In addition to the efforts made by staff, Grand Casino Arena has partnered with the NHL to join Change the Course, a national initiative promoting water conservation and restoration. To highlight its achievements, the Grand Casino Arena produced Exceptionally Green: Minnesota Wild, Saint Paul RiverCentre and Xcel Energy Center.

== Sports ==
Grand Casino Arena is a hub for sports events in the Midwest. In 2004, ESPN named the arena the best overall sports venue in the U.S. It hosted the NCAA Frozen Four tournament in 2002, 2011, 2018, and 2024. The National Lacrosse League's Minnesota Swarm played in the arena from January 2005 until they moved to Georgia in 2015. The Minnesota Lynx of the WNBA used Xcel Energy Center during the 2016 WNBA Playoffs and the 2017 WNBA season as their home arena, Minneapolis's Target Center, was undergoing renovation. As of 2018, it is host venue of the NCHC Frozen Faceoff. The venue formerly hosted the Big Ten Men's Ice Hockey Tournament, alternating with Joe Louis Arena in Detroit. The venue is used by the Minnesota State High School League (MSHSL) for its Girls Volleyball State Tournament, Wrestling State Tournament, and the Boys and Girls Hockey State Tournaments.

The Minnesota Wild played their first game at the arena on October 11, 2000, against the Philadelphia Flyers. Their first win at the arena came on October 18, 2000, when they defeated the Tampa Bay Lightning 6–5. The Wild's first playoff game at the arena was on April 14, 2003. In that game, the Wild suffered a 3–0 loss to the Colorado Avalanche. On April 21, 2003, the Wild won their first playoff game 3–2 on an overtime game-winner by Richard Park. On April 26, 2015, the Wild clinched a playoff series at the arena for the first time, defeating the St. Louis Blues 4–1 in game six of the Western Conference Quarterfinals.

In 2023, it was announced that the Minnesota Frost of the Professional Women's Hockey League would be based out of the arena. The team hosted its inaugural home game on January 6, 2023—a 3–0 shutout victory over the Montréal Victoire. Grace Zumwinkle scored the first home goal for the Frost, and went on to record a hat-trick; Maddie Rooney recorded the shutout. With more than 13,000 fans in attendance, the game set a new record for attendance at a professional women's hockey game.

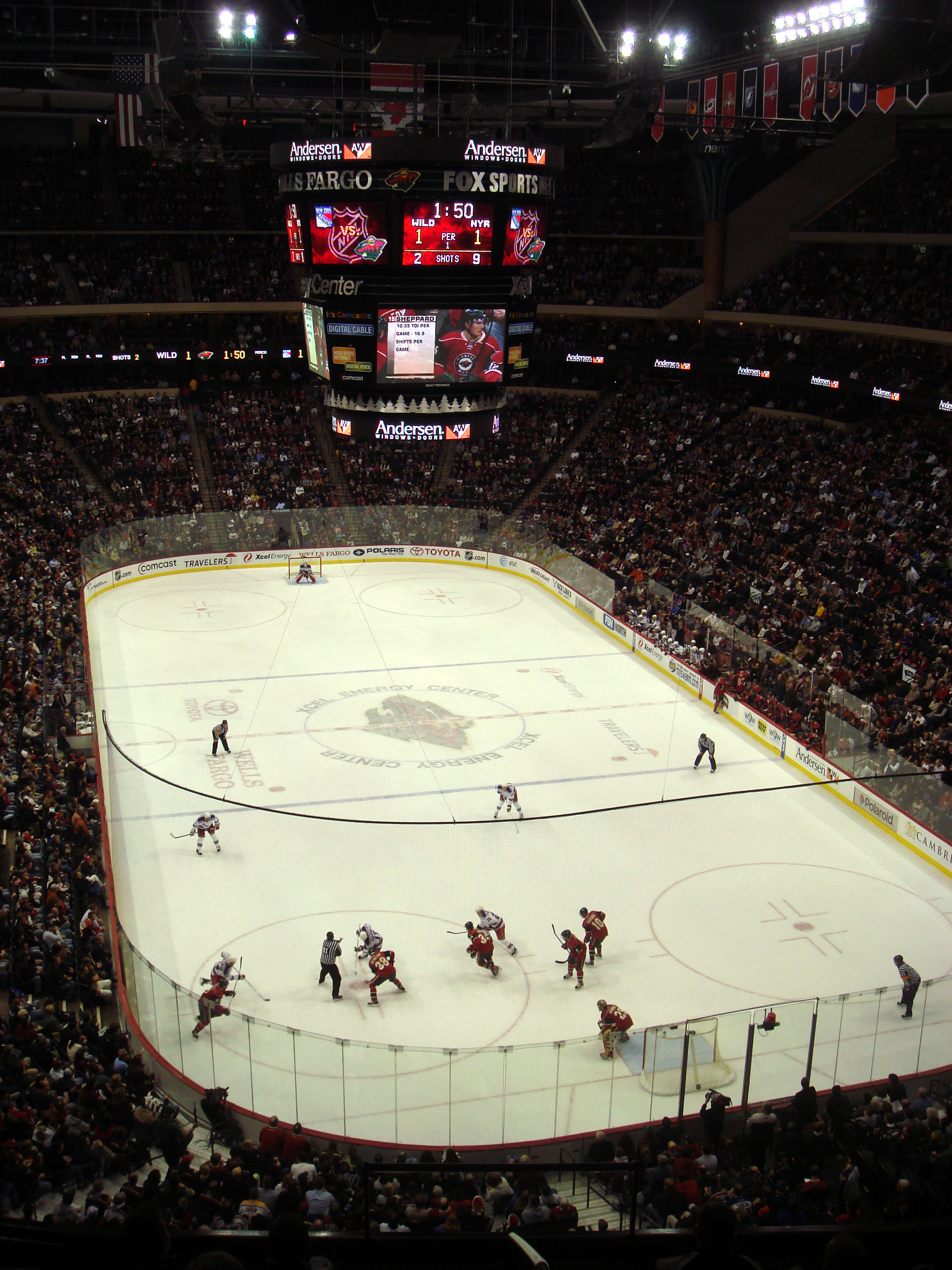
Interior during a Minnesota Wild game

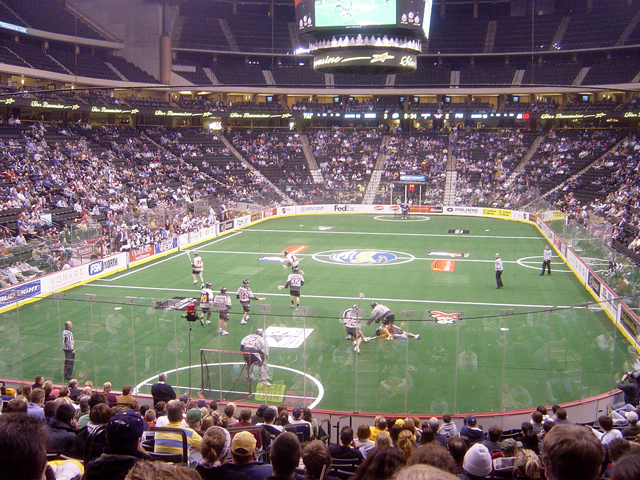
Interior during a Minnesota Swarm lacrosse game

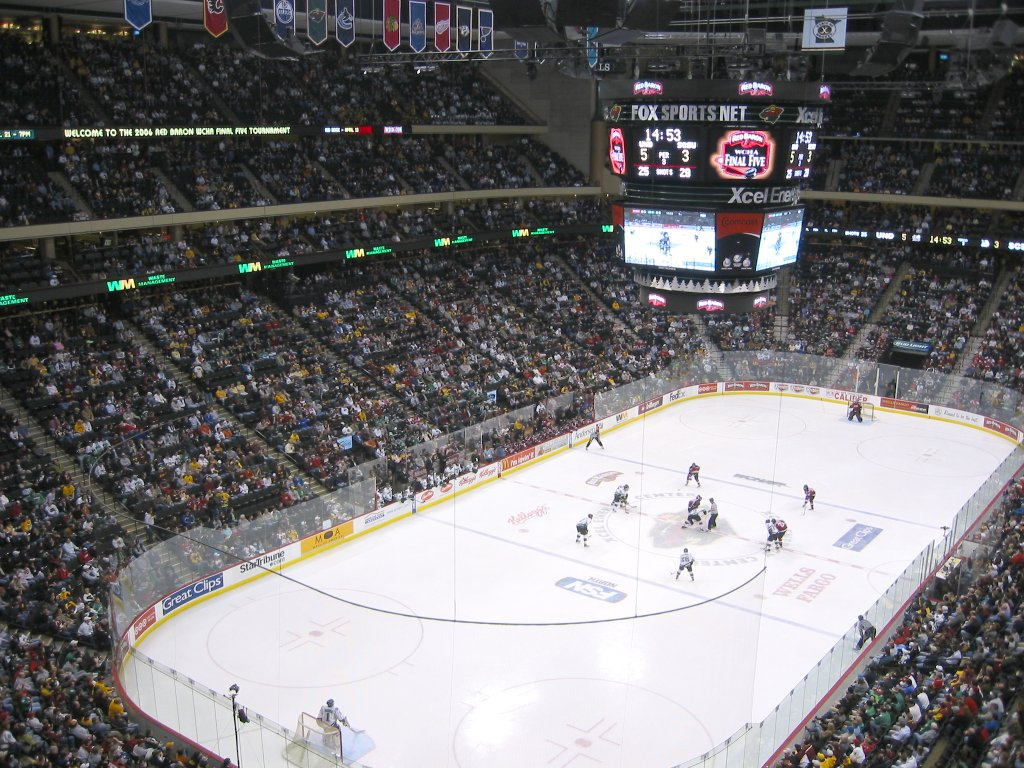
Interior during the 2006 WCHA Final Five Championship

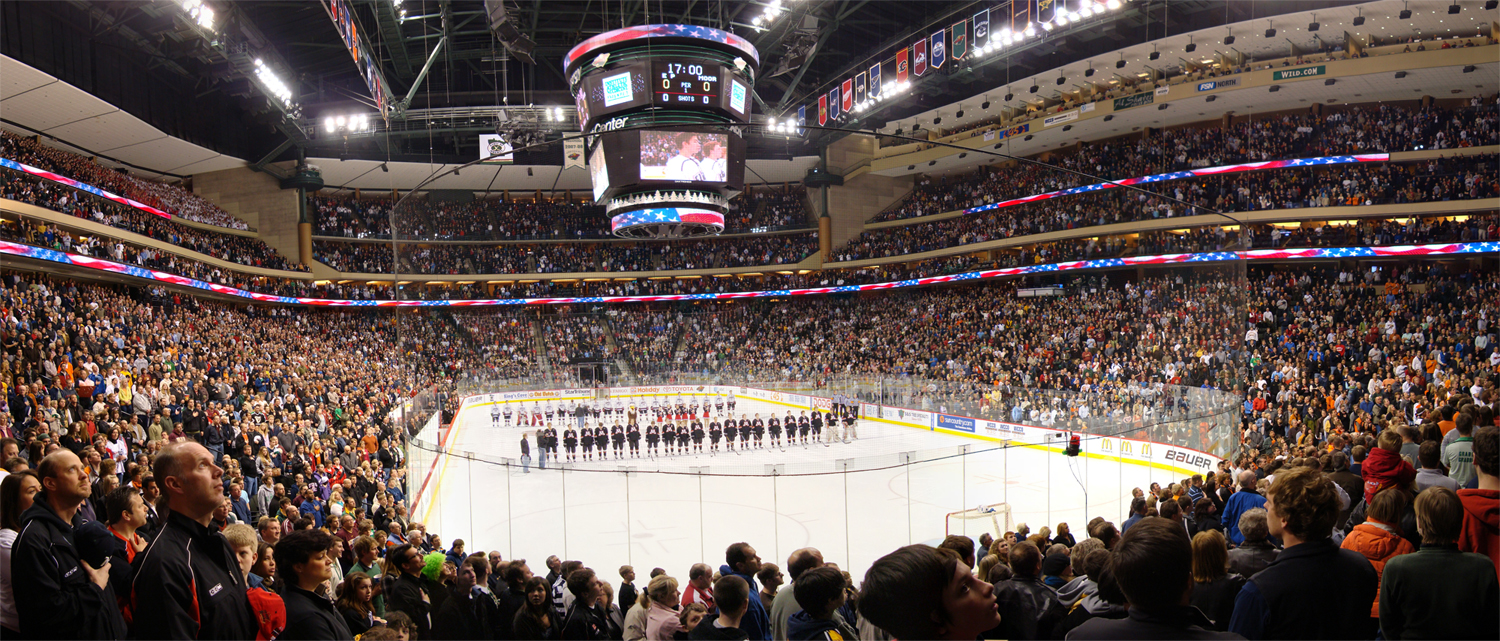
Interior prior to the 2009 Boys' High School Championship game between Eden Prairie and Moorhead

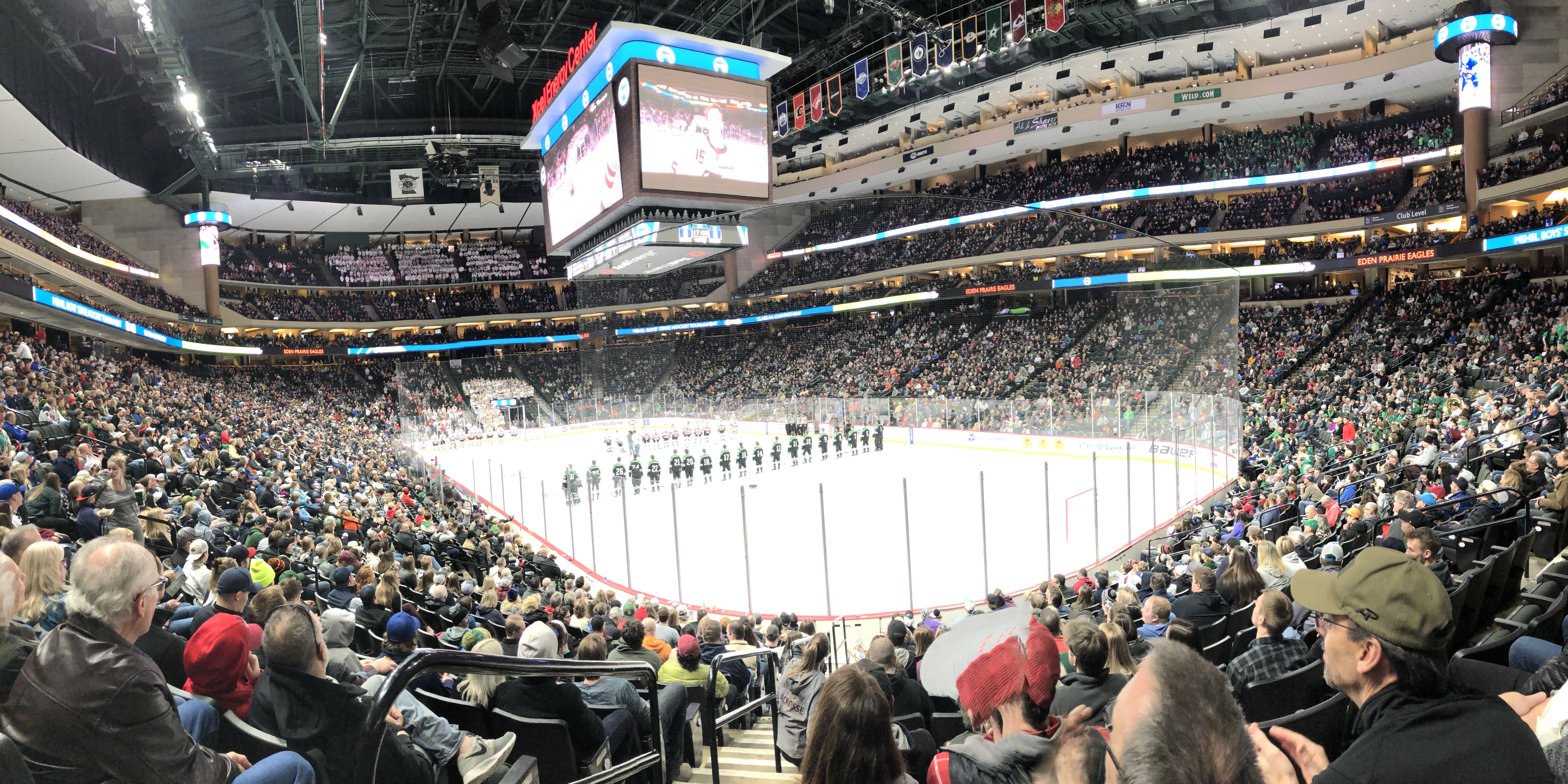
Interior before the 2020 Minnesota State High School League Boys' Hockey AA Championship game between Eden Prairie and Hill Murray

== Concerts ==
Various music artists have held concerts at the arena since its opening in 2000. Some of these include Taylor Swift, Olivia Rodrigo, Lady Gaga, Katy Perry, Imagine Dragons, Elton John, Pink, Madonna, Pentatonix, Kelly Clarkson, Ariana Grande, Post Malone, Beyoncé, Shania Twain, Iron Maiden, and Bruno Mars.

== Funding ==
In 1998, the state made a $65 million interest-free loan toward construction of the $130 million arena, $17 million of which was forgiven when the team agreed to allow amateur and public events. That left a loan of $48 million.

In 2013, the state legislature passed an omnibus jobs, housing and commerce bill that included forgiveness of the remaining $32.7 million loan to Xcel Energy Center.

Under the terms of the forgiveness deal in this bill, St. Paul's annual loan payment was reduced by $500,000 in 2014 and again in 2015. The balance of the loan was forgiven in 2016. The city still owes $56.8 million in bonds on the arena, of the $72.7 million it borrowed in 1998.

In 2025, the Minnesota Wild and city of St. Paul sought a $394 million appropriation from the Minnesota Legislature to support a large-scale, $770 million renovation project for the entire complex, which includes the RiverCentre and Roy Wilkins Auditorium. These plans were later reduced to only the arena, thus reducing the total construction cost and request from the state down to $488 million and $50 million, respectively.

== See also ==
- List of indoor arenas by capacity
- List of indoor arenas in the United States

Events and tenants
Preceded by First Arena	Home of the Minnesota Wild; 2000 – present	Succeeded by Current
Preceded by First Arena	Home of the PWHL Minnesota; 2024 – present	Succeeded by Current
Preceded by Pepsi Arena; Albany, New York	Host of the Frozen Four; 2002	Succeeded by HSBC Arena; Buffalo, New York
Preceded by Office Depot Center	Host of the NHL All-Star Game; 2004	Succeeded by American Airlines Center
Preceded by First Arena	Home of the Minnesota Swarm; 2005–2015	Succeeded by Arena at Gwinnett Center
Preceded by Ford Field; Detroit	Host of the Frozen Four; 2011	Succeeded by Tampa Bay Times Forum; Tampa, Florida
