= Solenis =

American manufacturer of specialty chemicals

- Company type: Private
- Industry: Manufacturing and chemical distribution
- Predecessor: Ashland Water Technologies; Hercules Inc.; BetzDearborn
- Founded: 2014
- Headquarters: Wilmington, Delaware, U.S.
- Key people: John E. Panichella, Chief Executive Officer and President
- Products: Specialty chemicals, and services
- Revenue: US$4 billion
- Owner: Platinum Equity
- Number of employees: 6000 (January 2021)
- Website: solenis.com

Solenis, formerly Ashland Water Technologies, is an American manufacturer of specialty chemicals for the pulp, paper, oil and gas, chemical processing, mining, biorefining, power and municipal markets. Headquartered in Wilmington, Delaware, in the United States, the company operates 71 manufacturing facilities located around the globe in 130 countries and more than 15,000 employees. Its product portfolio includes a variety of process, functional and water treatment chemistries, as well as monitoring and control systems.

== History ==
- March 2023, Solenis announced the acquisition of Diversey Holdings for $4.6 Billion, and expects the merger to be completed in the second half of 2023.
- November 2021 : BASF and Clayton, Dubilier & Rice sold Solenis for $5.25 billion to Platinum Equity.
- 2021 : Platinum Equity announced its intent to acquire Solenis for $5.25 billion.
- 2019 : Solenis merged with BASF's Paper and Water Chemicals business with the merged entity to operate under the Solenis brand.
- 2014–Present: Ashland Water Technologies was bought by private investment firm Clayton, Dubilier & Rice (CD&R) from Ashland Inc. on July 31, 2014, and rebranded as Solenis.
- 2008-2014: Ashland purchased Hercules Inc. in 2008 for $2.6 billion to double earnings and gain chemicals used in papermaking, water treatment and construction.
- 1998-2008: Hercules Inc. bought BetzDearborn in 1998 for $2.4 billion in an effort to grow the company in the specialty-chemicals market.
- 1996-1998: BetzDearborn, Inc. was formed and later sold to Hercules Inc.
- 1957-1996: Betz Laboratories, Inc., was formed, with services developing in the paper and pulp-processing industries. In 1996 Betz Laboratories acquired Dearborn, and BetzDearborn, Inc., was formed.
- 1925-1957: In Philadelphia, William H. and L. Drew Betz formed a partnership to sell their product, K-Gel. It was used to treat and purify water in industrial boilers. Its basic ingredient was sodium alginate, extracted from kelp. William and Drew's partnership dissolved in 1957 which allowed for the formation of Betz Laboratories.
- 1887-1996: Chicago chemists, William H. Edgar and Frank E. Mariner, formed a partnership that prepared chemical compounds for removing and preventing scales in boilers. The following year, Edgar founded Dearborn Drug and Chemical Works, which was later sold to Betz Laboratories, Inc. in 1996.
- 1882-1998: Hercules Inc. was established by gunpowder manufacturers DuPont and Laflin & Rand Powder Company. Hercules diversified into chemicals and abandoned the explosives business in the 1950s and 1960s. The company later expanded into water process chemicals with the purchase of BetzDearborn in 1998.

== Awards ==
=== Soyad Adhesives Presidential Green Chemistry Challenge Award ===
Soy-based adhesives are often used in the manufacturing of wood products such as plywood and medium density fiberboard, especially when environmental concerns for petrochemical-based resins are considered. As a result, Solenis developed a completely formulated soy adhesive for use in wood composites, which offers furniture manufacturers and consumers a safer alternative. Solenis' line of Soyad adhesives contains no formaldehyde and low volatile organic compounds (VOCs). Typical interior wood products include urea formaldehyde (UF) in their adhesives. Over time, UF releases free formaldehyde into the air in a carcinogenic gaseous form, which can be inhaled by humans. Following legislation enacted to reduce formaldehyde emissions, the California Air Resources Board (CARB) adopted the United States' strictest emissions standards. Soyad adhesives meet both CARB Phase 2 standards and Leadership in Energy and Environmental Design (LEED) criteria. As a result of this product development, Solenis (operating as Ashland Water Technologies at the time) was jointly awarded the U.S. Environmental Protection Agency's Presidential Green Chemistry Challenge Award along with Columbia Forest Products and Kaichang Li, Ph.D., of Oregon State University.

=== Biobond. 2013 Breakthrough Technology of the Year ===
The Biobond. Improving the Sustainability of Paper Program is a program that improves sustainability and productivity for manufacturers of recycled paperboard. Biobond earned Solenis (operating as Ashland Water Technologies at the time) the 2013 Breakthrough Technology of the Year award from Pulp & Paper International. The announcement was made during RISI's Global Outlook Conference held in December 2013 in Dubai.

=== ABTCP Best Chemical Supplier of the Year ===
On October 9, 2013, Solenis (operating as Ashland Water Technologies at the time) was honored as Best Chemical Supplier of the Year for the Pulp and Paper segment by the Brazilian Pulp & Paper Association (ABTCP). This was the second consecutive year that Solenis received the award.

== Business ==
- Solenis is a specialized company which works in the oil and gas, paper-making, mining, chemical processing, and power marketing sectors.
- Currently, the company has 6,300 employees from 118 countries.
- Solenis has research centers located in Wilmington, Delaware, as well as in Krefeld, Germany.
- The company also has Customer Application laboratories located in Wilmington, Delaware; Barendrecht, the Netherlands; Krefeld, Germany; Shanghai, China; and Leme, Brazil.
- Solenis is not only a chemical supplier; they also help customers face challenges such as environmental impacts and assets. For example, to reduce the amount of chemical and water consumption, they provide a variety of products and options. For over 80 years Solenis has a profolio which includes a multitude of cost-effective products that improve pulping efficiency and pulp quality, including cooking aids, washing aids, pitch and scale control agents, brown stock defoamers and specialty programs. Taken together, these solutions enable pulp mills to enhance pulp performance, reduce organic and inorganic carryover and control a number of common problems that negatively affect productivity, pulp quality and chemical and energy use.
- Markets in which Solenis targets include: biorefining, chemical processing, industrial water, mining and mineral processing, municipal, oil and gas, packing paper and board, power generation, printing and writing paper, pulp, tissue and towel and specialties and wood adhesives.
