= Samuel Curtis Johnson Jr. =

American businessman (1928–2004)

- Born: March 2, 1928; Racine, Wisconsin, U.S.
- Died: May 22, 2004 (aged 76); Racine, Wisconsin, U.S.
- Education: Cornell University (BA); Harvard University (MBA)
- Occupation: Businessman
- Spouse: Imogene Powers Johnson
- Children: Herbert Fisk Johnson III, Helen Johnson-Leipold, S. Curtis Johnson, Winnie Johnson-Marquart
- Parent(s): Herbert Fisk Johnson Jr. Gertrude Brauner Johnson

Samuel Curtis Johnson Jr. (March 2, 1928 – May 22, 2004) was an American businessman. He was the fourth generation of his family to lead S. C. Johnson & Son, Inc., a consumer products company headquartered in Racine, Wisconsin. The son of Herbert Fisk Johnson Jr., he turned a relatively small wax company into a multibillion-dollar global household name. A philanthropist and environmentalist, Johnson led his company and community "to protect this planet and leave it a better place for future generations to live," noting, "A good executive, a busy executive, always has time to do some other things, especially for the good of the community."

== Early years ==
Johnson grew up in Racine, Wisconsin and spent most of his life there. A graduate of the Asheville School in North Carolina, he attended Cornell University and was selected for membership in the Sphinx Head Society before his 1950 graduation with a bachelor's in economics. He then attended the Harvard Business School, from which he graduated in 1952 with a master's in business administration. Johnson also served in the U.S. Air Force as an intelligence officer for 2 years.

== Career ==
In 1967, Johnson became chairman of S. C. Johnson & Son, Inc., and turned a $171 million floor wax company into a multibillion-dollar empire of four global companies which in 2004 employed over 28,000 people and sold products in 110 countries.

Johnson's biggest impact on the business was his role in diversification. Said Johnson, "The primary objective for a corporate leader is to ensure institutional survival.... To survive you have to grow. To grow you have to diversify... When a company is diversified into various fields, it is rarely seriously vulnerable to the ups and downs that ravage individual business. And if you are geographically diversified... then you have some insulation between yourself and localized political and economic trouble."

=== S.C. Johnson & Son ===
Johnson's great-grandfather, Samuel Curtis Johnson Sr., founded the S.C. Johnson Company in 1886 as a parquet floor manufacturing business. The company, renamed S.C. Johnson & Son in 1906 when Johnson's grandfather, Herbert Fisk Johnson Sr., became a partner, began selling wax for hardwood floors in the early 20th century as an additional service. The wax business became more lucrative than parquet floors as the company developed products for surfaces as diverse as dance floors and airplanes.

Johnson's father, Herbert Fisk Johnson Jr., later joined the company commonly referred to as Johnson Wax and became president in 1928. Johnson joined the company in 1954 as assistant to the president and was promoted to new products director in 1955, where he spearheaded the development of the aerosol insecticide, what he called "the first Johnson Wax product without wax." He went on to create the first aerosol air freshener (Glade), the first aerosol insect repellent (OFF!) and the first aerosol furniture polish (Pledge.)

In 1958, Johnson became vice president of the newly formed New Service Products Division and in 1960, he moved to London and served the company as European regional director. It was in this capacity that he noticed other American products on a store shelf in Italy and became determined to never again be late to a global market.

Before becoming elected company president, Johnson served as international vice president in 1962 and moved back to Racine in 1963 as executive vice president. In 1967, he was also elected chairman and chief executive officer. In 1972, he stepped down as president but continued in his capacities as chairman and CEO of the consumer business until 1988. In 1993, he was elected non-executive chairman of the board, a position he held until his retirement in 2000, when he became chairman emeritus of what was then known as SC Johnson – A Family Company.

=== JohnsonDiversey ===
Johnson further diversified his company's offerings in 1979 when he established Worldwide Innochem, a specialty chemical business. Later known as Johnson Professional and then Johnson Polymer, the business became an independent company in 1997. In 2002, the company acquired DiverseyLever and became JohnsonDiversey, Inc., the second largest business-to-business hygiene products company in the world. The company's motto, "Clean is just the beginning," refers to Diversey's position as a worldwide leader in the development and marketing of cleaning and hygiene solutions for commercial, institutional, and industrial facilities.

=== Johnson Financial Group ===
Johnson led his company into the finance industry in 1970 with the establishment of the Heritage Bank & Trust (now Johnson Bank) in Racine. The company, which became the Johnson Financial Group, Inc., further expanded to include Johnson Trust, Johnson Asset Management, Johnson Insurance, Johnson Investment Services, and a number of international businesses in Europe and the Caribbean. Johnson Bank is one of the five largest privately owned community banks and Johnson Insurance is one of the top 100 insurance brokers in the United States. Johnson was the group's Chairman of the Board at the time of his death.

=== Johnson Outdoors ===
Johnson's foray into diversification for his one-time wax-only family business included expanding into the outdoors industry in 1970. That year, Johnson merged Johnson Reels with the company's first outdoor acquisition, Minn Kota Motors, into Johnson Diversified, Inc. Johnson Diversified acquired Eureka! Tent in 1973, Scubapro and Old Town Canoe in 1974, and fourteen other businesses over the course of two decades.

Johnson Diversified became Johnson Worldwide Associates in 1977 before Johnson's family bought out the subsidiary in 1986, and took it public with offerings in 1987 and again in 1988. In 2000, JWA was renamed Johnson Outdoors, Inc. At the time of his death, Johnson was Chairman of the Johnson Outdoors' Executive Committee and Director of the Board.

== Environmentalism ==
Johnson was once described by Fortune magazine in 1993 as "corporate America's leading environmentalist." Johnson was committed to environmental causes, stating, "We must make sure that we step softly on the land... Once you destroy an old growth forest, or a special plant in the Amazon, or a reef around an atoll, it's gone forever."

=== Leader of the CFC ban ===
Johnson was one of the first business leaders to recognize the danger to the Earth's ozone layer from chlorofluorocarbons (CFCs), a then-popular propellant in aerosol products, voluntarily banning the substance from all of S.C. Johnson's products in 1975 to the shock and anger of many people inside the company and across the nation.

The then-unproven scientific research led Johnson to publish a letter to the public explaining his decision. "Our own company scientists confirm that as a scientific hypothesis it may be possible.... We concur that the pressing need for reliable scientific investigation.... We at Johnson Wax are taking this action in the interest of our customers and the public in general during a period of uncertainty and scientific inquiry."

Over the next few years, Johnson encouraged his scientists to develop the company's many non-CFC aerosol propellants and pulled his aerosol business out of several countries in which CFCs were mandated in aerosol production. Three years after Johnson recalled and ceased production of all CFC products, the U.S. government corroborated the research of the substance's harmful effects and unilaterally banned CFCs. Johnson was praised for his early decision.

=== The World Business Council for Sustainable Development ===
Johnson was a founding member of the World Business Council for Sustainable Development (WBCSD).

Johnson incorporated environmentally responsible behavior into his business and believed that all businesses could be successful with the same mindset. Said Johnson of his involvement with the council, "We aggressively seek out eco-efficiencies--ways of doing more with less--because it makes us more competitive when we reduce and eliminate waste and risk from our products and processes. And it saves us money. By developing products that are as safe as possible for people and the environment, we improve our market share."

The WBCSD named Johnson a member of the Order of Outstanding Contributors to Sustainable Development in 2003.

=== The President's Council on Sustainable Development ===
Because of Johnson's work with the WBCSD, President Bill Clinton appointed him to the President's Council on Sustainable Development in 1993. The group advised President Clinton and Vice President Al Gore until 1999 on ways to strengthen a community by improving the local economy, helping save the environment, and promoting equal opportunities for every American.

=== The fight against dirty coal ===
In 2003, Johnson personally financed an in-depth, grass-roots driven campaign against Wisconsin Energy Corporation's proposal to build three new coal plants in Oak Creek, Wisconsin, stating, "I think their choice is a terrible mistake considering the health and quality of life risks that coal presents."

The campaign, organized under the moniker of RESET (Responsible Energy for Southeastern Wisconsin's Tomorrow), consisted of print and radio ads as well as a public affairs education program. Citing that the already-existent seventeen Wisconsin coal plants produced 60% more smog-forming nitric oxide pollution and 63% more soot-producing sulfur oxide pollution than that allowed by the Clean Air Act, the group delayed but failed to derail new coal plant construction.

=== The Nature Conservancy ===
A long-time member of both the President's Conservation Council of the Nature Conservancy and the National Development Council of the Nature Conservancy, Johnson and his company partnered with the Conservancy to create a reserve in the Caatinga region of northeastern Brazil, which he dedicated to the memory of his father. Johnson's reserve, the largest private Caatinga reserve in Brazil, protects 173 species of birds, 40 species of mammals, and 140 species of plants. For his work, the Ceará (Brazil) Legislative Assembly named Johnson an honorary citizen of the State of Ceará in 2000. The following year, the Wisconsin Chapter of The Nature Conservancy elected Johnson Honorary Trustee.

== Philanthropy ==
In addition to his environmental work, Johnson greatly contributed to education, better health, and greater opportunities for the people of his community and around the world. Although his financial contributions were considerable—his corporate donations were around 5% annually—Johnson preferred to become personally involved with many philanthropic organizations.

Said Johnson in 1988, "For voluntarism to take hold as part of a company's culture, there must be a key executive who sets the example by personal involvement.... I spend a good twenty to thirty percent of my time, or about two days of every seven, on what I call 'not-for-profit' activities.... Raising money is only one part of voluntarism; indeed it is not the most important. A more important part is the devotion of time by the people who actually service the organizations and spend a good portion of their free time working at no pay."

=== Mayo Clinic ===
Johnson was the longest serving public member of the Mayo Foundation Board of Trustees, serving from 1967 to 1990 and acting as one-time Chairman. Mayo honored Johnson for his contributions in 1991 during the groundbreaking ceremonies of the $26-million-dollar state-of-the-art S.C. Johnson Medical Research Center on the Mayo Clinic's 140-acre (0.57 km^{2}) campus in Scottsdale, Arizona. In 2004, the year of his death, Johnson, his family, and the S.C. Johnson Fund donated more than $12 million to the establishment of Mayo's Samuel C. Johnson Program in the Genomics of Addiction.

Johnson reflected on his contributions to the Mayo Clinic in 1991: "I've made a commitment to this research center because I believe in the importance of medical research; I believe in the power of science to help relieve human suffering; and I believe in putting able, curious minds to work for the betterment of mankind."

=== The Smithsonian Institution ===
Johnson first publicly promoted his love of the arts in 1962 with S.C. Johnson's ART:USA, the Johnson Collection of Contemporary American Painting. One of the first corporate-sponsored touring art collections, ART:USA featured 102 paintings by living American artists and toured 18 cities around the world for two years prior to a two-and-a-half-year tour through 25 American cities, breaking attendance records around the world.

Johnson donated the collection to the Smithsonian Institution in the mid-sixties citing its value because it had "reached people around the world" and "enhanced the company's reputation for doing the unusual in the name of excellence."

=== Cornell University and the Johnson School of Management ===
Johnson served as a Trustee Emeritus and Presidential Councillor at Cornell University, his alma mater. In 1984, Johnson and his family made a $20 million endowment gift to the Samuel Curtis Johnson Graduate School of Management that was named after Johnson's great-grandfather, who founded Johnson Wax. In 1989, Johnson was named to the Johnson School of Management Hall of Honor in recognition of his advisory council leadership. Later gifts to Cornell, including gifts in 2004 in the amount of $5 million to establish the Center for Sustainable Global Enterprise as well as $2.5 million to create the S.C. Johnson Professorship in Sustainable Global Enterprise, supported the teaching of business and sustainability at the University. An additional gift created a new facility for the Cornell Laboratory of Ornithology.

=== The Prairie School ===
Johnson's wife, Imogene Powers Johnson founded The Prairie School in Wind Point, Wisconsin, along with good friend Willie Hilpert in 1965. According to Johnson there was "a need in our community to augment our respected public school system with a curriculum and a learning environment to develop individual student achievement in a college preparatory program."

The children of many S. C. Johnson employees attend the school to this day. This pre-K-12 college preparatory private school features small classes and an emphasis on strong academics, extra curricular activities, and community activism. The unique architecture of the school was influenced by Frank Lloyd Wright's designs. Johnson served as the school's Chairman of the Board until 1983, when he was named Founding Chairman Emeritus, a position he held until his death. His wife Imogene continued on the school's board in the same position.

=== Downtown Racine, Wisconsin ===
Johnson took part in the organization of the Downtown Racine Development Corporation in the 1980s, a community effort to restore the historic downtown area of the city which is the hometown of Johnson and his companies. His employees were among the local citizens to first donate time and money and to convince the local government to donate millions to restoration projects, including developing the harbor along Lake Michigan to include a festival site.

Johnson further contributed to the revitalization of the downtown Racine area in 2002, when he commissioned William McDonough, a pioneer in green-architecture, to design the Johnson Building. Built on a former empty parking lot in the middle of the downtown area, the building is global headquarters for Johnson Outdoors and Johnson Financial Group. Local government officials named the street to the south of the building "Sam Johnson Parkway" in Johnson's honor.

== Personal life ==
Johnson met his wife, Imogene Powers Johnson, at Cornell University in 1946. They wed in 1954 and had been married fifty years at the time of his death. Johnson and his wife had four children, Samuel Curtis "Curt" Johnson III, Helen Johnson-Leipold, Herbert Fisk "Fisk" Johnson III and Winifred "Winnie" (Johnson) Marquart, as well as twelve grandchildren and three step-grandchildren at the time of his death.

=== Carnauba, A Son's Memoir ===
Johnson's father, Herbert Fisk "H.F." Johnson Jr., and a team of Johnson Wax employees undertook a two-month, 7,500-mile (12,100 km) expedition to northeast Brazil in 1935 in search of a sustainable source of carnauba wax. On his return, he published a book, dedicating the book to his son: "To Sammy, I hope you make this trip some day. It changed my life. Love, Dad."

Sixty-three years later, in 1998, Johnson recreated his father's journey with his two sons. Johnson undertook the journey, documented in a 2001 film called Carnauba: A Son's Memoir, in a replica Sikorsky S-38 amphibious plane like the one his father used. During the course of the film, Johnson reflects on his somewhat difficult relationship with his often-absent father as well as his own battle with alcoholism. Said Johnson of the journey, "I started to get this idea that some people thought was crazy, but something was telling me to do it… to recreate my father's airplane and retrace his journey. [My wife] Gene said I was doing it to spend more time with my father after all these years... in the end that turned out to be true."
