= Diversey Holdings =

Manufacturer of hygiene products

Diversey Holdings, Ltd.
- Company type: Subsidiary
- Traded as: Nasdaq: DSEY (2021–2023)
- Industry: Chemicals; Hygiene; Sanitization
- Founded: August 4, 1923; 101 years ago
- Founder: August Kochs; Herbert Kochs
- Products: Cleaning, food safety, business-to-business products and services
- Revenue: ▲US$2.63 billion (2020)
- Number of employees: 8,700 (December 31, 2021)
- Parent: Solenis
- Website: diversey.com

Diversey Holdings, Ltd. is an American provider of cleaning and hygiene products.

It serves the hospitality, healthcare, food and beverage, food service, retail, and facility management markets. It also provides chemicals, floor care machines, tools and equipment, technology-based value-added services, food safety services, and water and energy management.

They have a branch in Mumbai, India under the name Diversey India Hygiene Pvt.Ltd. Diversey extended its Prosumer Solutions to target a large, fragmented market of small professional users.

On July 5, 2023, Solenis announced that it had completed its acquisition of the company for $4.6 billion.

== History ==
Diversey Corporation was founded in Chicago in 1923 by August and Herbert Kochs as a division of their Victor Chemical Works cleaning products company. It was named after nearby Diversey Avenue and became independent in 1950. In 1978, Diversey was acquired by Molson. Herbert Kochs retired the next year. Molson merged into Diversey another American cleaning chemicals company, BASF Wyandotte Corporation, expanding its presence to 36 countries. In 1996, the now Northbrook, Illinois headquartered Diversey was acquired by Unilever, who merged it with Industrial Lever to form DiverseyLever based in Cincinnati, Ohio. It was named DiverseyLever from 1996 to 2002.

Johnson Wax Professional bought the business from Unilever in 2002, when it became known as JohnsonDiversey, Inc., while Unilever retained an interest in the DiverseyLever unit. Johnson Wax Professional had been a subsidiary of S. C. Johnson & Son until 1999, when it was spun off. In November 2009, Clayton, Dubilier & Rice acquired 46 percent of JohnsonDiversey. In March 2010, JohnsonDiversey changed its name to Diversey, Inc., with a new tagline, "for a cleaner, healthier future."

In February 2011, Curt Johnson stepped down as the head of Diversey following allegations of child sexual assault.

In June 2011, Sealed Air announced that it was purchasing Diversey Holdings for $4.3 billion (9.5x 2010 Adj. EBITDA of $452mm), and the deal was completed in October that year. Diversey President and CEO Edward Lonergan continued to lead under the new Diversey Care name after the Sealed Air acquisition. The Carlyle Group bought Diversey G.K., "Diversey Japan" (an indirect subsidiary of Diversey, Inc.) in November 2012.

During its time under Sealed Air, Diversey Care focused on a strategy of technological innovation. This included the launch of the first global range of commercial cleaning robots across the US and Europe, and a digital food safety management platform that helps organizations to achieve regulatory compliance in the food industry.

In March 2017, Bain Capital announced that it was purchasing the Diversey Care division of Sealed Air for $3.2 billion, with the intention of running Diversey as a standalone company. In August 2017, Dr. Ilham Kadri was named as the president and CEO, and the sale was completed in September 2017.

In 2018 the company moved its headquarters to Fort Mill, South Carolina. In October 2018, it was announced that CEO Kadri resigned her position as of December 31, 2018. Diversey CFO Carlos Sagasta, along with Global President Professional Division Gaetano Redaelli, became joint deputy CEOs. On January 1, 2019, Mark Burgess took the position of CEO. On July 14, 2020, Phil Wieland took the position of CEO of Diversey. On March 25, 2021, Diversey filed for an IPO.

In March 2023, Solenis, a Wilmington, Delaware based specialty chemical company which specializes in water-intensive industries, announced the acquisition of Diversey Holdings for $4.6 Billion, and expects the merger to be completed in the second half of 2023. Solenis plans to turn the company private, and upon completion of the transition, Diversey's ordinary shares will no longer be listed on any public market.

On July 5, 2023, Diversey Holdings became part of Solenis after its acquisition was completed.
