= Herbert Fisk Johnson III =

American businessman

- Born: May 19, 1958 (age 68); Racine, Wisconsin, U.S.
- Education: Cornell University (BA); Cornell University (MBA)
- Occupation: Businessman
- Title: Chairman and CEO, S. C. Johnson & Son
- Spouse: Susan Lochhead (divorced)
- Children: 1
- Parent(s): Samuel Curtis Johnson Jr. Imogene Powers Johnson

Herbert Fisk Johnson III (born May 19, 1958), known as Fisk, is an American billionaire businessman. He is the fifth generation of his family to lead S. C. Johnson & Son, Inc of Racine, Wisconsin, as chairman and CEO. As of February 2025, his net worth was estimated at US$4.5 billion.

== Early life and education ==
He is the son of the late Samuel Curtis Johnson Jr. (1928–2004) and Imogene Powers Johnson, and the great-great-grandson of company founder Samuel Curtis Johnson. His three siblings and mother each had a net worth of $3 billion as of May 2015.

He received five degrees from Cornell University and Cornell's Samuel Curtis Johnson Graduate School of Management, a BA in chemistry and physics in 1979, a Master of Engineering in 1980, an MS in applied physics in 1982, an MBA in marketing and finance in 1984, and a PhD in applied physics in 1986.

== Career ==
He joined the family business in 1987 as a marketing associate and served in a number of roles. He was appointed chairman in 2000, and CEO in 2004.

On behalf of the company, he accepted a 2006 Ron Brown Award, a presidential award for corporate leadership.

== Public policy work ==
He has served as a:

- member of President's Advisory Committee for Trade Policy and Negotiation
- member of the World Business Council for Sustainable Development
- director on the board of Conservation International
- member of the executive board of CI's Center for Environmental Leadership in business
- trustee emeritus of Cornell University

== Patents ==
He is one of the inventors listed on U.S. Patent #7028405, entitled "Vibratory Shaver", and U.S. patent application #20060238136, entitled "Lamp and bulb for illumination and ambiance lighting".

== Charity ==
His extended family is the named benefactor of the Samuel Curtis Johnson Graduate School of Management at Cornell University. He has supported Chicago's Shedd Aquarium. On 28 January 2017, he and the SC Johnson company donated $150 million to Cornell to name the SC Johnson College of Business, which comprises the previously endowed Samuel Curtis Johnson Graduate School of Management, the Charles H. Dyson School of Applied Economics, and the School of Hotel Administration.

== Personal life ==
Johnson was married to Dr. Susan Lochhead, a former emergency room physician, for 13 months. Johnson and Lochhead have a daughter. Their divorce proceeding went for three years. He lives in Racine, Wisconsin.
