= Greek Revival architecture in North America =

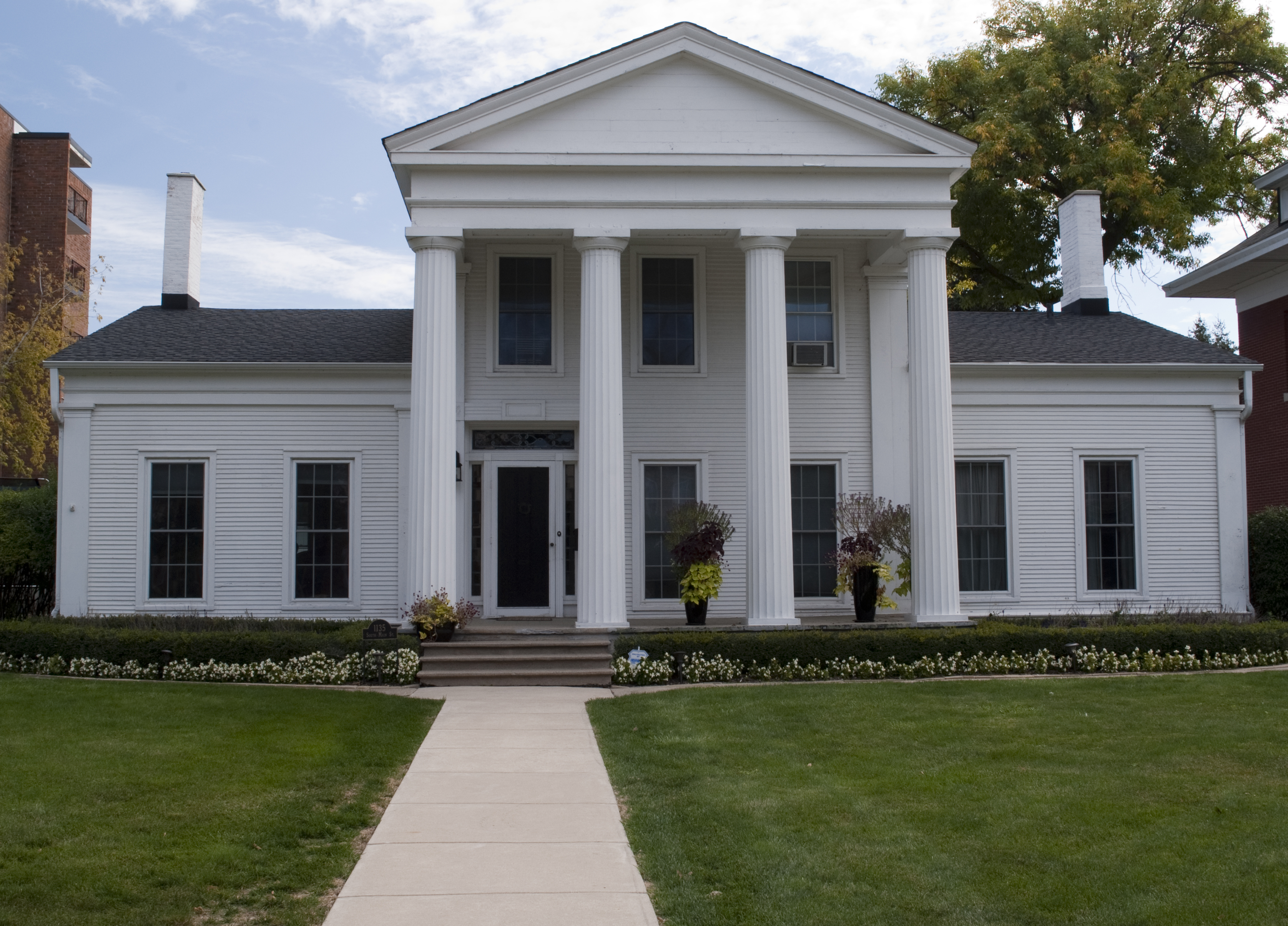
The Eli R. Cooley House in Racine, Wisconsin, early 1850s.

American Greek Revival was an architectural style popular in the United States and Canada from about 1800 to 1860. The unique American interpretation of a larger Greek Revival of the era allowed many rural and vernacular interpretations to flourish, and these further influenced the development of many other styles, such as the gablefront. Marcus Whiffen states that the "first building in the United States to incorporate a Greek order was the Bank of Pennsylvania in Philadelphia, designed by Benjamin Henry Latrobe in 1798". Talbot Hamlin says that "The period called 'Greek Revival,' extend[s] roughly from 1820 to 1860."

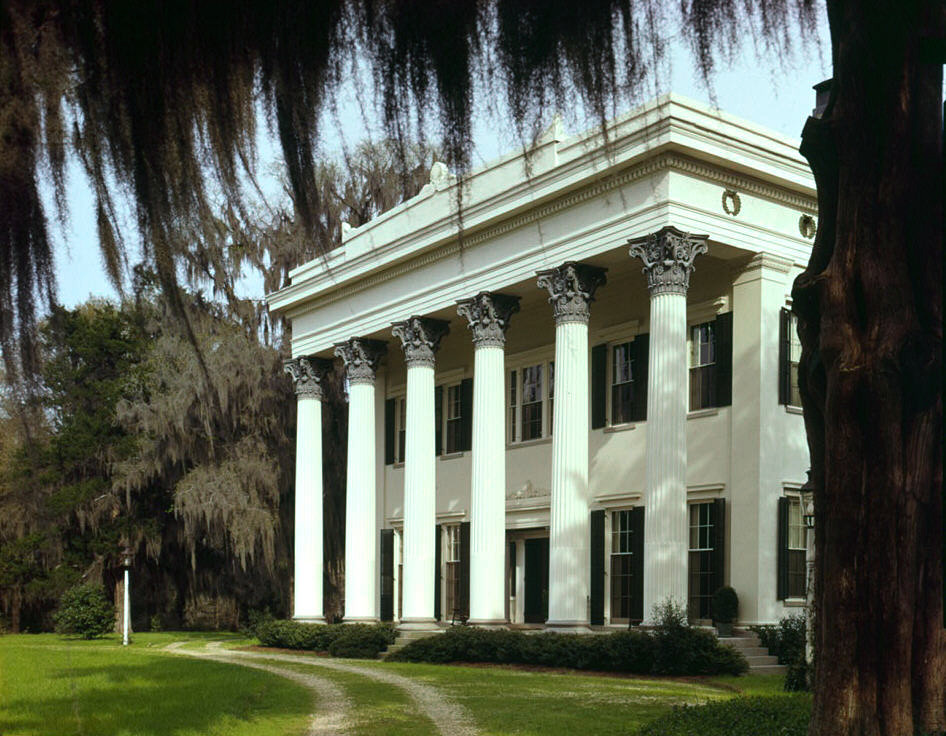
The Millford Plantation, South Carolina, ca. 1840

The style was employed in ecclesiastical, institutional, and residential buildings. Virtually all the buildings in the style are characterized by the use of columns or pilasters, usually from the Greek orders. "Bilateral symmetry is the rule," with the main portion of the buildings being "block" or "temple" shaped with a low pitched or flat roof. Many buildings in this style, particularly rural farmhouses of New England and the Midwest, use an asymmetrical Upright and Wing floorplan, though this has many regional and vernacular variants. Many Antebellum plantations were completed in the Greek Revival style, with large colonnade porches. Arches were not employed because "the arch had no place in Greek temple architecture."

Several factors led to the style's popularity in the United States, two of them wars. The War of 1812 between the United States and Great Britain led the former colonials in America to wish to disassociate themselves from things British, such as the previously popular Adam style, while the Greek War of Independence, begun in 1821, helped make things Greek admired and emulated.

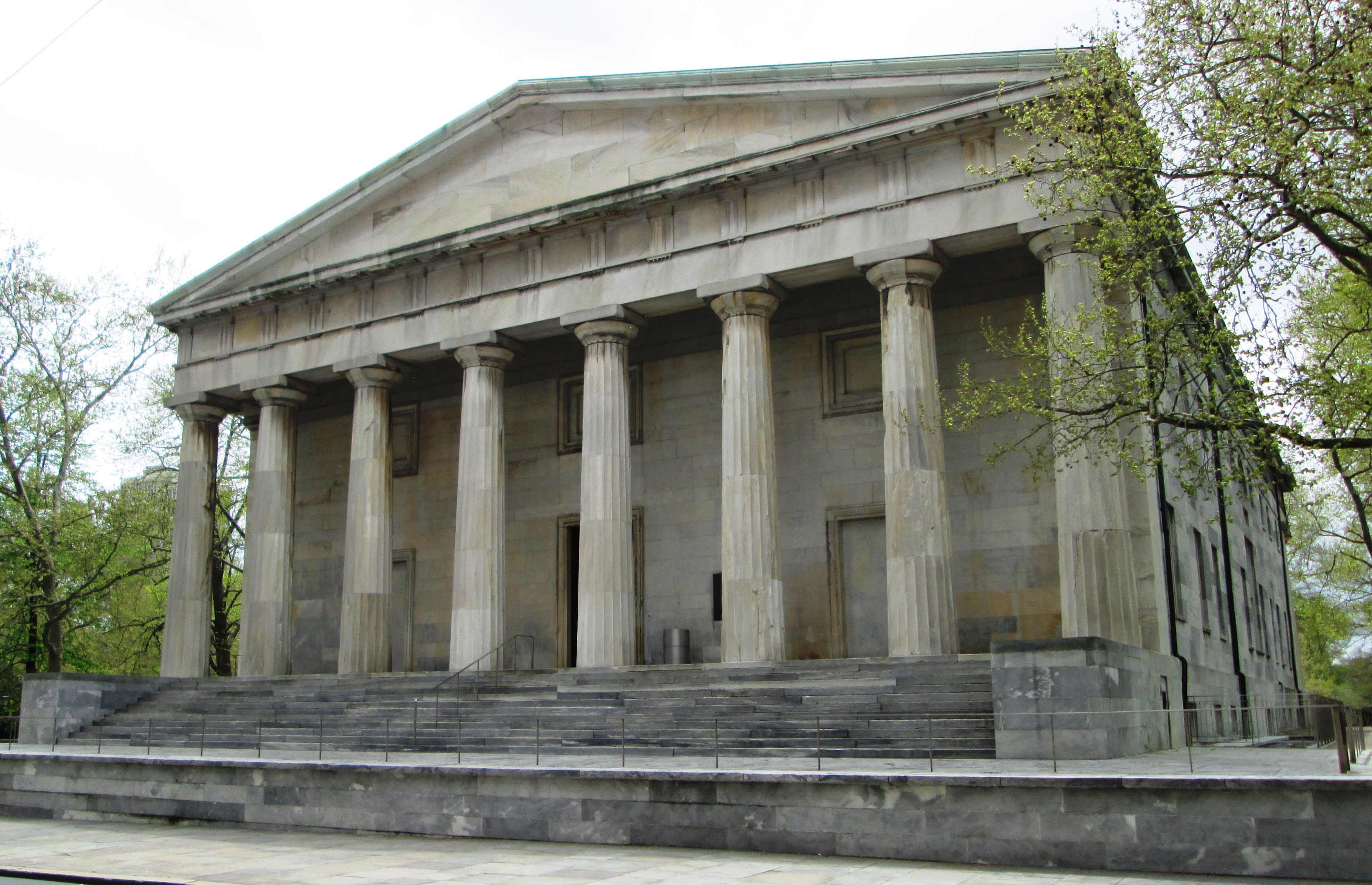
Second Bank of the United States, Philadelphia, Pennsylvania, 1798.

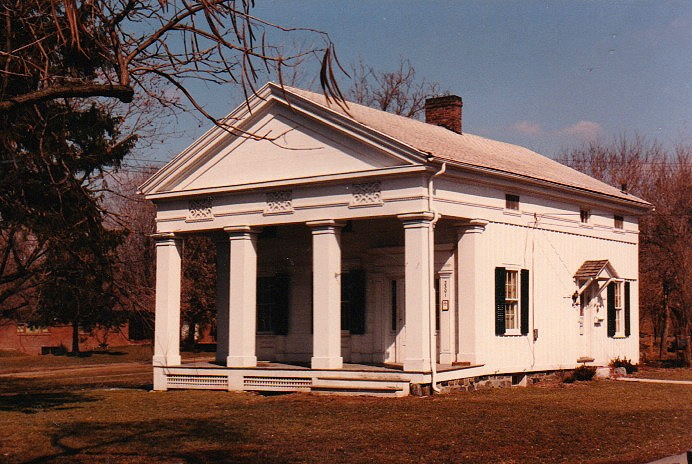
Rural Greek Revival in Michigan, ca. 1850.

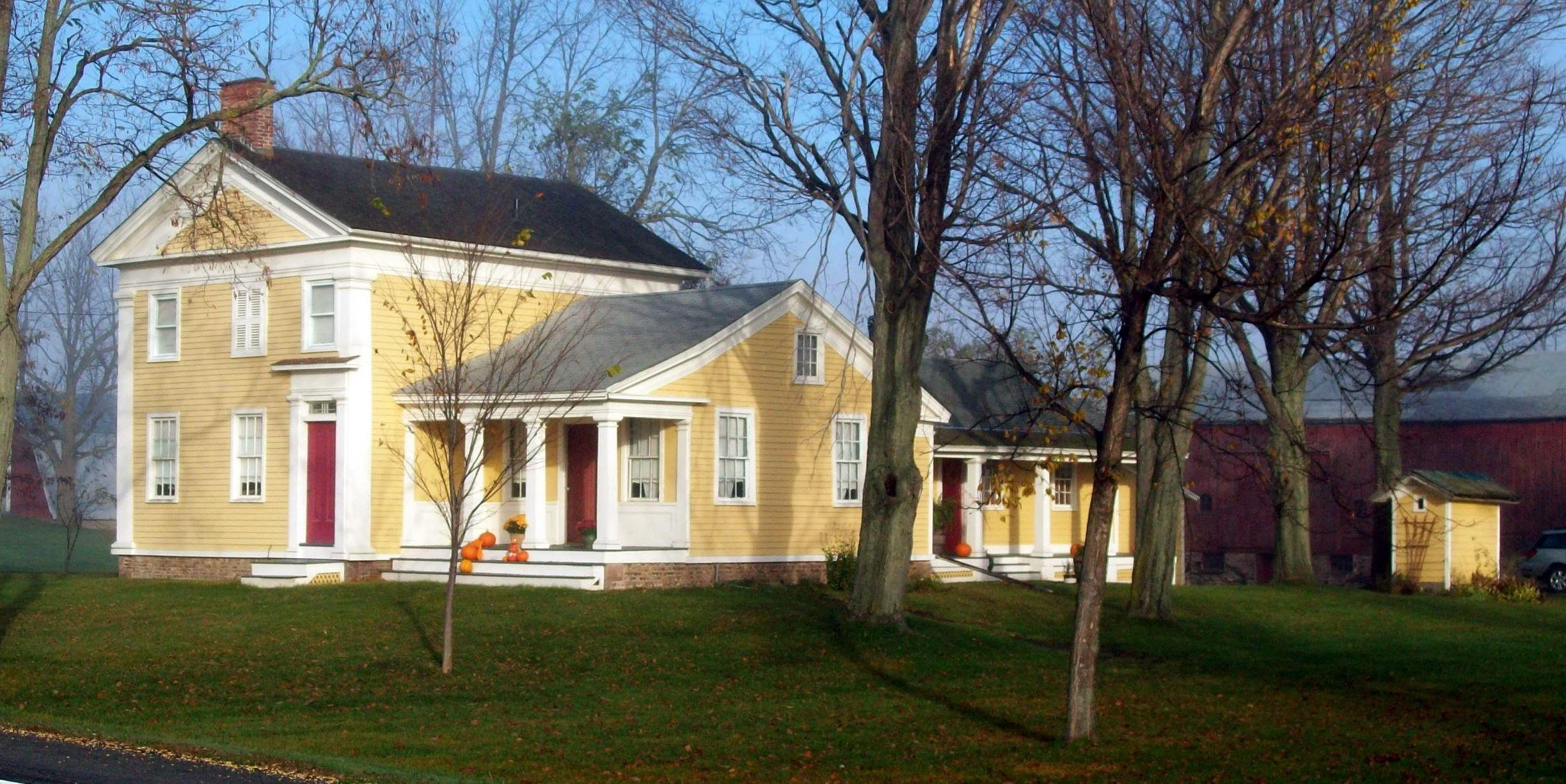
Benjamin Franklin Gates House, New York state, ca. 1830s. An early Upright and Wing example.

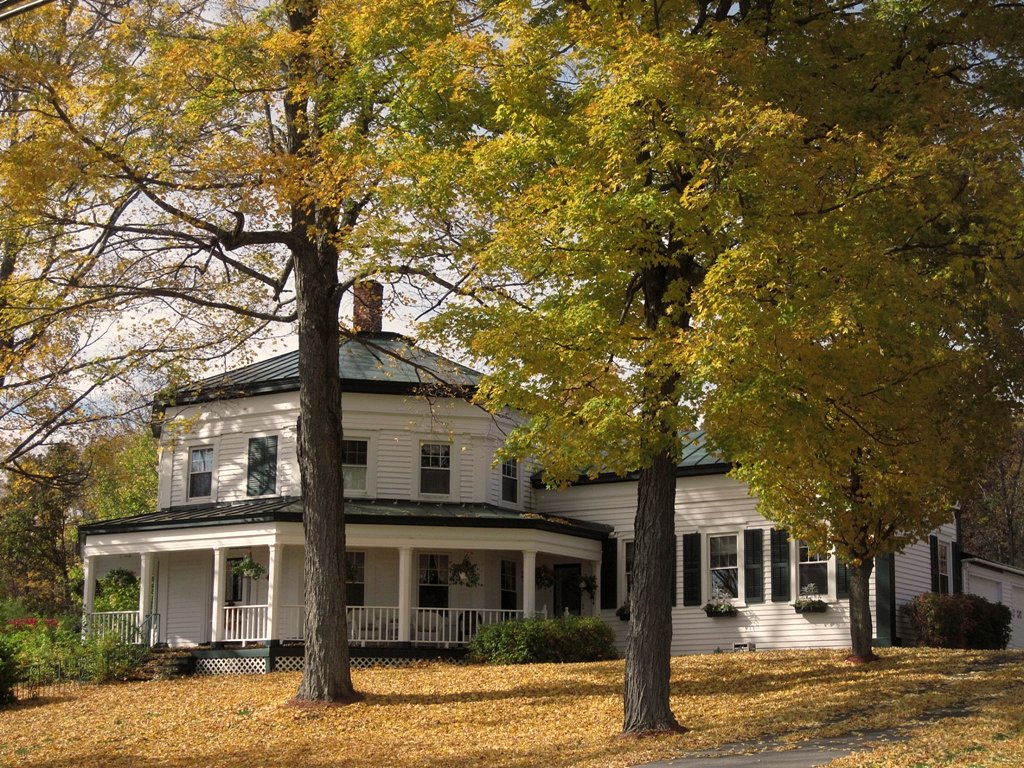
The Jenkins Octagon House, an octagon house in New York with Greek Revival details.

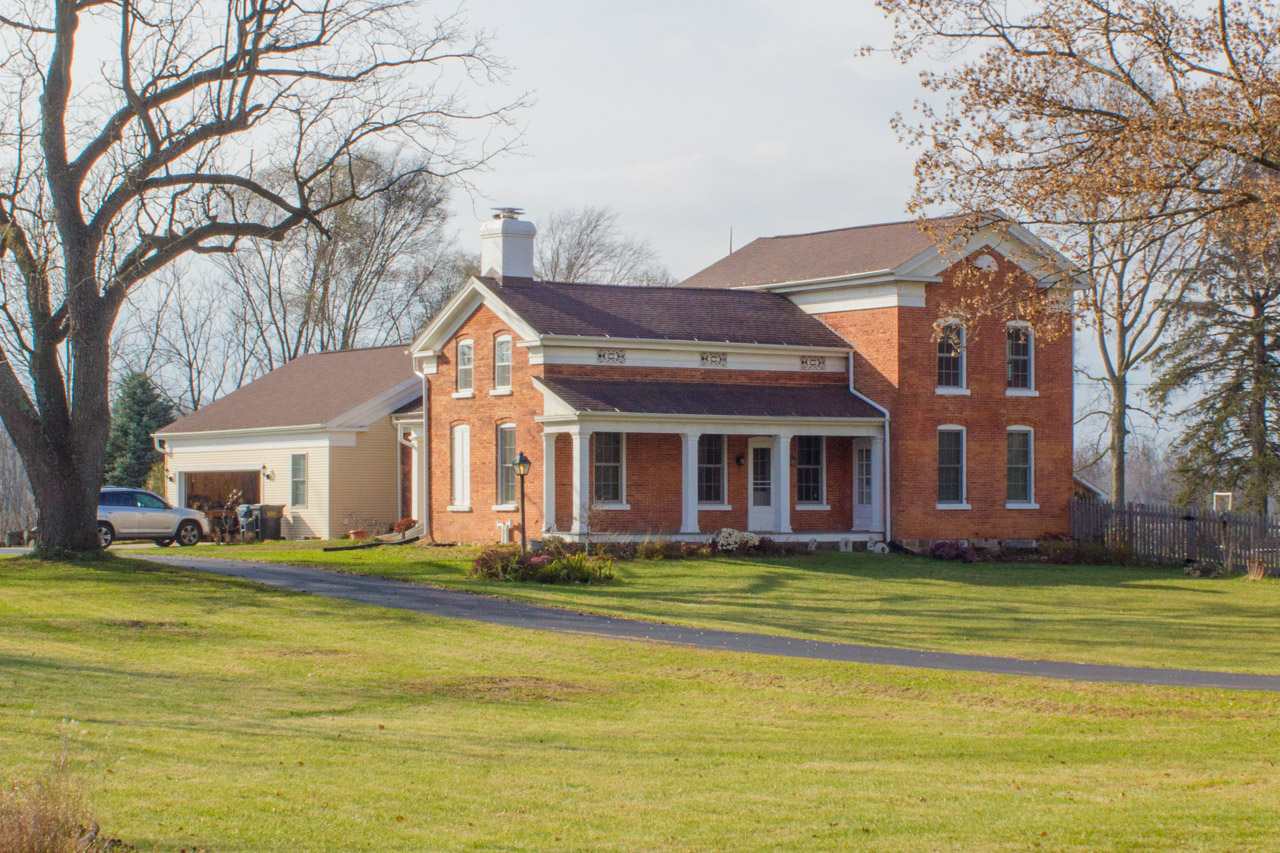
A brick example of the Upright and Wing plan in Michigan, 1863–1864.

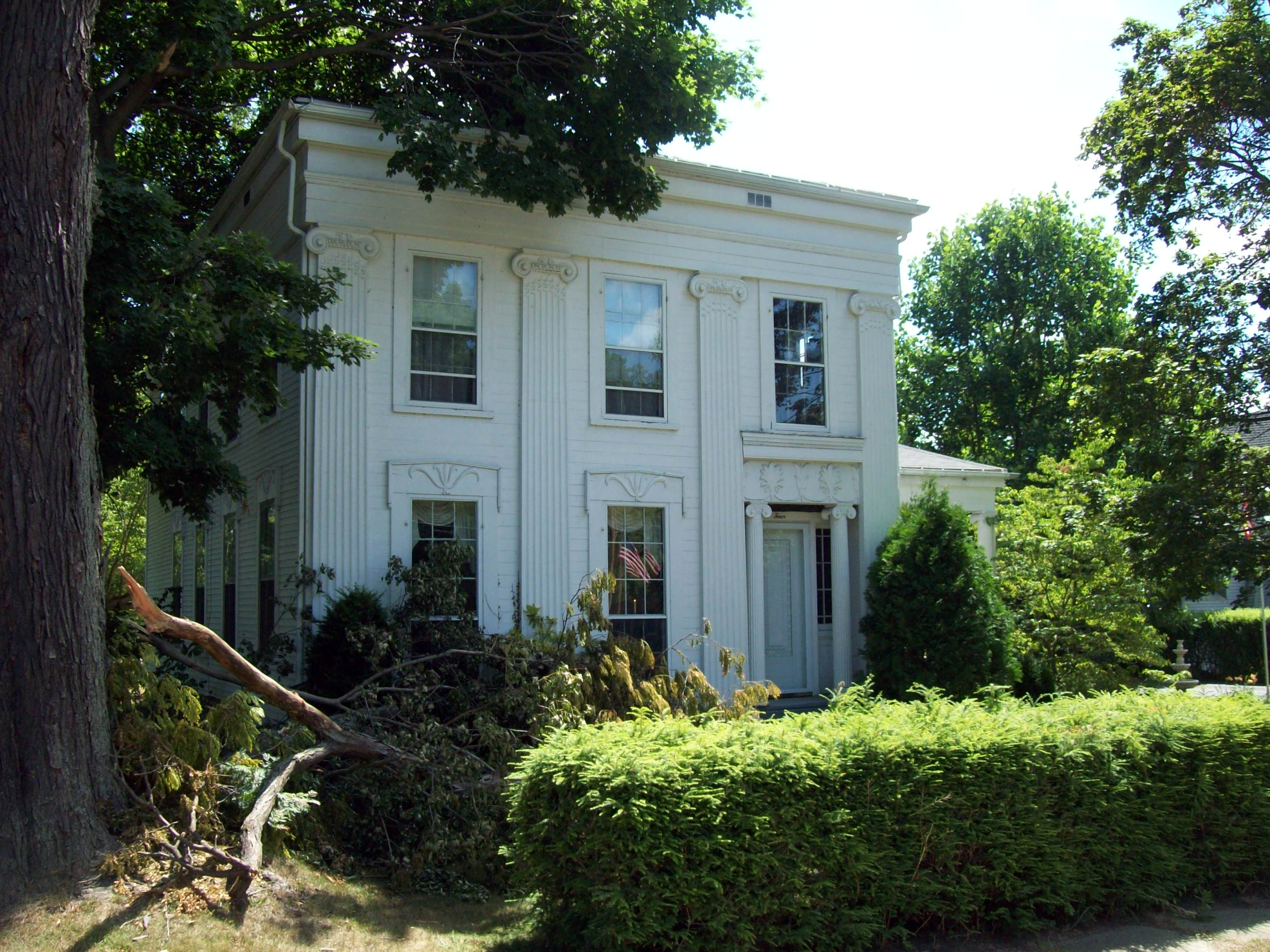
The Smith Bly House in New York state featuring Ionic pilasters, 1835.

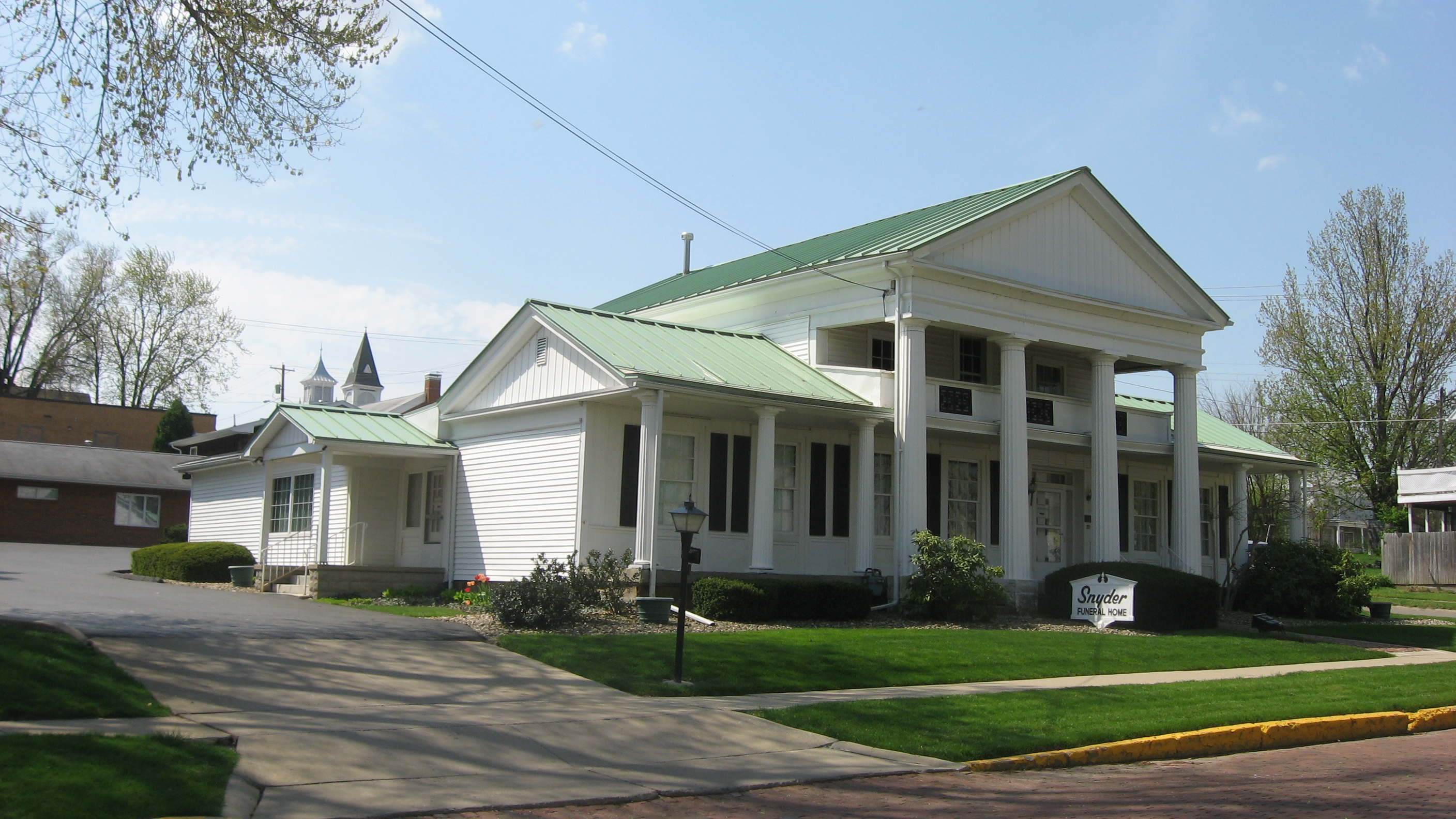
The Tuttle House in Ohio, 1840.

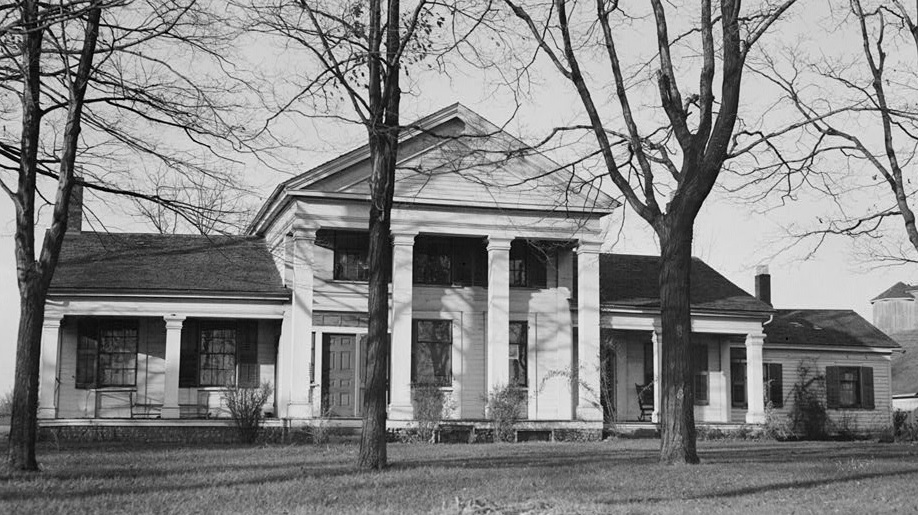
The non-extant Sidney T. Smith House, Michigan, ca. 1840.

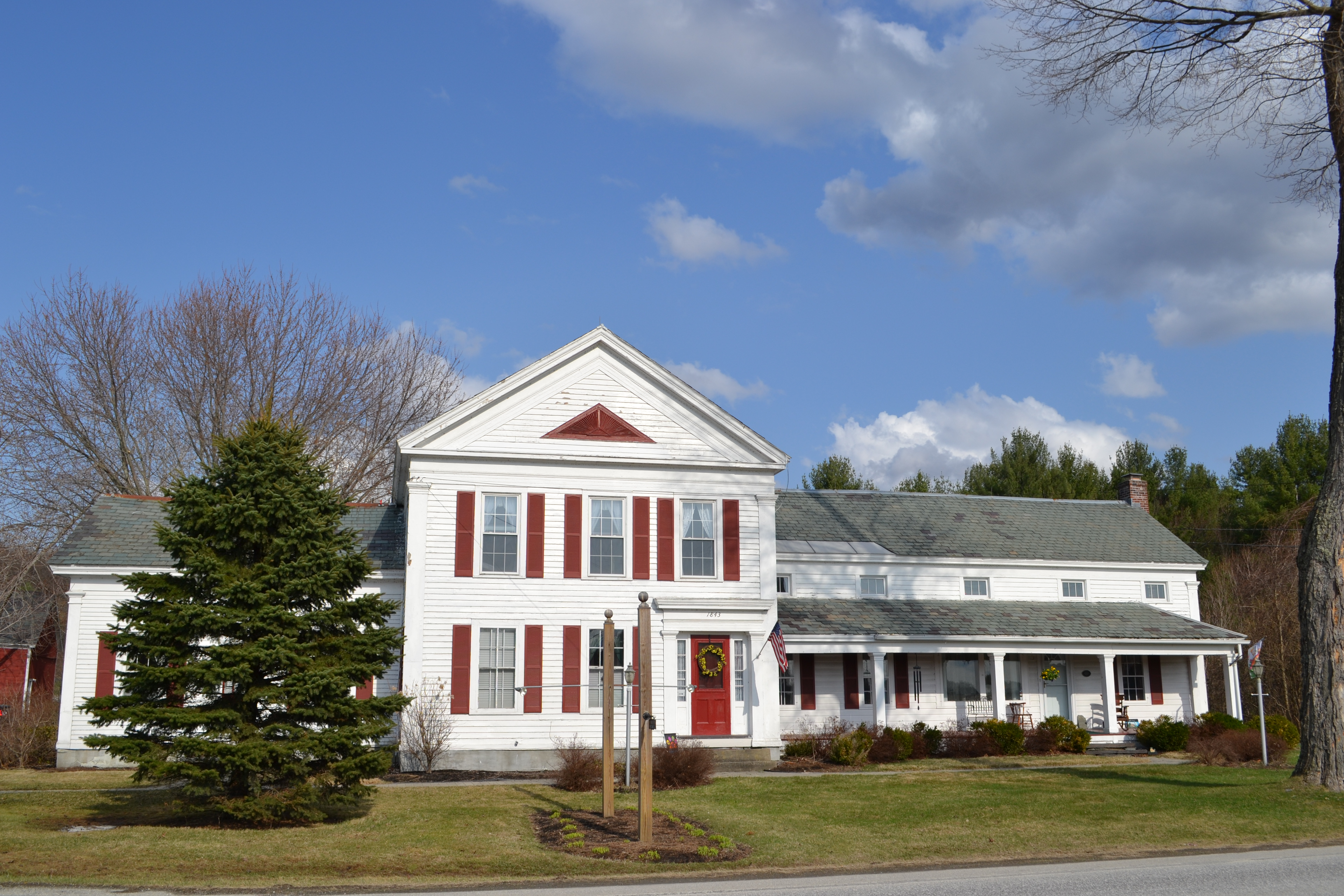
The Asahel Kidder House, Vermont, 1843.

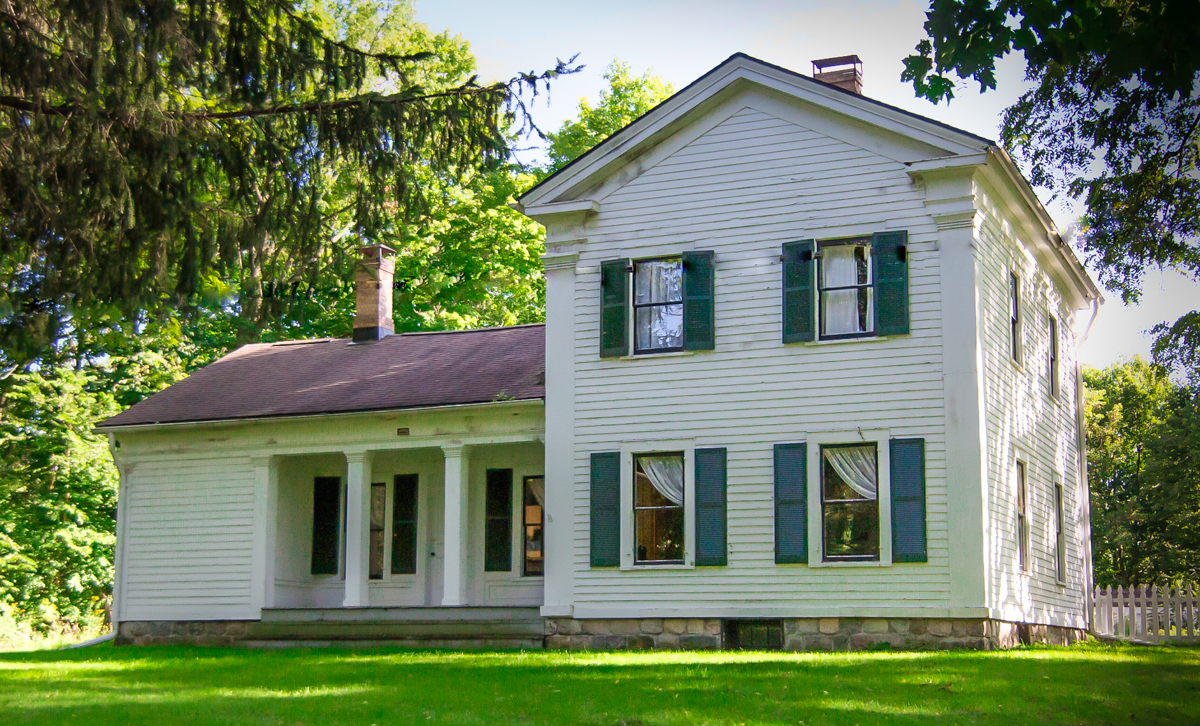
Delano Farms, another Upright and Wing example. Michigan, 1858.

The I.O.O.F. Hall in Garnavillo, Iowa, 1860.

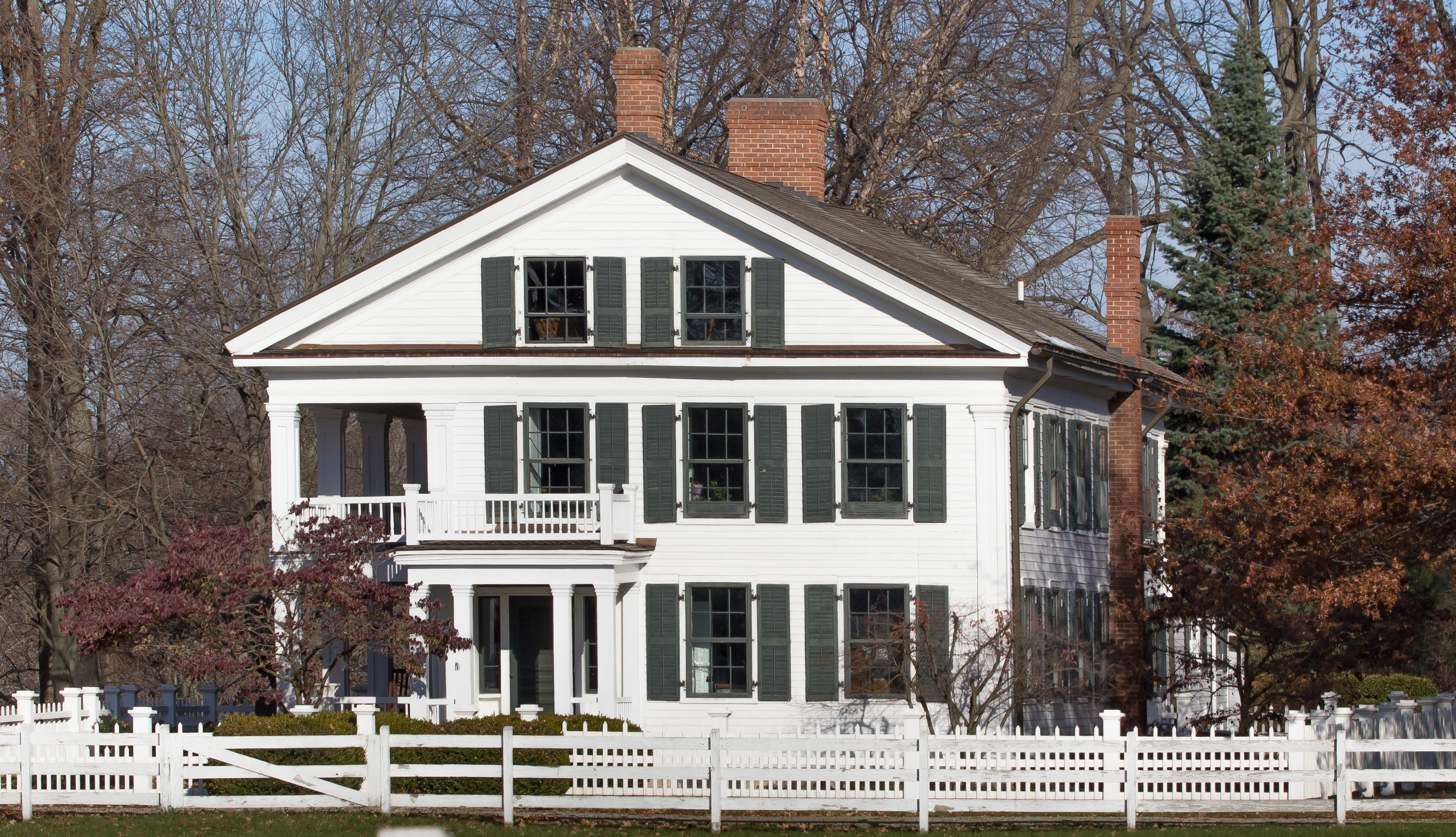
An early, asymmetrical, vernacular example in Michigan, the Marantette House, 1835.

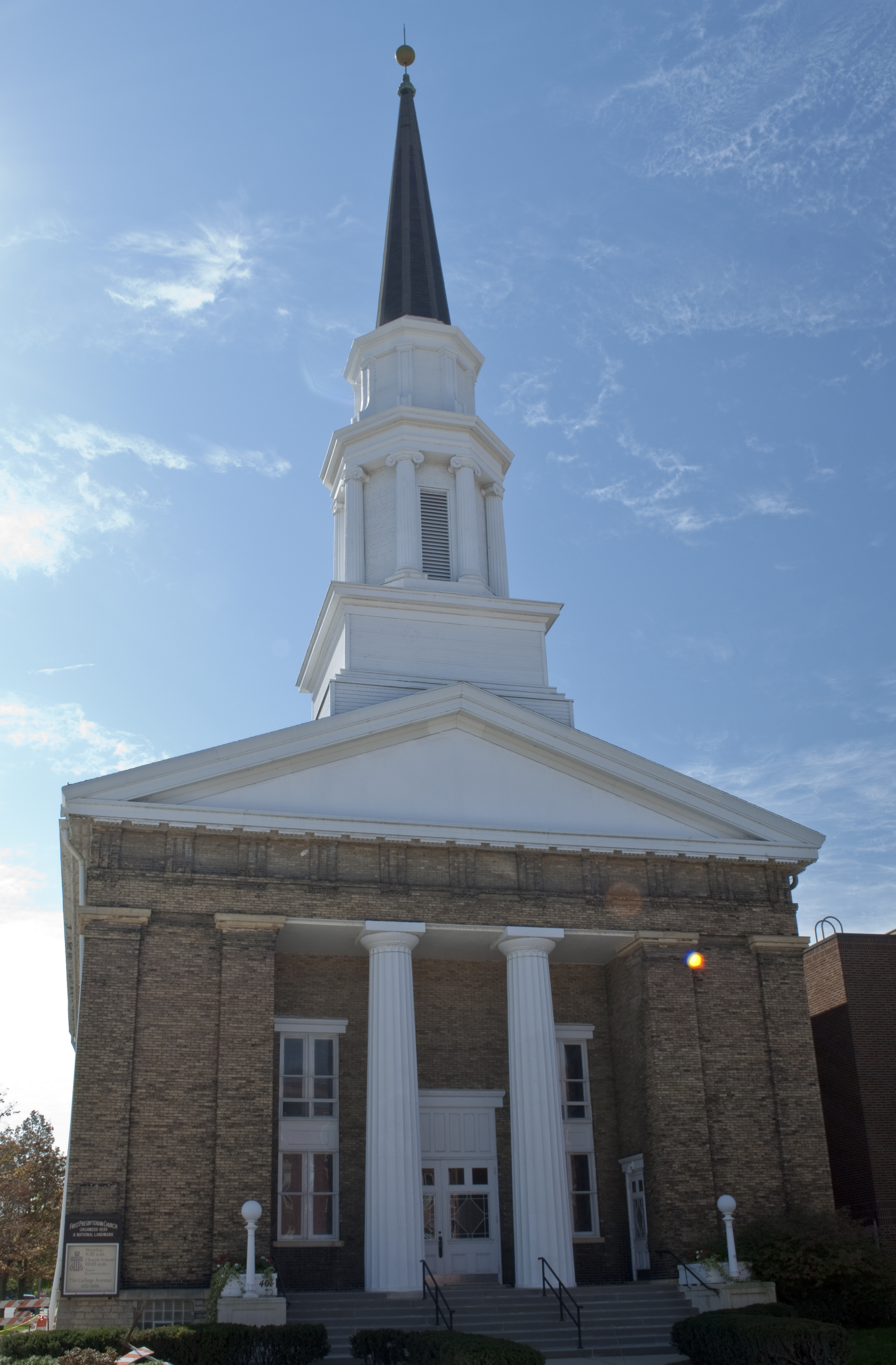
The First Presbyterian Church in Racine, Wisconsin, 1852.

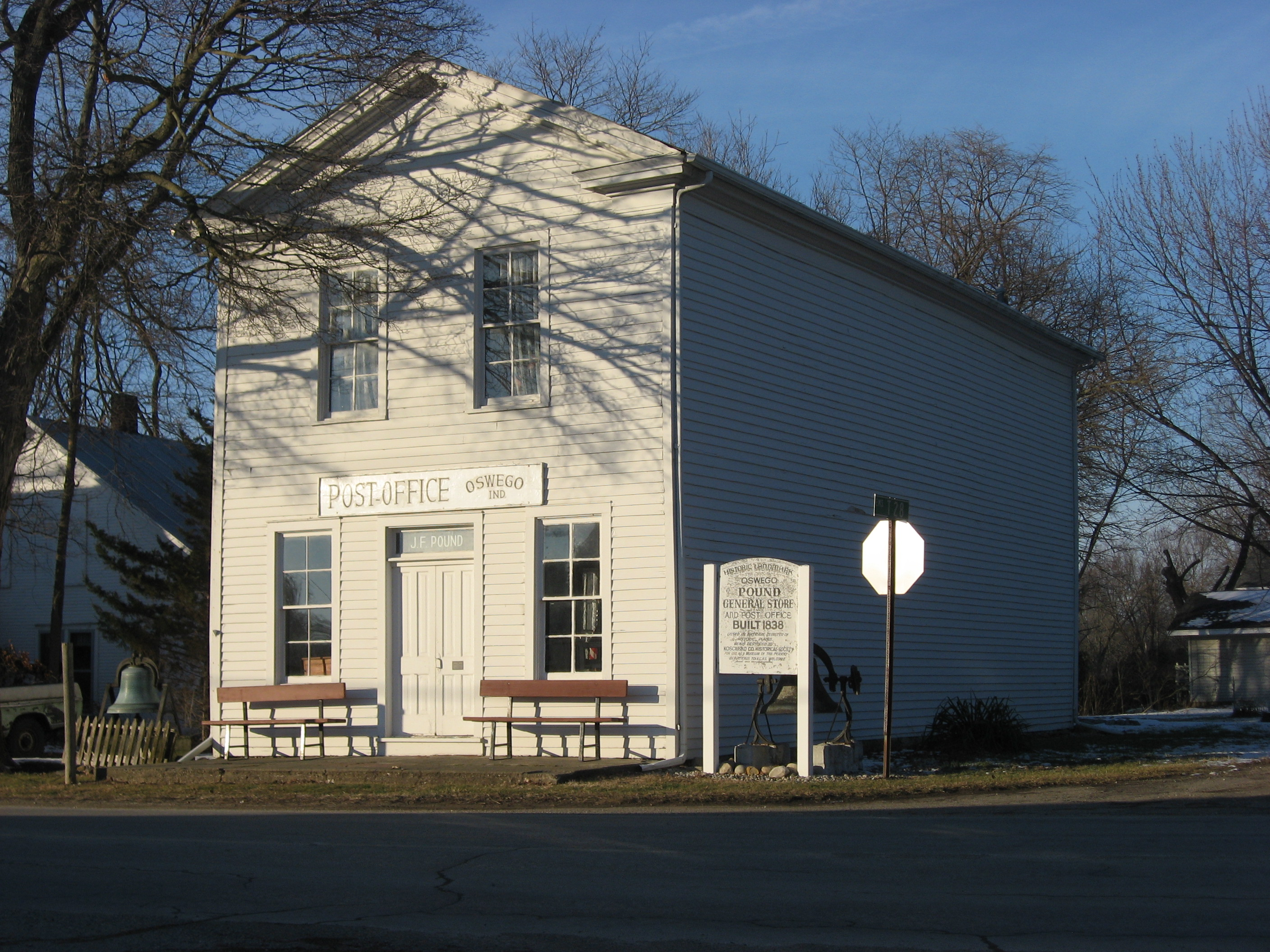
The John Pound Store, Indiana, 1838.

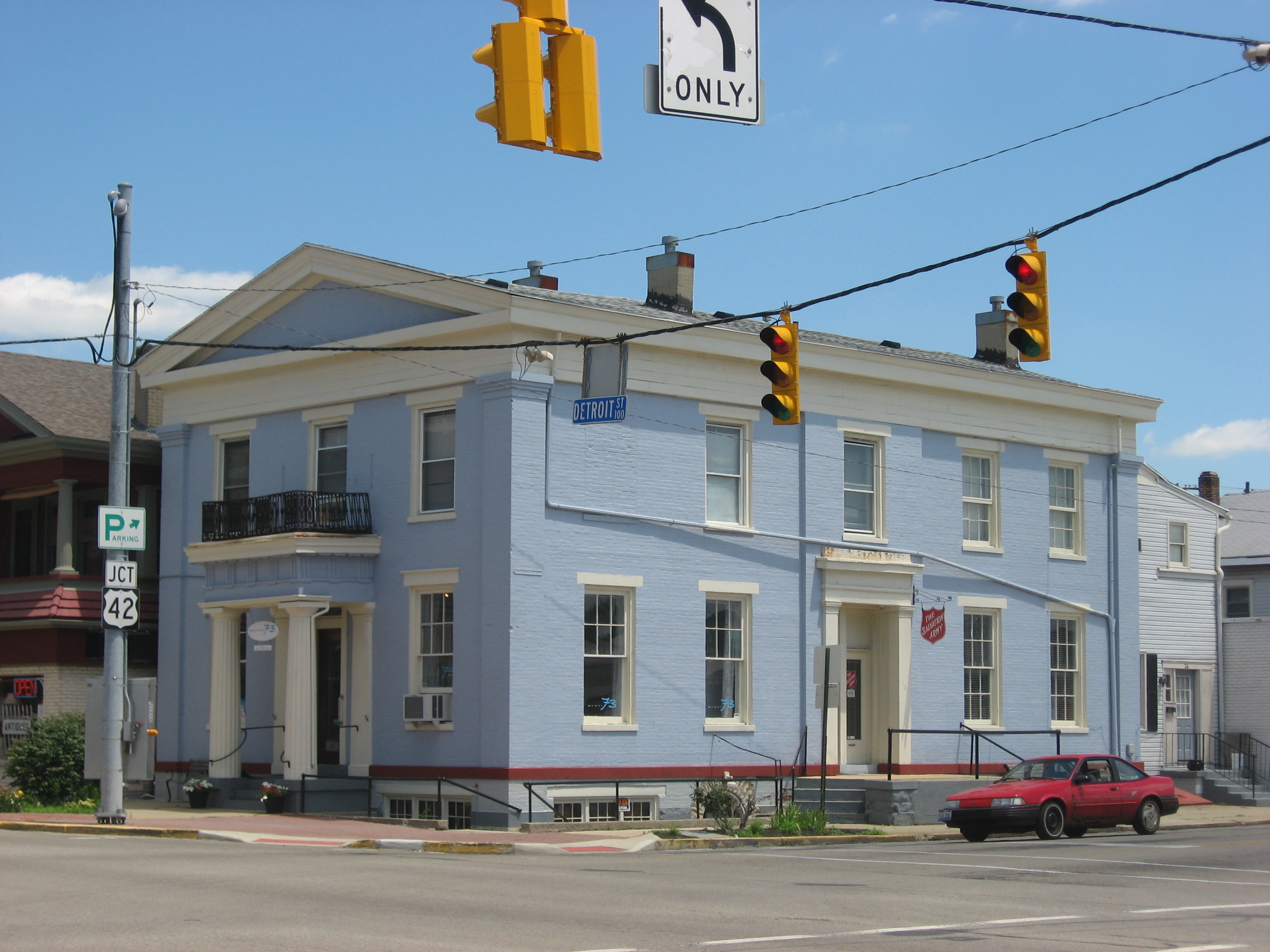
The Bank of Xenia, Ohio, 1835.

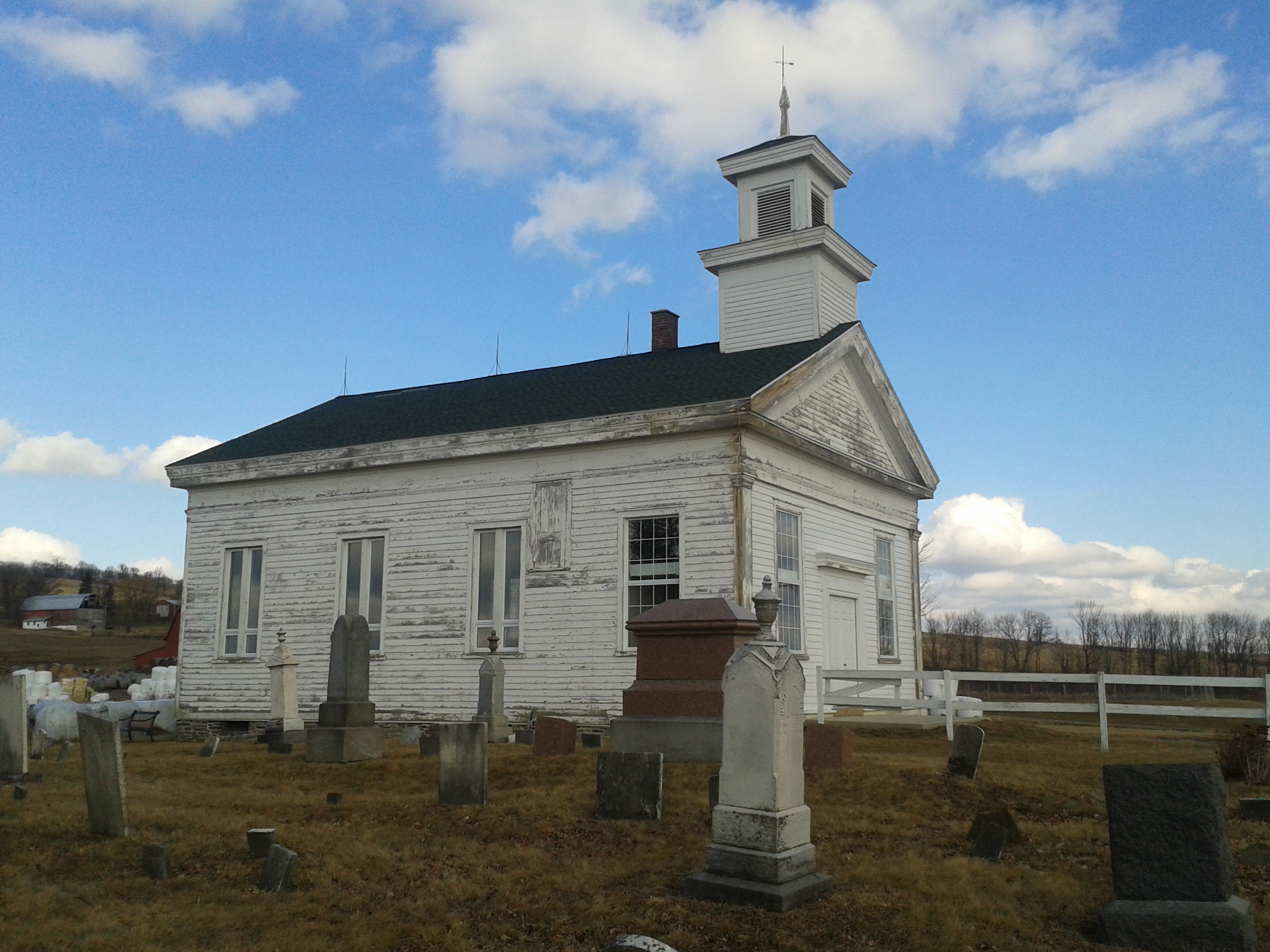
The Waits Methodist Episcopal Church in New York, 1853.

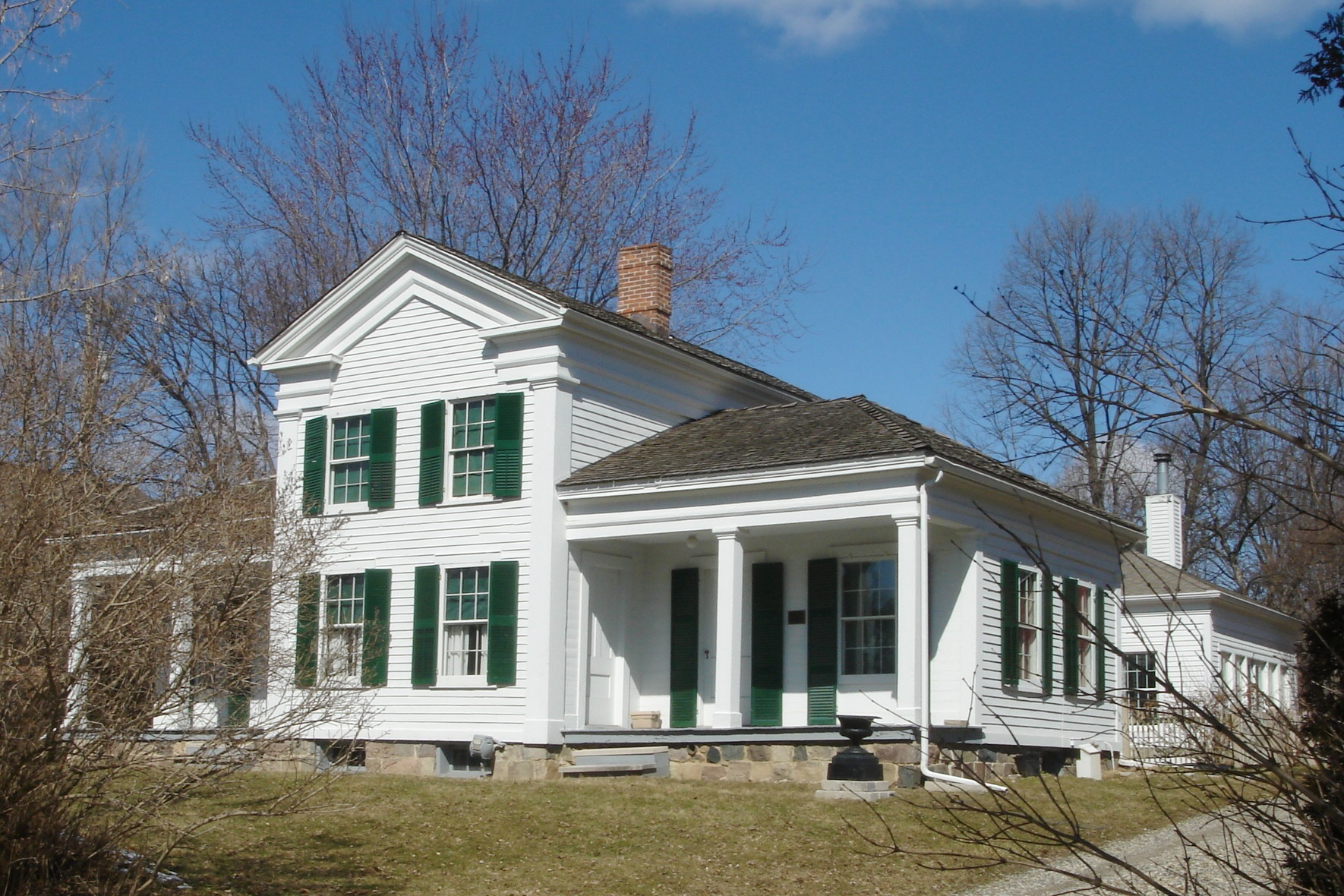
The Royal Aldrich House, Michigan, 1843.

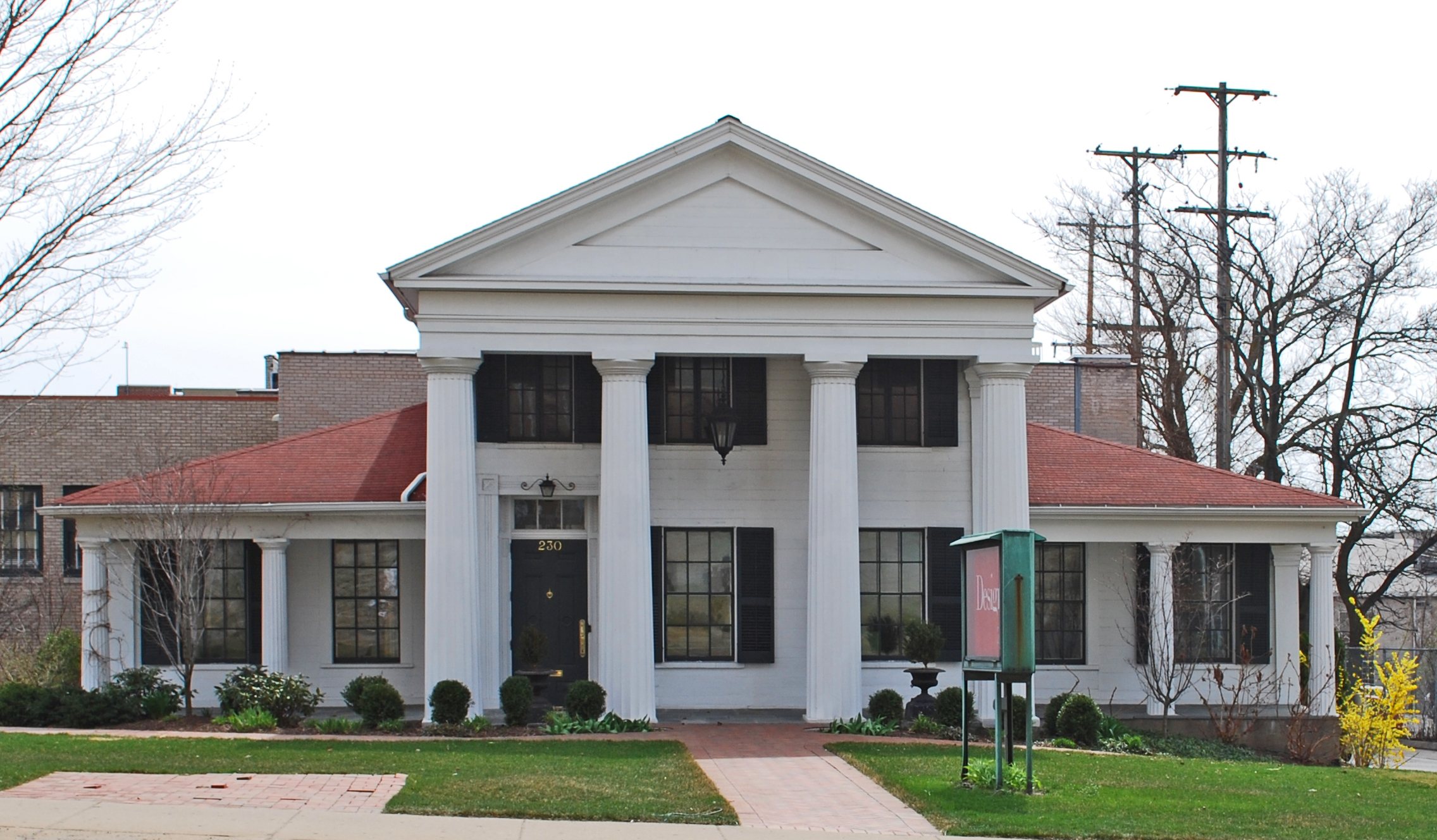
The Abram W. Pike House, Michigan, 1844.

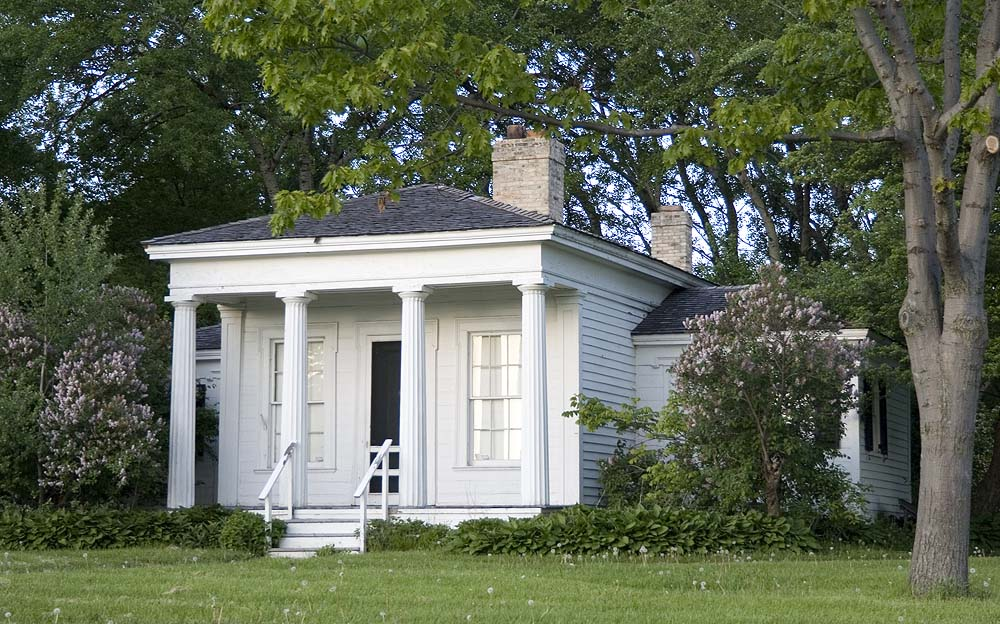
The Benjamin Church House, Wisconsin, 1844.

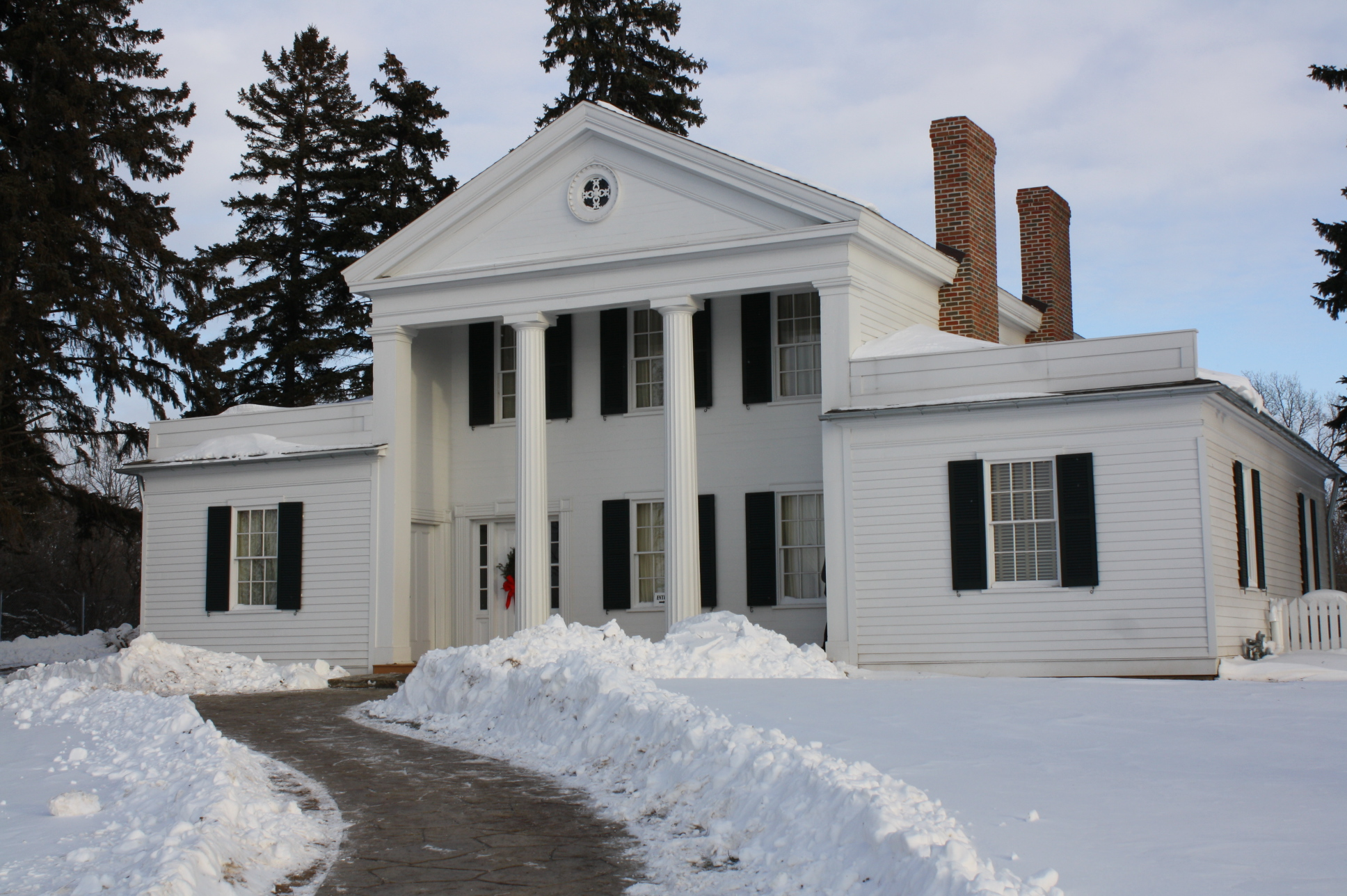
The Cotton House, Wisconsin, 1840.

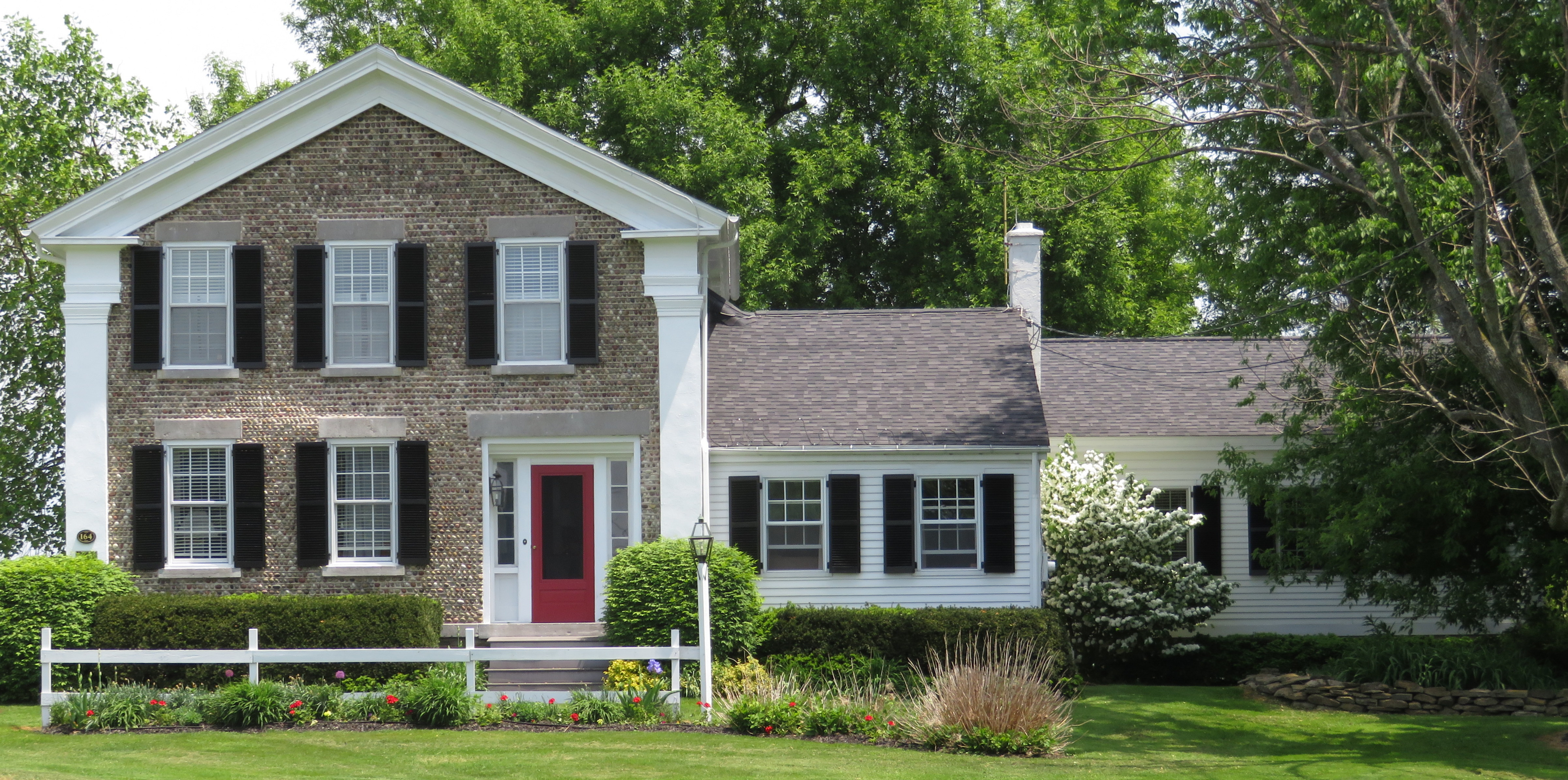
The Hamilton Farmstead in New York, a cobblestone example from 1848.

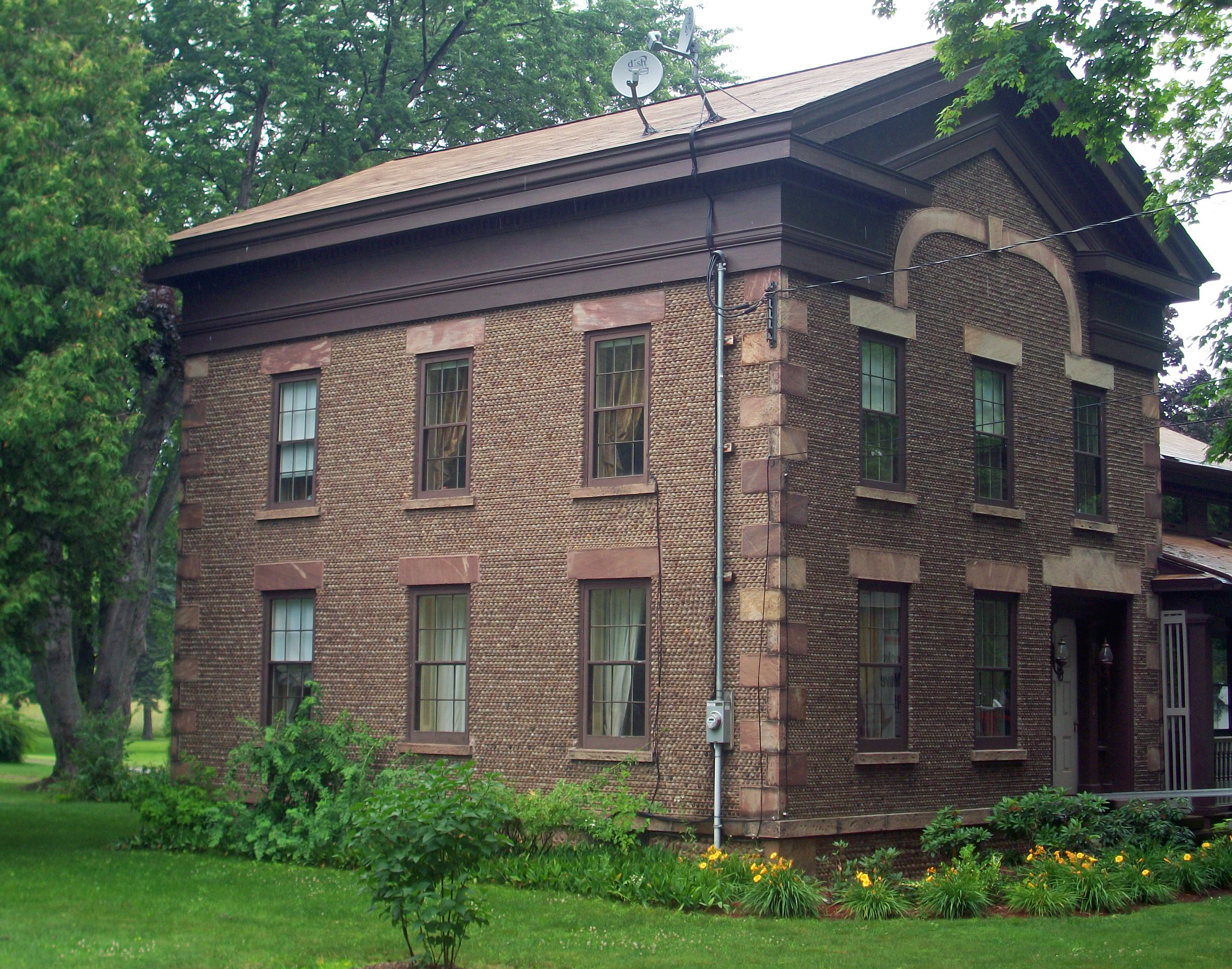
An additional cobblestone example in New York, 1846.

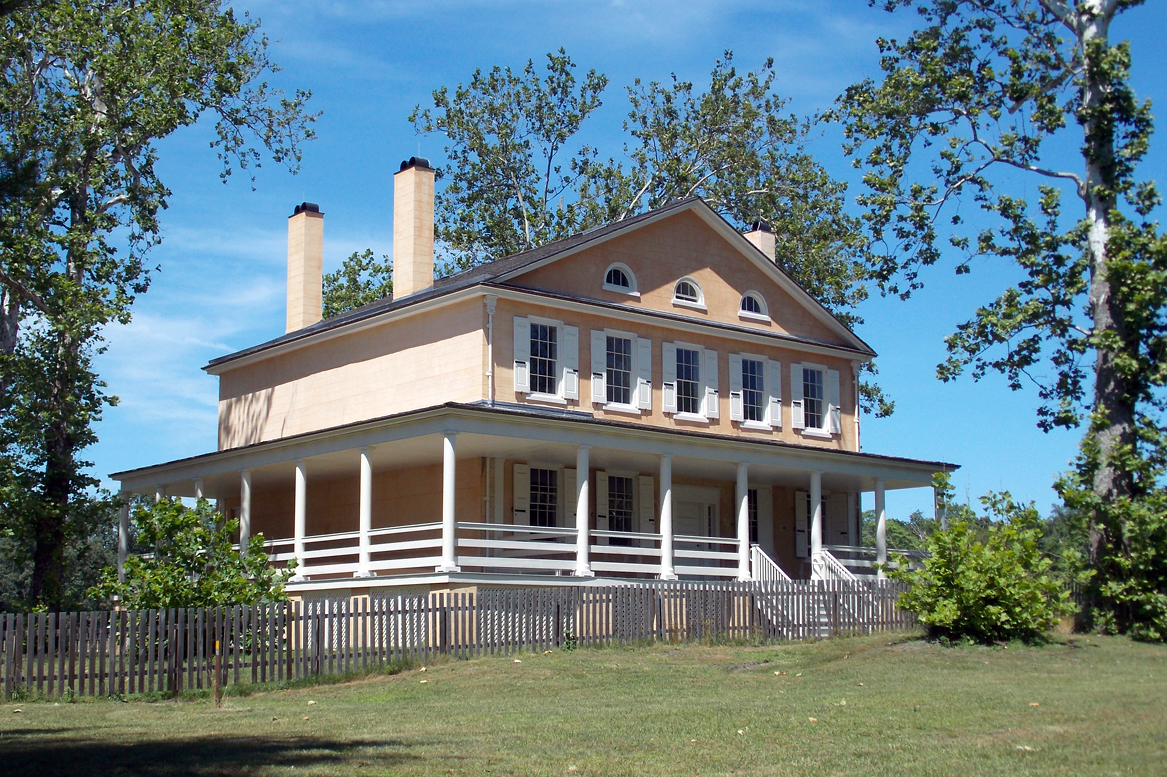
The Atsion Mansion in New Jersey completed in 1826, is an example of vernacular Greek Revival architecture.
