= George Murray House =

George Murray House may refer to:

- George Murray House (Park City, Utah), listed on the National Register of Historic Places in Summit County, Utah
- George Murray House (Racine, Wisconsin), listed on the National Register of Historic Places in Racine County, Wisconsin
