= First Congregational Church (Beloit, Wisconsin) =

Historic church in Wisconsin, United States

- U.S. National Register of Historic Places
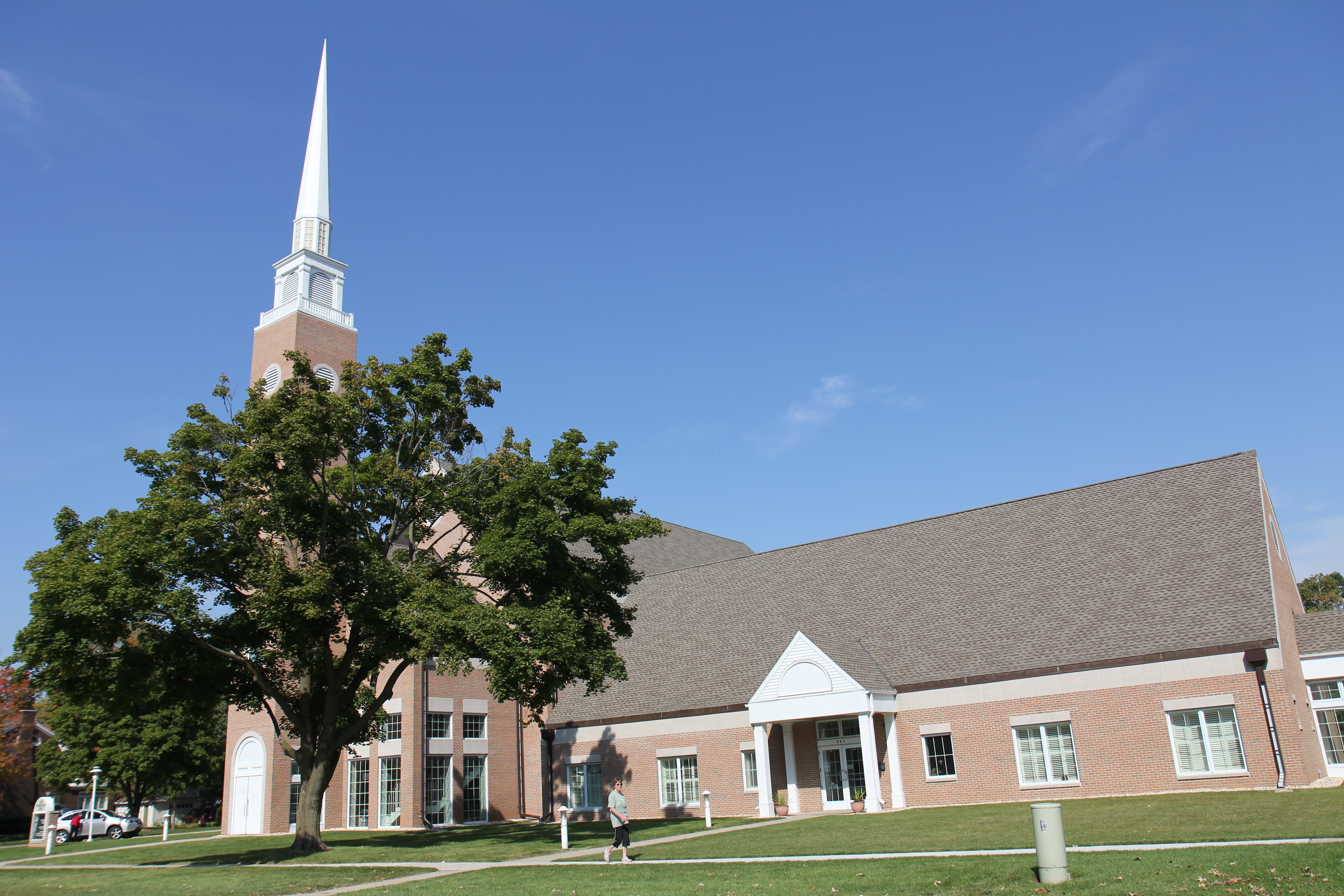
- Church in 2014

- Location within Wisconsin Location within the United States
- Location: 801 Bushnell St., Beloit, Wisconsin
- Coordinates: 42°30′6″N 89°1′40″W
- Area: less than one acre
- Built: 1862
- Architect: Lucas Bradley
- Architectural style: Greek Revival architecture, Romanesque architecture
- NRHP reference No.: 75000078
- Added to NRHP: January 23, 1975

First Congregational Church in Beloit, Wisconsin was built in 1859 from a design by Lucas Bradley, blending elements from Greek Revival and Romanesque Revival styles. It was added to the National Register of Historic Places for its architectural significance on January 23, 1975. On August 24, 1998, the historic building was damaged by fire, after which it was razed and replaced with a new building, which is pictured.
