= Lucas Bradley =

American architect (1809–1889)

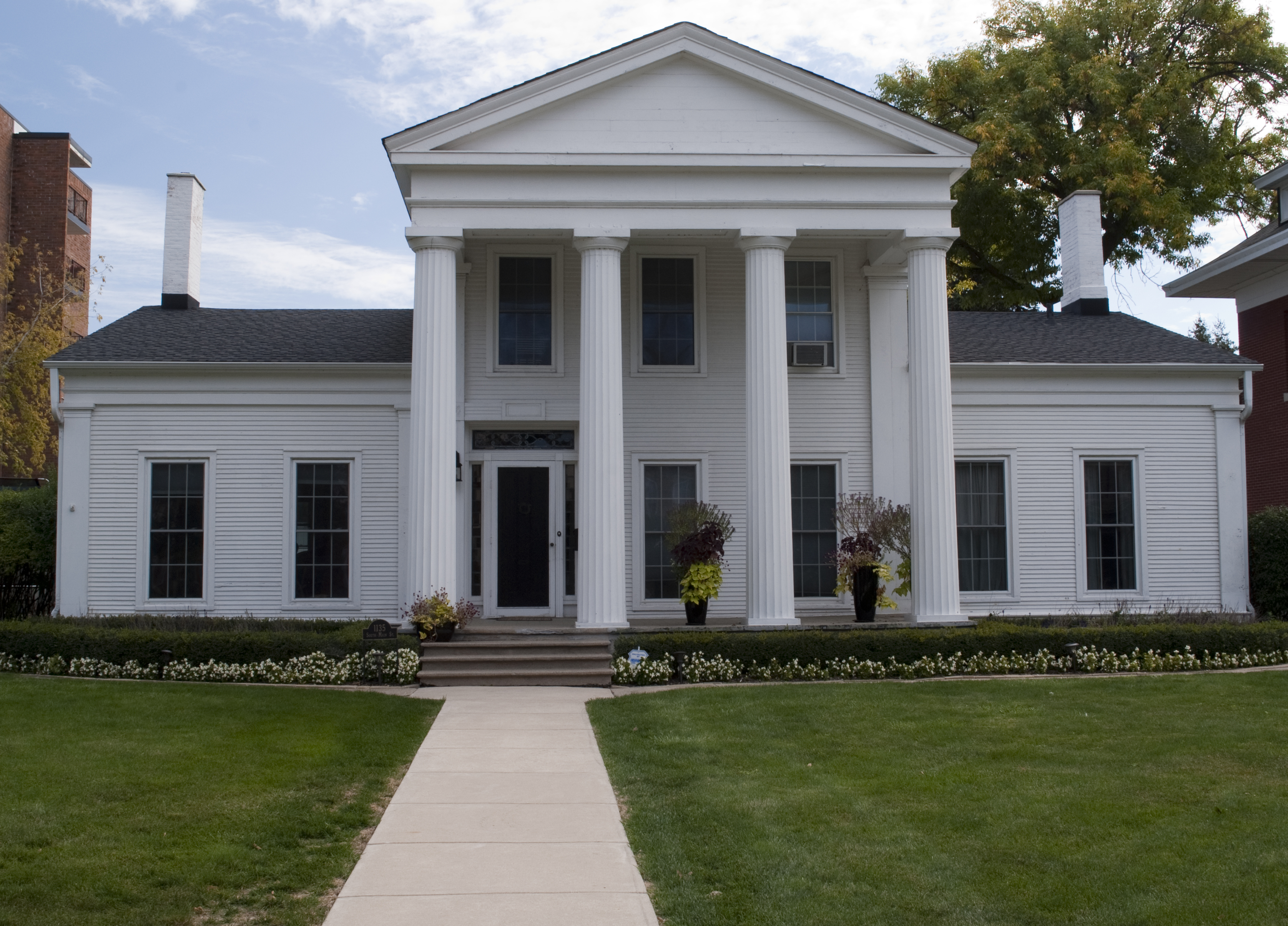
Eli R. Cooley House in Racine, Wisconsin

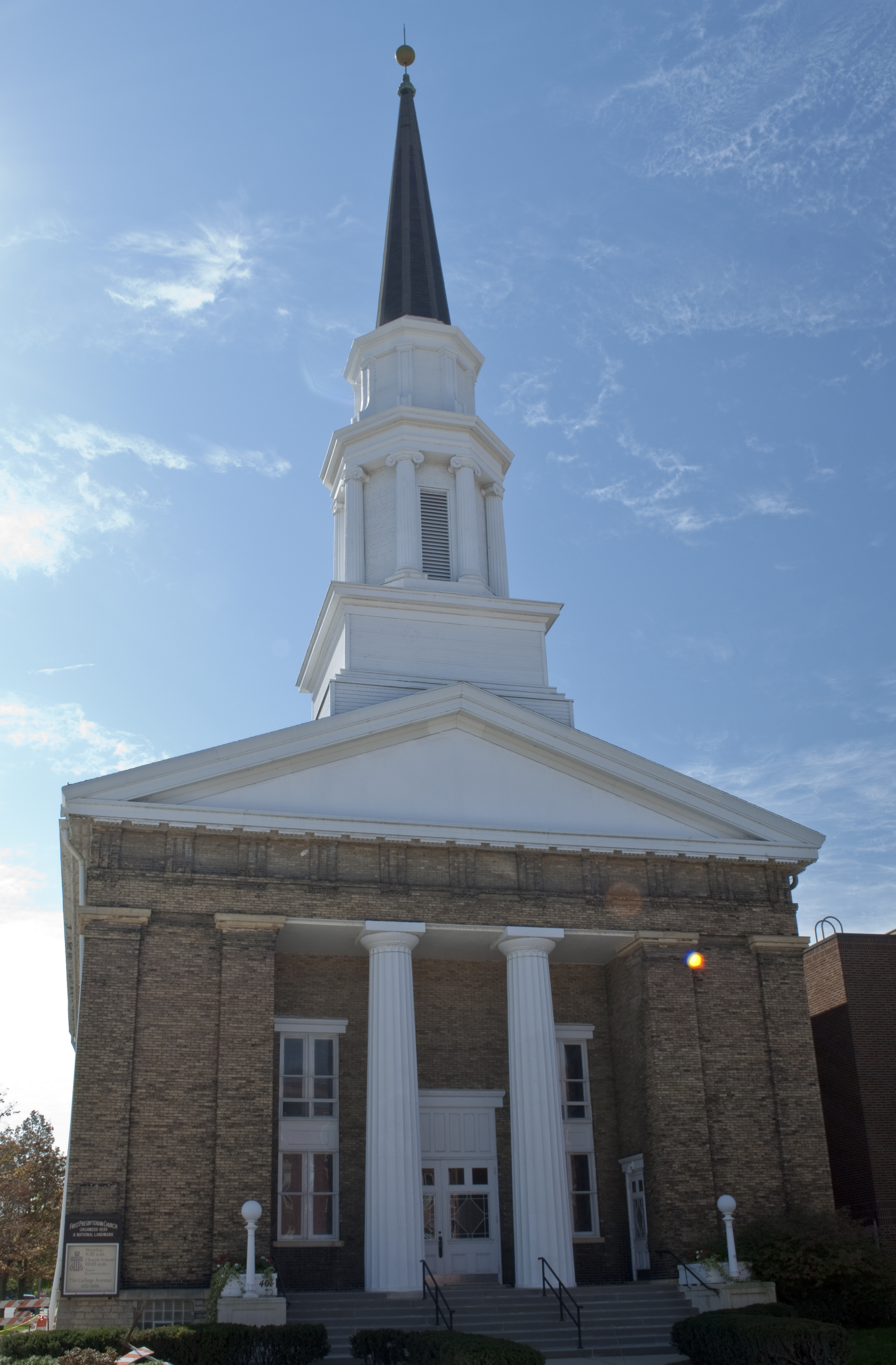
First Presbyterian Church (Racine, Wisconsin)

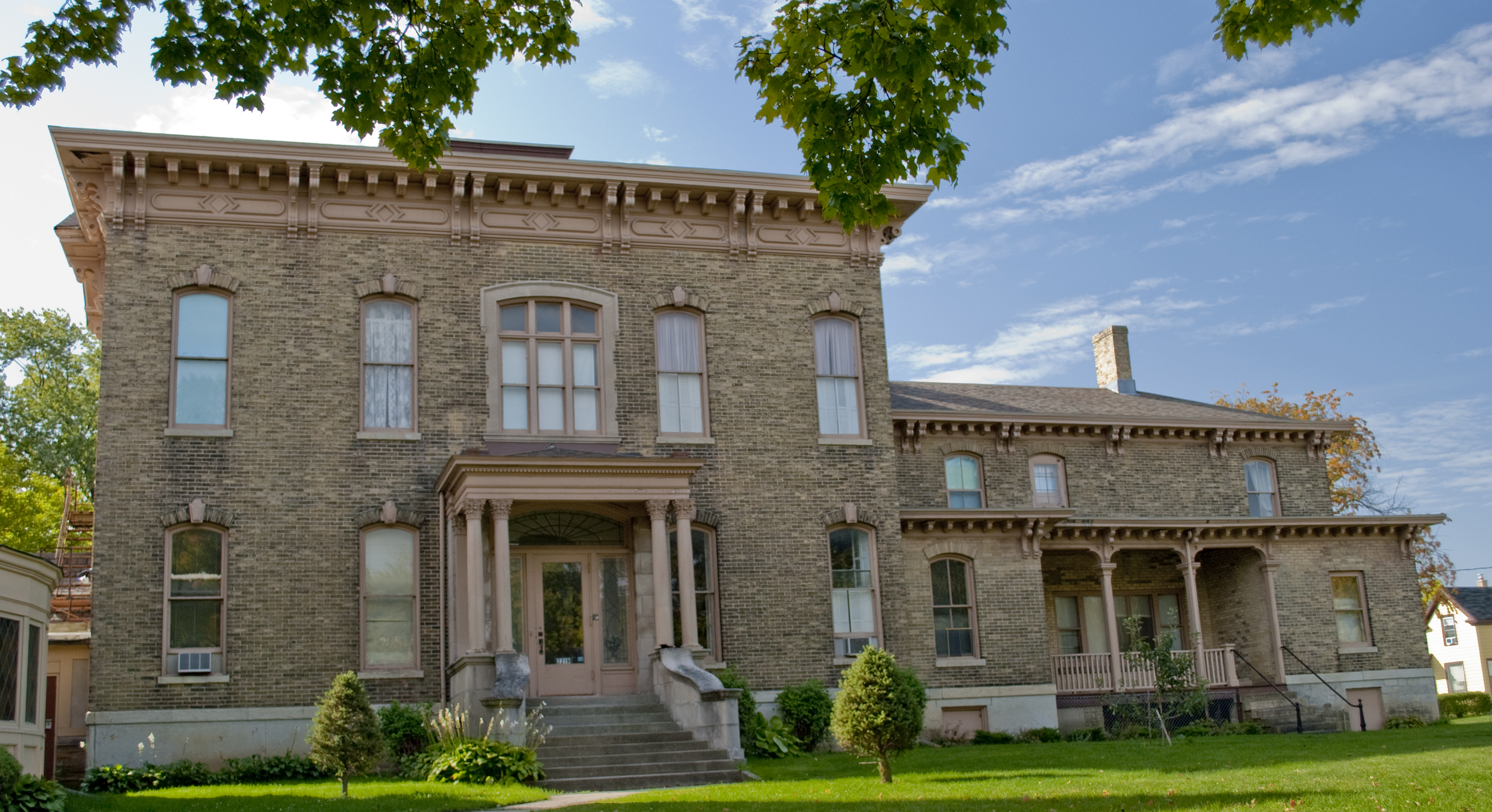
George Murray House (Racine, Wisconsin)

Lucas Bradley (1809–1889) was an American architect in Racine, Wisconsin. He designed the Eli R. Cooley House in Racine, Wisconsin, the John Collins House, George Murray House (Racine, Wisconsin) and Racine College.

Bradley was born in Geneva, New York. He apprenticed at Auburn, New York, lived in St. Louis and then moved to Racine in 1843. He is known for designing the Second Presbyterian Church of St. Louis and the First Presbyterian Church in Racine, notable examples of Greek Revival architecture.

He died at his home in Racine.

== Work ==
- Second Presbyterian Church (St. Louis, Missouri)
- Eli R. Cooley House in Racine
- Aaron Lucius Chapin House (1851) at 709 College Avenue in Beloit
- First Presbyterian Church (Racine, Wisconsin) (1852) at 716 College Avenue in Racine
- First Congregational Church of Beloit (1862) at 801 Bushnell Street in Beloit, Wisconsin (destroyed by fire 1998)
- George Murray House (Racine, Wisconsin) (1874) at 2219 Washington Avenue in Racine
- John Collins House, 6409 Nicholson Road in Caledonia, Wisconsin
- Three Garfield schools (later remodeled by James Gilbert Chandler)
- Bridge in Racine
- Second building for Racine College, the Kemper Building
- Campbell Hall for Beloit College
