= James Noble Sherwood House =

- U.S. National Register of Historic Places
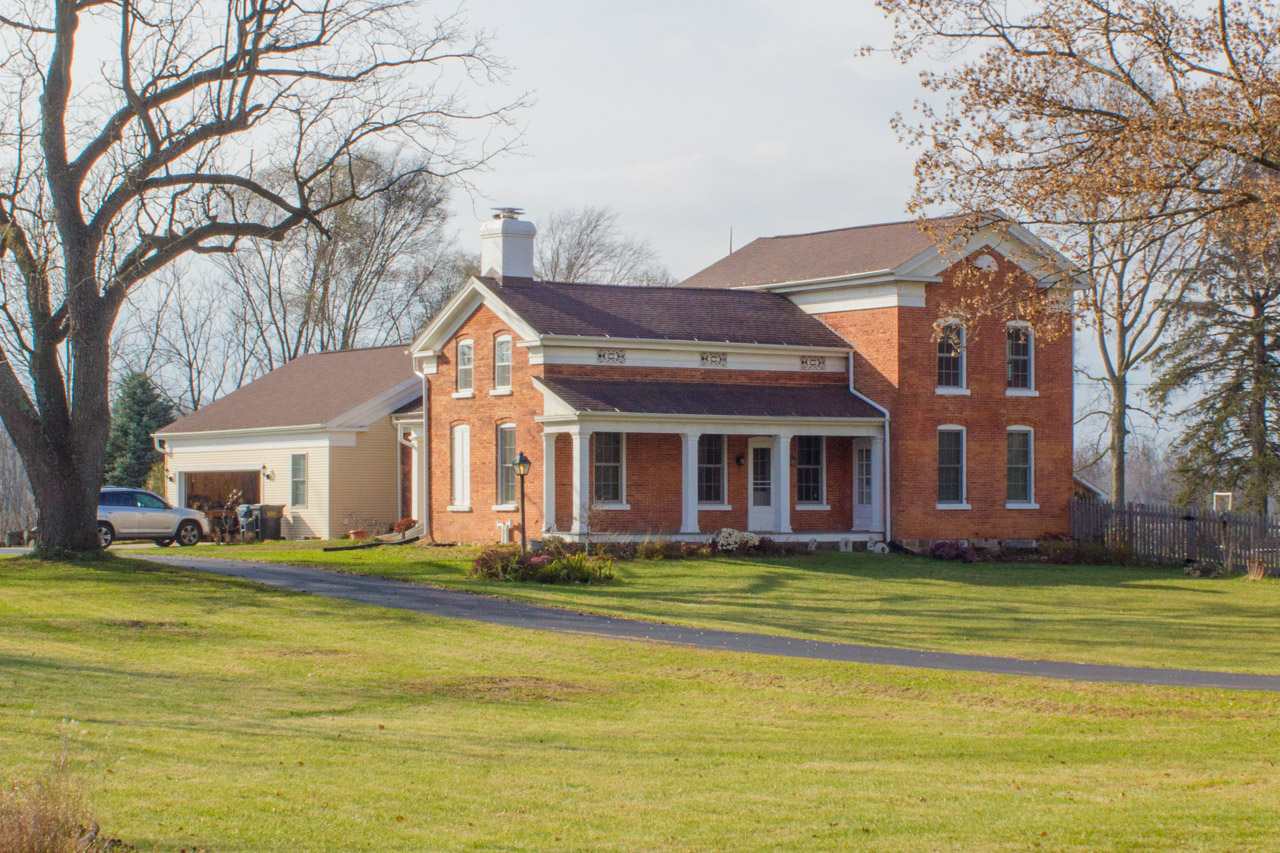

- Location within Michigan Location within the United States
- Interactive map
- Location: 768 Riverview Dr., Plainwell, Michigan
- Coordinates: 42°25′55″N 85°37′9″W
- Area: 3 acres (1.2 ha)
- Built: 1864
- Architectural style: Greek Revival
- NRHP reference No.: 84000507
- Added to NRHP: December 27, 1984

The James Noble Sherwood House is a private house located at 768 Riverview Drive in Plainwell, Michigan. It was listed on the National Register of Historic Places in 1984.

== History ==
In 1831, Hull Sherwood, originally from Brighton, New York moved to this area and purchased land along the Kalamazoo River, where he established a grist and sawmill. Lebbeus Sherwood, one of Hull's sons, also arrived in the area in 1831 with his family, and two years later he purchased this plot of land along the Kalamazoo River, where he constructed a frame house. With Lebbeus was his son, James Noble Sherwood, who was born in 1820. Lebbeus died of pneumonia in 1835 and the land passed to James.

James Noble Sherwood constructed this house in 1863-64, using local laborers. When James died in 1903, he passed the house and property to his own son, Edward Jay Sherwood. Upon Edward's death in 1934, the house was passed to his son Marion Sherwood. The house was sold by the Sherwood family in 1964.

== Description ==
The James Noble Sherwood House is a two-story brick Greek Revival house built in a gabled Upright and Wing form, with a single-story kitchen addition in the rear. A wide entablature extends around the house, with cornice returns at the gable ends. A wooden shed roof entrance porch runs along the front of the wing section, sheltering three six-over-six windows and a door. The gable end of the upright section has two six-over-six windows in each story, set in segmental-arch-head opening. Similar windows are set in the sides of the house.

On the interior, the first story contains a large parlor, a kitchen, dining room, and two small rooms which were likely originally bedrooms. A former pantry is now a bathroom. The second floor contains three bedrooms. The upper portion of the wing was originally a single room; it has been remodeled into a bedroom, bathroom, and storage space. The house contains The original white pine flooring throughout.
