= Sidney T. Smith House =

- Formerly listed on the U.S. National Register of Historic Places
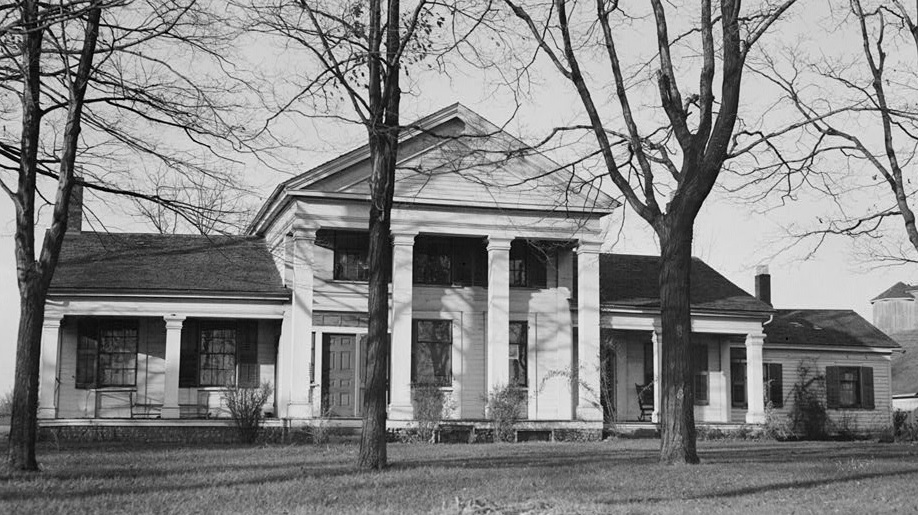
- Interactive map
- Location: 12880 Michigan Ave., Grass Lake, Michigan
- Coordinates: 42°15′24″N 84°10′41″W
- Area: 5 acres (2.0 ha)
- Built: 1840
- Architect: Sidney T. Smith
- Architectural style: Greek Revival
- Demolished: 1972
- NRHP reference No.: 72001590

Significant dates
- Added to NRHP: January 13, 1972
- Removed from NRHP: January 11, 1978

The Sidney T. Smith House was a farmhouse located at 12880 Michigan Avenue in Grass Lake, Michigan. It was listed on the National Register of Historic Places in 1972. However, the house was destroyed by fire in 1977, and removed in 1978 after its demolition.

== History ==
Sidney T. Smith was born in Chenango County, New York in 1809. He opened a store in Pulaski, New York, and married Harriet B. Wood. In 1839 Smith moved from Pulaski to this location in Grass Lake and opened a store in town. The Smiths constructed a log cabin in which to live. Smith soon designed and built this house. In the 1850s, Smith served as a state legislator. Smith died in 1878, and was survived by his wife. Sidney passed the house on to his youngest son Charles (born 1859), who was living there into the 1930s. The house was destroyed by fire in 1977.

== Description ==
The Sidney T. Smith House was a two-story tetrastyle Doric "temple front" Greek Revival structure, with single story wings on each side of the main massing. The house very much resembles the design shown in the 1833 pattern book, "Modern Builder's Guide," by Minard Lafever.
