= I.O.O.F. Hall (Garnavillo, Iowa) =

- U.S. National Register of Historic Places
- The building in 2021

- Location within Iowa Location within the United States
- Location: Centre St. Garnavillo, Iowa
- Coordinates: 42°52′5″N 91°14′10″W
- Area: less than one acre
- Built: 1860
- Architectural style: Greek Revival
- NRHP reference No.: 79000890
- Added to NRHP: June 18, 1979

The I.O.O.F. Hall, in Garnavillo, Iowa, also known as Garnavillo Lodge Hall, is a two-story building built in 1860. It served as a clubhouse for International Order of Odd Fellows and then later for Masons.

It was listed on the National Register of Historic Places in 1979.

In 1979 it was assessed to be historically significant as a "very nice example" of Greek Revival architecture, which is relatively rare in Iowa, and as a "very early" fraternal hall that was well-preserved.
