= Abram W. Pike House =

Historic house in Michigan, United States

- U.S. National Register of Historic Places
- Michigan State Historic Site
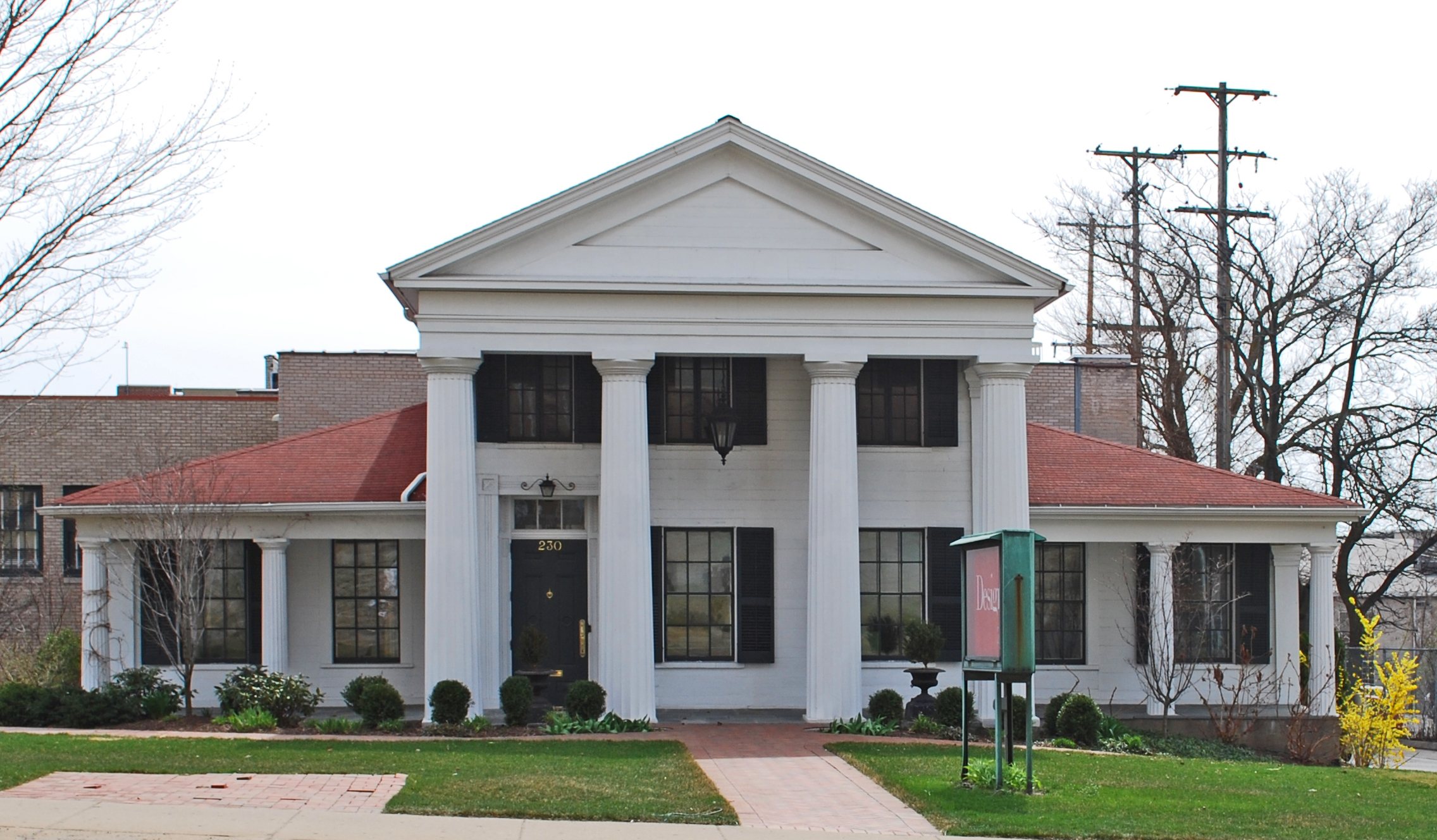

- Location within Michigan Location within the United States
- Interactive map
- Location: 230 Fulton Street East, Grand Rapids, Michigan; United States
- Coordinates: 42°57′42″N 85°39′47″W
- Built: 1844
- NRHP reference No.: 70000276
- Added to NRHP: July 8, 1970

The Abram W. Pike House is a historic home built in Grand Rapids, Michigan. Built in 1844, it is one of the oldest homes still standing in Michigan and is listed on the National Register of Historic Places. The home is named after its original occupier, Abram W. Pike. Pike was a fur trader who came to Michigan in 1827. He lived in Port Sheldon on Lake Michigan, at the mouth of the Pigeon River, and was employed as the company clerk for the Port Sheldon Land Company.

At the time, there were hopes that Port Sheldon would become a major metropolis. Though this vision was never fully realized, the Ottawa House Hotel was completed before the project's eventual financial ruin. The Ottawa House Hotel was only open for five years but was recognized as one of the most impressive buildings in Port Sheldon. When Abram Pike relocated to Grand Rapids in 1844, he had four of the six pillars from the grandiose Ottawa House Hotel drug by ox and attached to the front of his home, which now stands—unmistakably—at 230 E. Fulton Street.

The house was occupied as a family residence until 1922, upon which it was turned into the Grand Rapids Art Gallery (Now the Grand Rapids Art Museum) and remained so until the museum moved in 1978. In 2014, amidst building renovations, workers uncovered an original “Grand Rapids Art Museum” sign, painted in large, bold letters atop the entryway to the Pike House.

In 2014, the Pike House was purchased by Grand Rapids bankruptcy law firm, Keller & Almassian, PLC, which remains in the property today.

== Historical connections ==
=== Abram W Pike and the Port Sheldon Land Company ===
Abram Pike came from Ohio to serve as the company clerk for the Port Sheldon Land Company. Pike was a businessman and fur trader. He was known for his friendly relations and business dealings with Native Americans and spoke a few different local dialects. Port Sheldon was expected to become a great metropolis of the 'West' by capitalizing on the location's abundance of natural resources and the prevalence of the shipping industry on Lake Michigan. A notable, completed work of Port Sheldon was the Ottawa House Hotel. The grandiose hotel opened its doors in 1839. By 1847 the structure was being pillaged for lumber and firewood. Port Sheldon had gone bankrupt. After staying behind to sell off the company's remaining assets, Pike then dragged, by Ox, four of the six pillars from the front of the Ottawa House Hotel to Grand Rapids where he constructed his residence at 230 East Fulton.

=== Emily Clark and the Grand Rapids Art Museum ===
Emily Jewell married Melvin J. Clark in 1861 in Solon Township, West Michigan. The two quickly rose to prominence in the Grand Rapids business and socialite community. Mrs. Clark is known to this day for her many philanthropic contributions to the Grand Rapids community and surrounding area. In 1920, Mrs. Clark purchased the Pike House with intent to bequeath the property to the Art Association of Grand Rapids, misplaced of a permanent home for their gallery. In 1922 230 E. Fulton became the first Grand Rapids Art Gallery, known today as the Grand Rapids Art Museum (GRAM), and remained so until the Museum relocated in 1978.

== Architectural description ==
Date of construction: 1844

Architectural significance: Four large white columns on the front exterior of the house. Antebellum Greek Revival style architecture.

Dorothy Pratt said of 230 E Fulton in "A Guide to Early American Homes": "This is one of the outstanding Greek Revival houses in Michigan, built by Abram Pike and occupied as a family residence until 1922."

== Mathias Alten discovery ==
In 2014, during building renovations, a large painted sign reading "Grand Rapids Art Museum" was uncovered across the top of the exterior entryway to the building. The granddaughter of Mathias Alten, still residing in the area, visited the property to say that the sign was painted by her grandfather when he was a young man, new to Grand Rapids. Mathias Alten would go on to become a painter of Grand Rapids and West Michigan, adding to the significance of this discovery in the history and art communities.

== Timeline ==
- 1842 – Port Sheldon Company declared bankrupt
- 1844 – Abram Pike constructs a residence at 230 E. Fulton
- 1844–1922 – 230 E. Fulton is occupied as the Pike's family residence.
- 1920 – Emily Clark donates $50,000 to fund the purchase of 230 E. Fulton as the first permanent location for the Grand Rapids Art Gallery, now Grand Rapids Art Museum.
- 1924 – Grand Rapids Art Gallery opens
- 1928 – Construction, 1st addition to house completed
- 1930 – 2nd edition completed
- 1978 – Grand Rapids Art Gallery moves out of 230 E. Fulton
- 1985 – Design Quest furniture purchases Pike House
- 1990 – J.T. French Co. furniture design resource center purchases Pike House
- 2009 – Design Plus Inc. Architects purchases Pike House
- 2014 – Keller & Almassian, PLC purchases Pike House
