= Delano Farms =

- William S. Delano House
- U.S. National Register of Historic Places
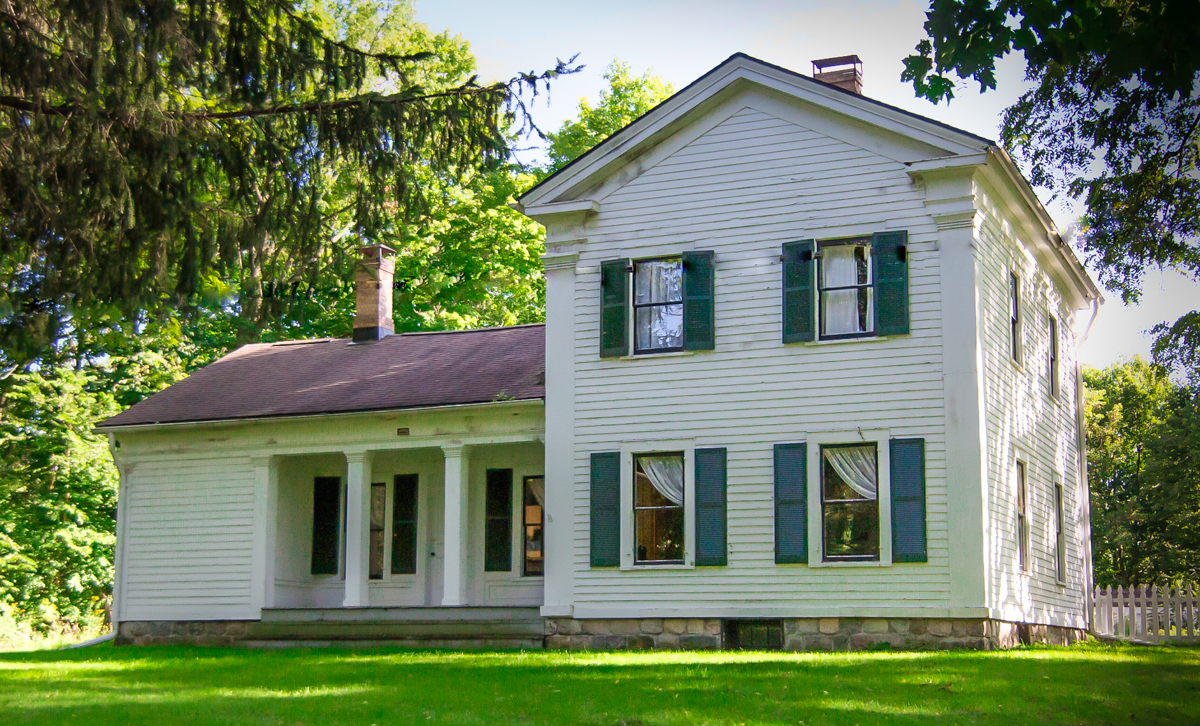
- Interactive map
- Location: 555 W. E Ave., N of Kalamazoo, Michigan
- Coordinates: 42°21′42″N 85°35′51″W
- Area: 15 acres (6.1 ha)
- Built: 1858
- Built by: William DeLano
- Architectural style: Greek Revival
- NRHP reference No.: 79001157
- Added to NRHP: August 9, 1979

DeLano Farms is a working educational farm, located at 555 West E Avenue, north of Kalamazoo, Michigan. The farm is the western portion of the Kalamazoo Nature Center, and contains the historic William S. Delano House and associated farmstead. The house was listed on the National Register of Historic Places in 1979.

This historical site contains a CSA garden and a network of trails. The farm and trails are open to members of the Kalamazoo Nature Center.

== History ==
William S. DeLano moved to this area from western New York in 1838. He began purchasing farmland in 1843, and by 1854 owned over 100 acres. In 1858, he constructed the house on the property. The farm was prosperous, and by 1880 DeLano had acquired 235 acres. William S. DeLano died in 1901, pand he passed the farm to his youngest son, Orlyn J. DeLano, and his wife Myrtice. Orlyn lived in the house until his death in 1956, and Myrtice DeLano lived there until her own death in 1963. The house greatly deteriorated after her death, and the farmstead was purchased by the Kalamazoo Nature Center in 1968. The buildings were restored and the house opened in 1975 as an historic house museum.

== Description ==
The William S. DeLano House is a modest, L-plan, Greek Revival house clad with clapboarded. The house sits on a rubblestone foundation, and is constructed using the mortise-and-tenon framing - a technique which was becoming old-fashioned even at the time of construction. The house consists of a two-story block attached to a 1-1/2 story. A recessed porch with square-column supports fronts the wing, covering the main entrance. Greek Revival-style trim includes corner pilasters, a broad architrave and frieze strips, and a heavy classical cornice with returns.
