= Eli R. Cooley House =

Historic house in Wisconsin, United States

- U.S. National Register of Historic Places
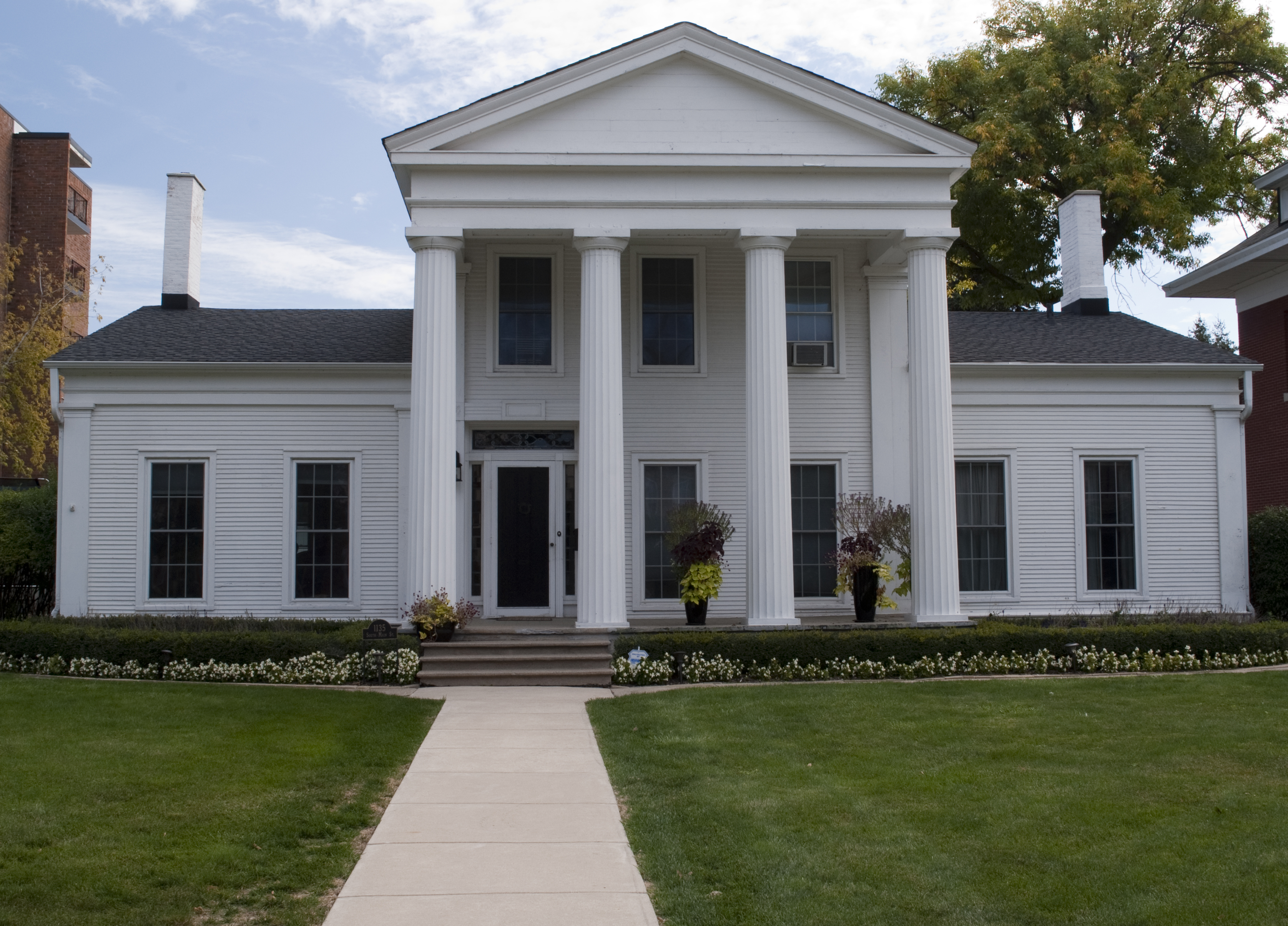

- Location within Wisconsin Location within the United States
- Location: 1135 S. Main St. Racine, Wisconsin
- Coordinates: 42°43′8″N 87°46′55″W
- Area: 0.15 acres (0.061 ha)
- Built: c. 1852
- Architect: Lucas Bradley
- Architectural style: Greek Revival
- NRHP reference No.: 73000273
- Added to NRHP: April 11, 1973

The Eli R. Cooley House is a Greek Revival-styled house built in the early 1850s in Racine, Wisconsin. It was listed on the National Register of Historic Places in 1973 and has been described as "Wisconsin's finest remaining Greek Revival residence."

The Cooley house was begun in 1851, designed by Racine-based architect Lucas Bradley. The front of the 2-story central block especially resembles a Greek Temple, with its portico consisting of four colossal fluted Doric columns supporting a simple entablature and pediment. A 1 1/2-story wing extends from each side of the main block. The corners are trimmed with pilasters, and the windows are tall, 3x4 panes. The house is clad in clapboard. A tall masonry chimney rises from the central block and one from the end of each wing. All is symmetric except the entry door, which is offset to the left.

Inside the front door is a hall which runs from front to back. The north wing holds a drawing room with a white marble fireplace, plaster cornice, and wooden door and window frames. The rest of the first floor contains sitting rooms, a dining room, and kitchen. Bedrooms are upstairs.

The house was built by John McHenry, a grocer. Eli Cooley lived there; he was a hardware merchant and third mayor of Racine. O. Jennings lived in the house in 1858, and E.C. Deane in 1893. Judge Charles E. Dyer also lived there. By 1942 the house was in "deplorable condition," when William and Amanda Kuehneman bought it and carefully restored it.
