= First Presbyterian Church (Racine, Wisconsin) =

Historic church in Wisconsin, United States

- U.S. National Register of Historic Places
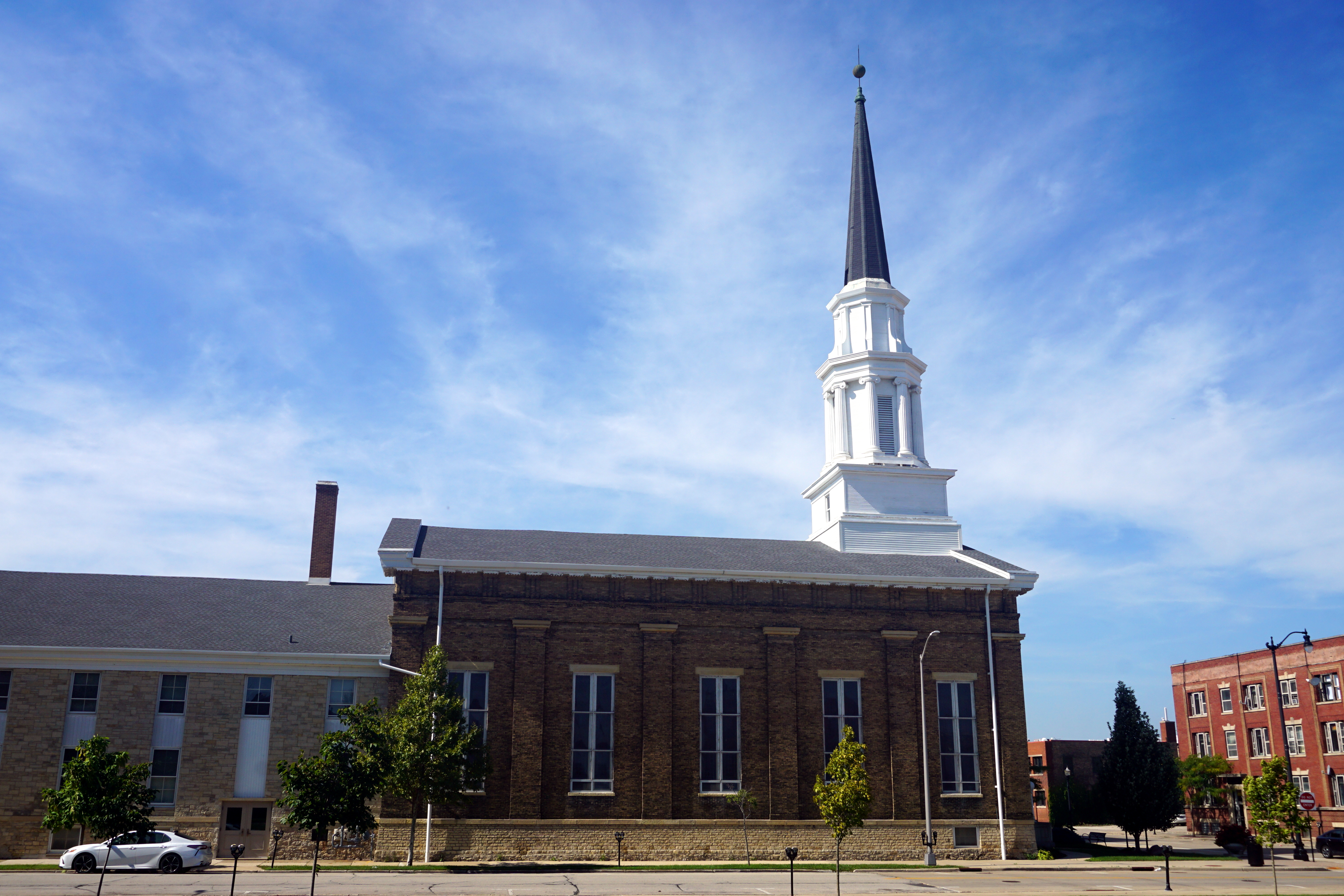

- Location within Wisconsin Location within the United States
- Location: 716 College Ave., Racine, Wisconsin
- Coordinates: 42°43′32″N 87°47′7″W
- Area: 0.3 acres (0.12 ha)
- Built: 1852
- Architect: Lucas Bradley
- Architectural style: Greek Revival
- NRHP reference No.: 73000093
- Added to NRHP: March 20, 1973

First Presbyterian Church is a historic church at 716 College Avenue in Racine, Wisconsin, United States. It was built in 1852 and was added to the National Register of Historic Places in 1973. It was designed by Lucas Bradley.

== History ==
The First Presbyterian Church was among the first religious institutions to be created in Racine. The church was founded in 1839, two years prior to the official incorporation of the village of Racine. In its first years, it frequently outgrew its established meeting places: first a schoolhouse on Main Street between Second and Third Streets, then the unoccupied upper floor of the town jail. The congregation's first church building was dedicated in February 1843. In 1850 the congregation's pastor, the Reverend T.M. Hopkins, and later his successor Rev. Z.M. Humphrey, solicited funds to construct a larger house of worship on the southern edge of the city. The building's cornerstone was laid at 7th Street and College Avenue on May 6, 1851, and the finished building was dedicated June 10, 1852.

The building was designed in a Greek Revival style by architect and church elder Lucas Bradley. Several women in the congregation provided room and board to the builders who constructed the church. The total cost of construction was totaled at $10,600, on top of the $1,200 paid for the land. The church holds 156 pews, 138 on the ground floor and 18 in the balcony. A bell was added to the tower in 1855, which doubled as the city's fire alarm. The church's current organ was purchased in 1886.
