= George Murray House (Racine, Wisconsin) =

Historic house in Wisconsin, United States

- U.S. National Register of Historic Places
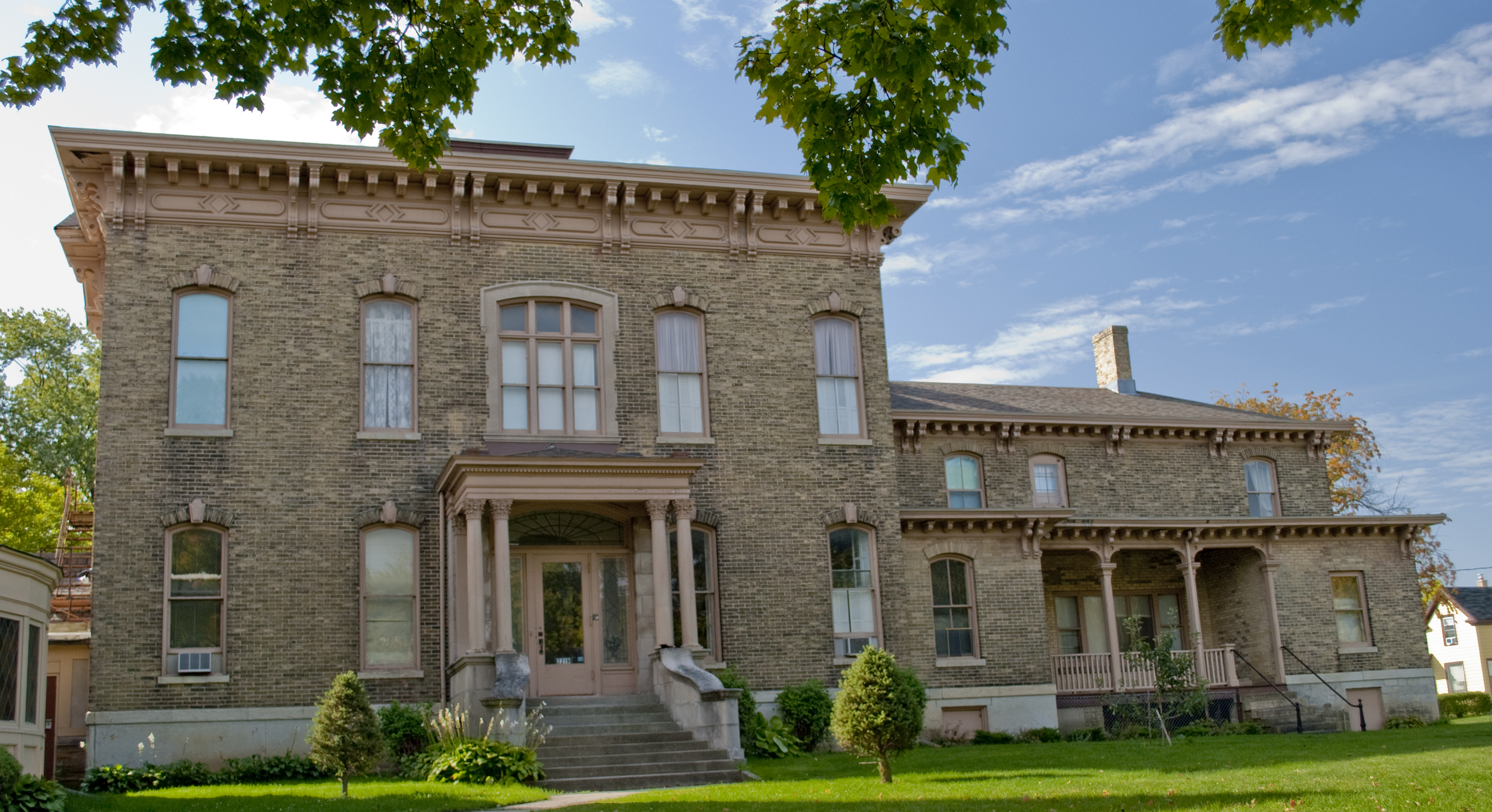

- Location within Wisconsin Location within the United States
- Location: 2219 Washington Avenue, Racine, Wisconsin
- Coordinates: 42°42′49″N 87°48′21″W
- Area: 2.03 acres (0.82 ha)
- Built: 1874
- Architect: Lucas Bradley
- Architectural style: Italianate
- NRHP reference No.: 79000104
- Added to NRHP: June 6, 1979

The George Murray House (also known as the Our Savior's Lutheran Church Parish House) is a historic house built in 1874 in Racine, Wisconsin. It was added to the National Register of Historic Places on June 6, 1979. It is locally significant as one of the finest Italianate residences to be built in the Racine area during the 19th century.

== Description and history ==
Completed in 1874, the two-story, hipped-roofed house was originally built for Scottish immigrant George Murray and was designed by architect Lucas Bradley. An article in the Advocate of April 25, 1874, notes that "the piazza takes in the principle portion of the elaborate finish, running the full width of the building, and at the different angles and entrance stand Corinthian columns on ornamental pedestals two and a half feet high and the whole surmounted by cast iron capitals."

George Murray came to Racine from Scotland in 1850, became a partner with Daniel Slauson in his lumber, lath and shingle business, and married his daughter in 1855. Mrs. Murray inherited the land on which the house was built from her father in 1865. It was purchased by Our Savior's Lutheran Church for $38,000 in 1949. It served as the home for the church's pastors and their families until 1961. The house continues to be used by the church for a variety purposes.
