= Wilmanor Apartments =

- U.S. National Register of Historic Places
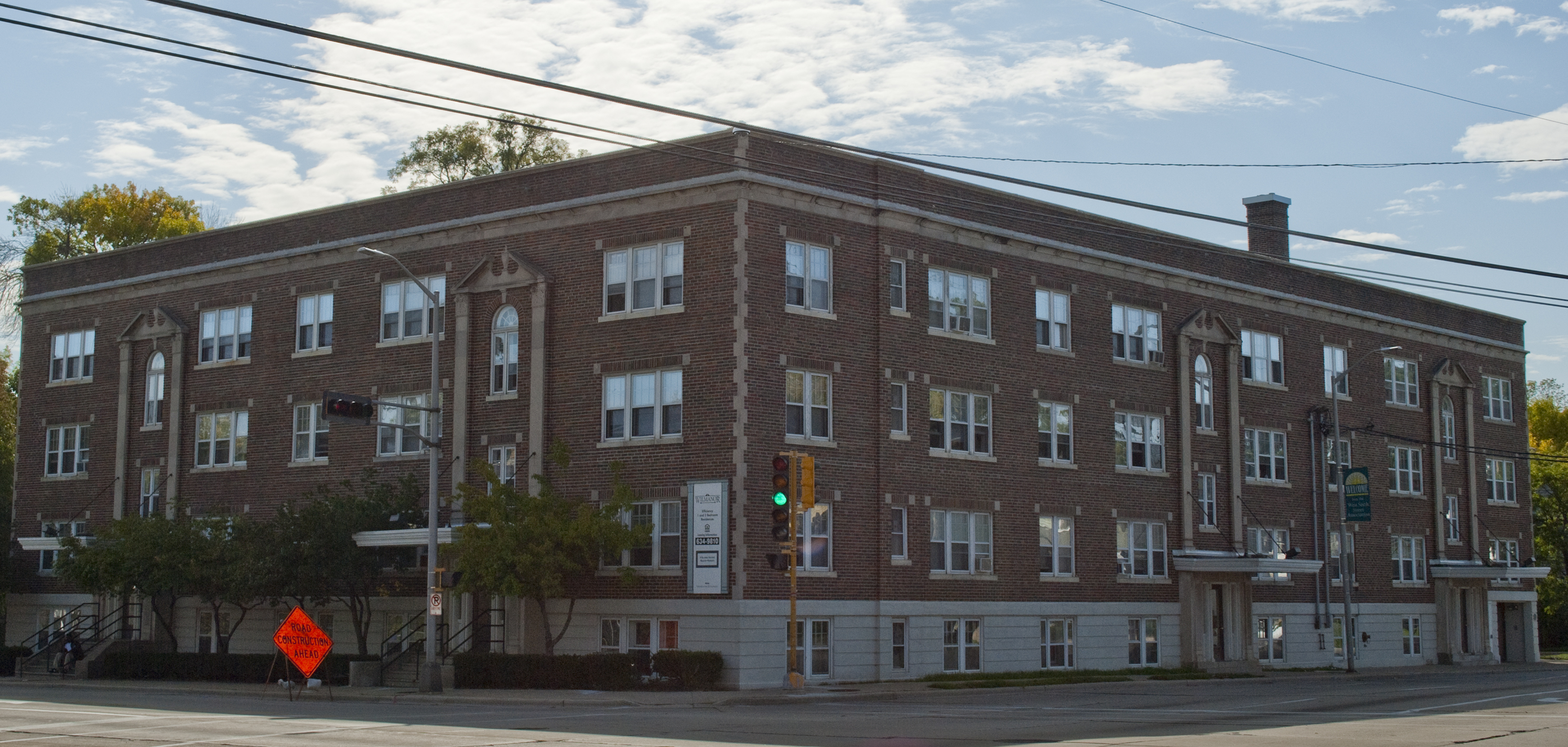
- Wilmanor Apartments
- Location: 1419-29 West Sixth Street; 253-55 North Memorial Drive; Racine, Wisconsin
- Coordinates: 42.725556°N 87.798611°W
- Built: 1928
- Architect: J. Mandor Matson
- Architectural style: Colonial Revival, Georgian Revival
- NRHP reference No.: 94000649
- Added to NRHP: June 24, 1994

Wilmanor Apartments is an apartment building in Racine, Wisconsin, located at the corner of West Sixth Street and North Memorial Drive. As a well-preserved example of a large residential building from the 1920s, Wilmanor is listed on the National Register of Historic Places. The three-story, U-shaped brick building consists of thirty-seven apartment units surrounding a central courtyard. These units are distributed across six separately self-contained areas, each of which has its own separate entrance from the street.

== History ==
Wilmanor Apartments was a project of William M. Christensen, a Racine developer whose construction company was also building Washington Park High School at the time. Christensen intended to capitalize on the growing demand for apartments in Racine, which existed in and near downtown but not in the more desirable western residential neighborhoods where Wilmanor would be built. J. Mandor Matson, who had designed both Park and Horlick high schools, was hired as the project's architect. Wilmanor was Racine's second large apartment building, following Bull Manor (part of the Southside Historic District), which had also been designed by Matson and was completed in 1925. The building opened to the public for the first time on July 26, 1929, advertised as Racine's largest and most modern apartment building and as featuring state-of-the-art amenities.

As newer and more modern apartment complexes were built in the post-World War II era, Wilmanor became overshadowed and its surrounding neighborhood entered into decades of economic decline. By 1993, when plans for a major redevelopment were first being proposed, a city official described the building as "a physical and moral blight on the city of Racine". Although he considered tearing the building down after purchasing it, developer Randall Alexander ultimately led a major renovation effort that remodeled the building, finishing early in 1995. This renovation was considered a success and part of a wider resurgence in the West Sixth Street neighborhood.
