= Southside Historic District (Racine, Wisconsin) =

Historic district in Wisconsin, United States

- U.S. National Register of Historic Places
- U.S. Historic district
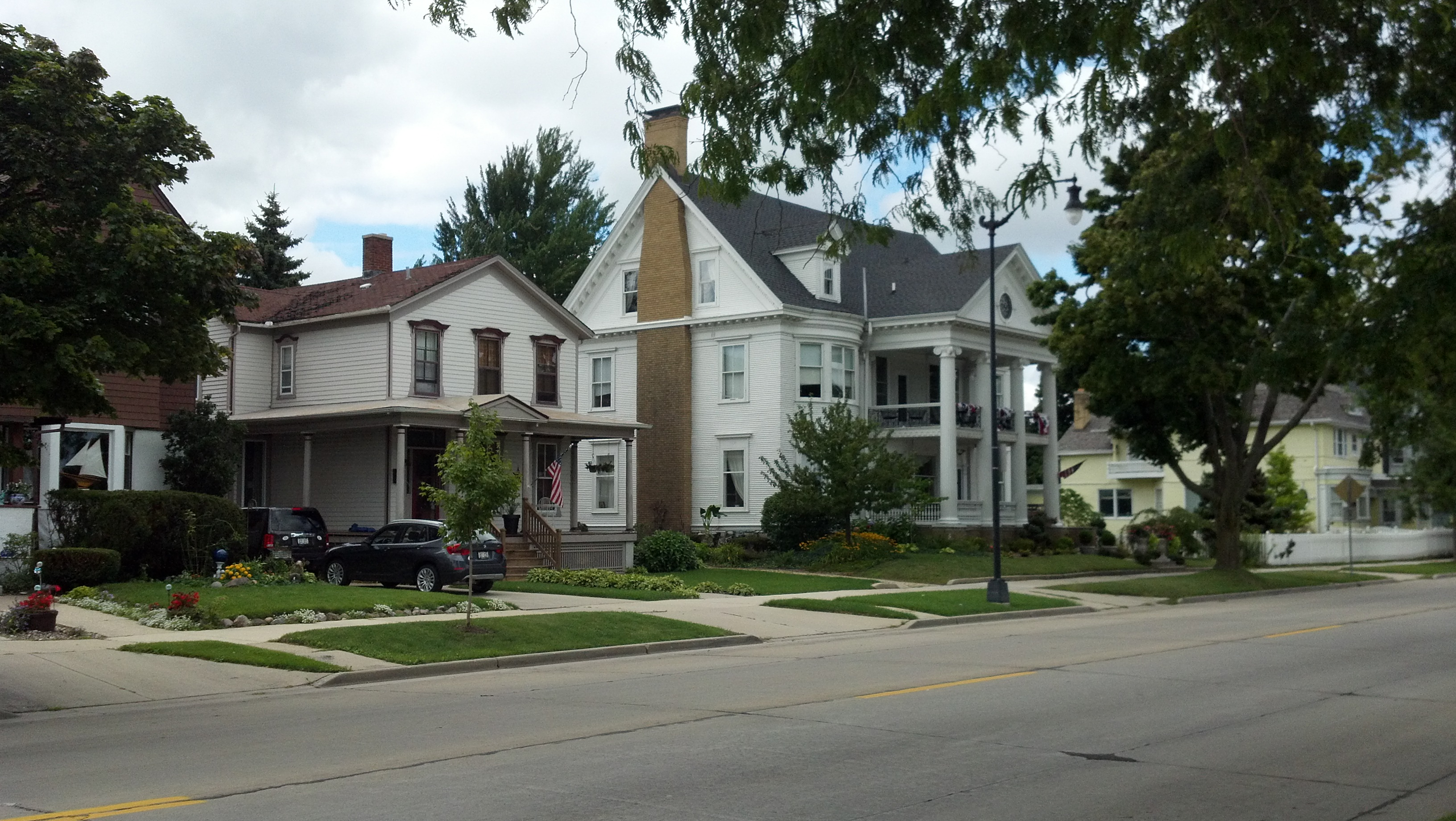
- Location: Racine, Wisconsin 43°3′10.1″N 87°53′59.3″W
- NRHP reference No.: 77000147
- Added to NRHP: October 18, 1977

The Southside Historic District is a large, prestigious historic neighborhood in Racine, Wisconsin, including over 500 contributing structures in various architectural styles. It was added to the National Register of Historic Places in 1977.

== Select buildings ==
Contributing buildings in the district were built from 1842 to 1924. Here is a selection roughly in the order built:

- The William and Eliza Hunt house at 1247 S. Main Street is a Greek Revival-styled house with a portico supported by four Ionic columns. Hunt had it built in the 1840s at the corner of Ninth and Main Streets. Henry Mitchell later had it moved to Ninth and Lake. Mrs. J.W. Knight had it moved in 1912 to its present location.
- The Wallis house at 820 S. Main Street was begun around 1849 by Isaac Taylor, a lumber merchant. Its style is Greek Revival. Alexander McClurg, president of the City Bank of Racine and railroad entrepreneur, bought it in 1854. Jerome I. Case bought the house in 1887 to give to his daughter and her husband Henry M. Wallis, who eventually became president of the Case Plow Works. The Wallises probably remodeled the house in 1895. It later housed a VFW clubhouse.

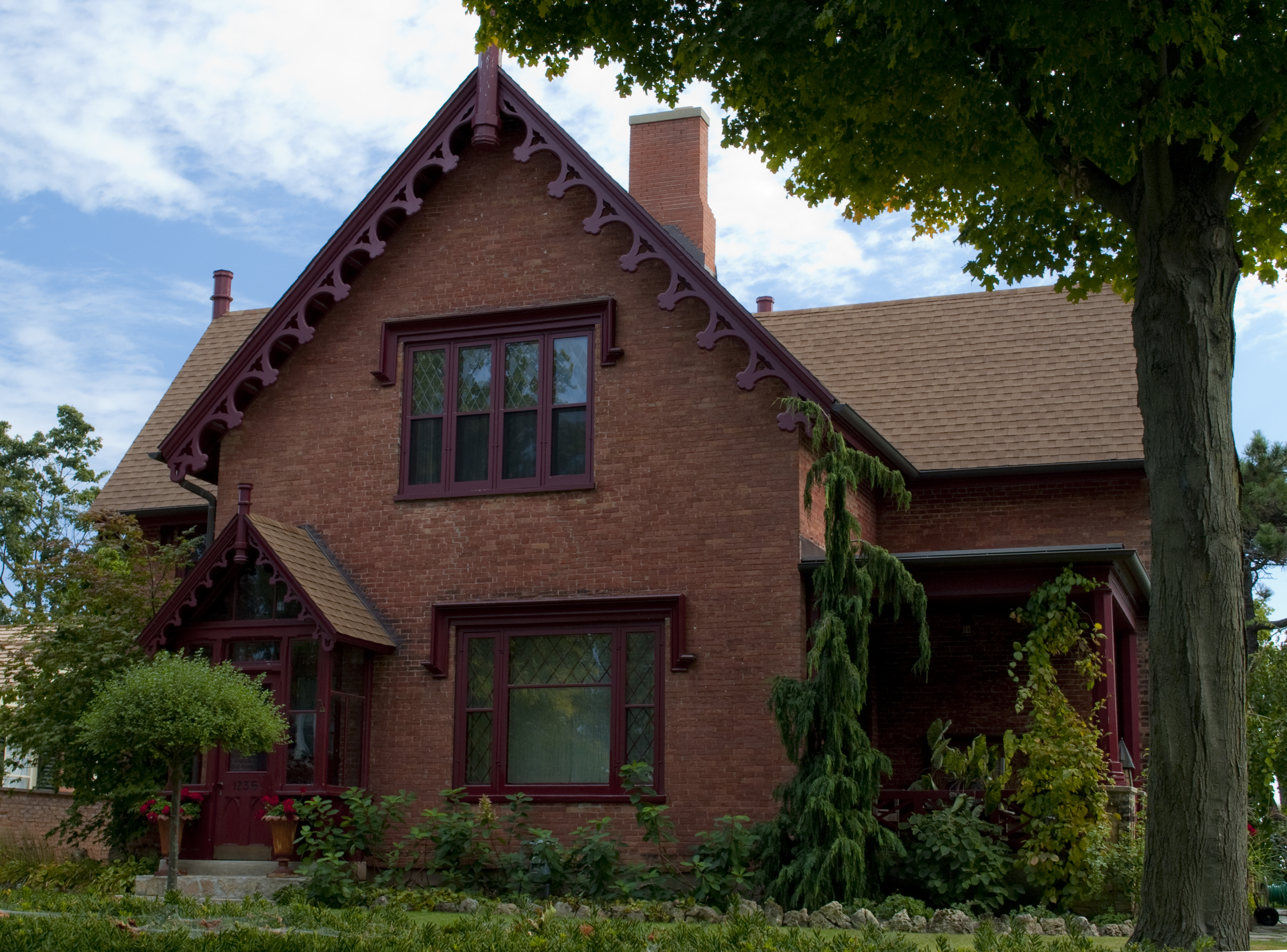
Chauncey Hall house

- The Chauncey Hall House at 1235 S. Main Street, built in 1849, is one of the earliest surviving Gothic Revival houses in Wisconsin. It was built from bricks traded for suits that tailor Chauncey had made.

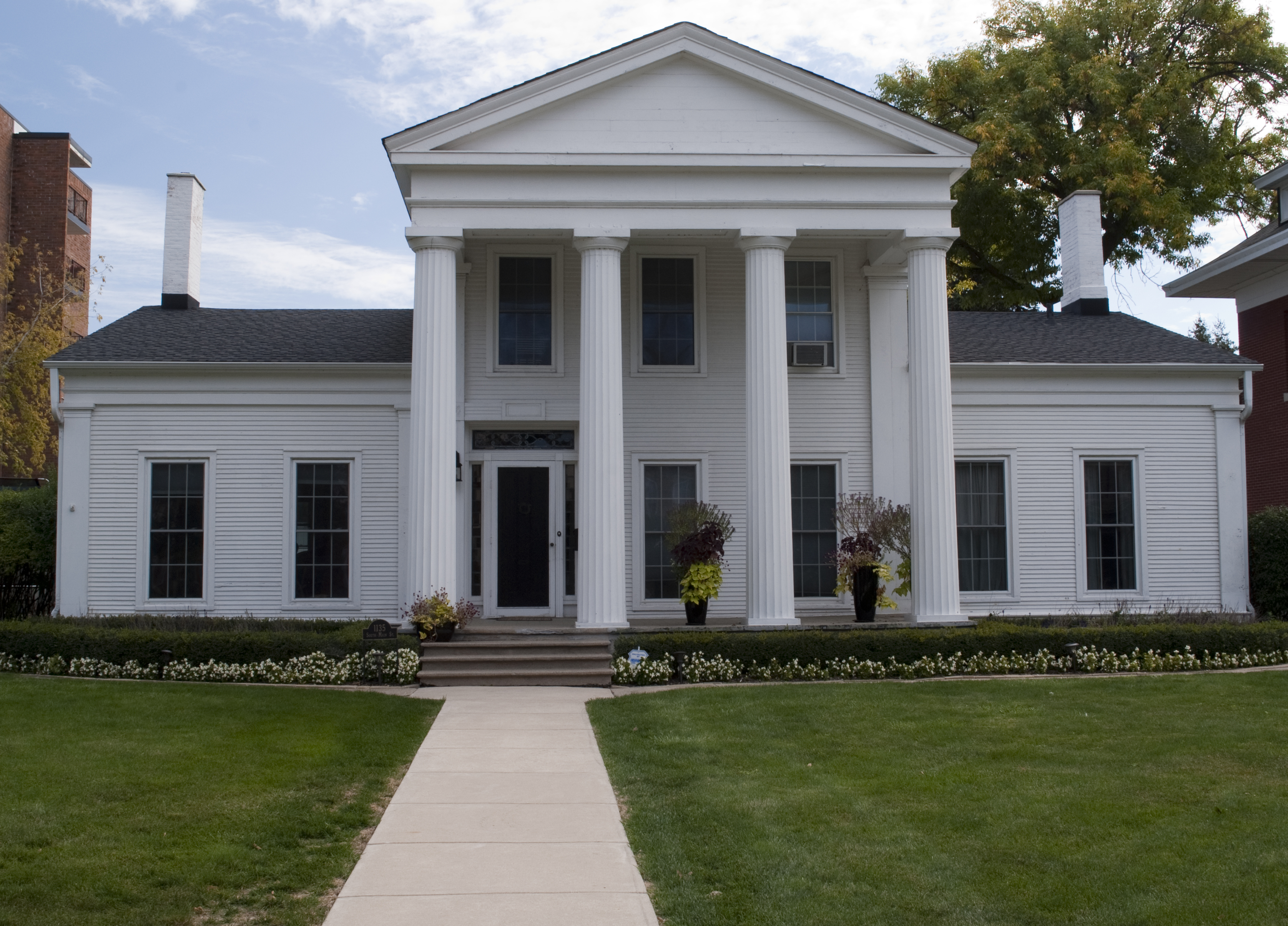
Eli Cooley house

- The Eli R. Cooley House at 1135 S. Main Street is a Greek Revival house designed by Lucas Bradley and built 1851-54, like a Greek temple with wings.
- The Henry S. Durand house at 1012 S. Main Street was built in 1856, a 2-story cream brick Italianate villa. Durand was involved in banking, insurance, lumbering, railroads, and city planning. In 1920 a Masonic Order bought the house and added an Egyptian-style temple behind the house, designed by member Edmund Funston with cobras, lotus and papyrus motifs.
- The Elmendorf house at 1844 S. Wisconsin Avenue is a 2-story cream brick Italianate-styled home designed by Fredrick Graham and probably built about 1860 for Rev. John Elmendorf, a professor of "intellectual philosophy" and English literature at Racine College. In 1891 it was bought by Henry and Emilie Hurlburt, whose company made wagon hardware.
- The Daniel Olin house at 1144 S. Main Street is an Italianate house designed by Lucas Bradley and built in 1868, two stories with a cupola. The house was built for Thomas Jones, a lumber man. It was later occupied by Daniel Olin, a railroad executive and mayor of Racine.
- First Baptist Church at 801 Wisconsin Avenue is a Gothic Revival-styled church built in 1876 with an angled square corner tower and a rose window.
- The house at 914 S. Wisconsin Avenue is Stick style, 2.5 stories, built in 1878. It is early for Stick style in Wisconsin.
- The George Q. Erskine house at 920 S. Main Street is a High Victorian Italianate brick home designed by David R. Jones and built in the early 1880s, with a four-story tower. Erskine was a banker, politician, and vice-president of J.I. Case Plow Works.
- The Margaret Shurr cottage at 1436 College Avenue is a modest, intact Queen Anne-style house built in 1889 with a lattice-work bargeboard and a delicate veranda.
- The Julian Sims house at 803 S. Main Street was built before 1890 for Dr. Julian Sims. In 1901 Dr. Clarendon I. Shoop, seller of patent medicines, bought the house and enlarged it. The style is now Neoclassical Revival, with a colossal Greek-temple-like portico with Ionic columns and a shield-shaped window in the pediment. A funeral home later occupied the house.
- The Theresa and Joseph Miller house at 1100 Main Street is a 3-story Queen Anne mansion built in 1893 with cream brick walls, four round-arched windows in the front gable, and a round corner tower topped with a conical French-style roof. Joseph had immigrated from Prussia in 1847 and founded the J. Miller Shoe Company which made boots for Wisconsin soldiers during the Civil War. He served as president of the Racine Knitting Co., Turner Stove Co., Belle City Railway Co., the Racine Nail and Tack Co., and as mayor of Racine. George and Maume Wheary of the Wheary Trunk Co. lived in the house from the 1920s to 1940s.
- The Lily and Henry G. Mitchell House at 905 S. Main Street is a Dutch Colonial Revival home designed by Cecil Corwin and built in 1894 with a stone veneer unusual for the style. Behind it is a stable house that echoes the gambrel-roof design. Henry was vice-president of the Mitchell-Lewis Motor Company.
- The Frank house at 1520 College Avenue is a 2.5-story Queen Anne house built in 1895, with corner towers and various bays and dormers. August Frank was a partner with his father-in-law in a leather business, but was also a lecturer and explorer who brought a mummy back from Egypt. Arthur Meyer's tea room occupied the house in the 1940s and Green Bay Packer Don Hutson lived there in the 1950s.
- The Charles and Imogene Carpenter house at 1324 S. Main Street is a 2-story Georgian Revival home built in 1896 with a 2-story portico supported by four Ionic columns and a wrought-iron balcony. Charles was a cashier at the Commercial Savings Bank.
- The Henry C. Miller house at 1110 Main Street is a 2.5-story Georgian Revival-styled house designed by Crane and Barkhausen of Milwaukee with a giant portico with two Ionic columns supporting a pediment with an elaborate carving. Henry built the house in 1898 in preparation for his marriage to his wife Cosie, and near the house of his father Joseph, at whose shoe factory Henry was a superintendent.
- The Samuel Curtis Johnson house at 1737 Wisconsin Avenue is a Picturesque Gothic cottage with steep roofs and bargeboards designed by the founder of S. C. Johnson & Son and built in 1903. Johnson designed the brick cottage himself and laid the parquet floors himself. Johnson's ornamental floor business evolved into floor wax and household products.

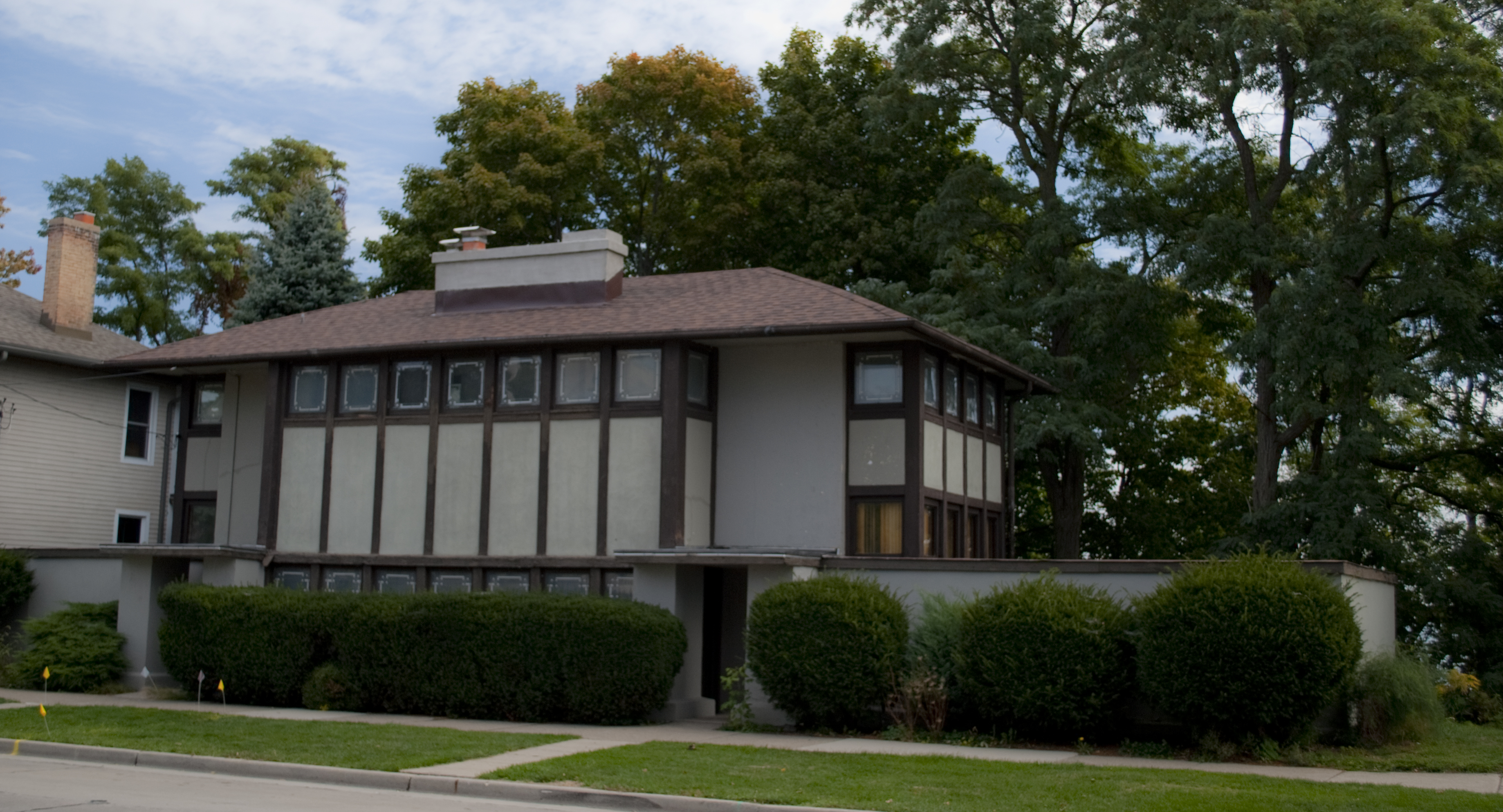
Thomas P. Hardy house

- The Thomas P. Hardy House at 1319 S. Main Street is a Prairie School-style house designed by Frank Lloyd Wright and built in 1905 down the side of a bluff above Lake Michigan.
