= J. Mandor Matson =

American architect

Justave Mandor Matson (August 11, 1890 – May 23, 1963) was an architect in Racine, Wisconsin. He designed the United Laymen Bible Student Tabernacle in Racine County, Wisconsin and Wilmanor Apartments in Racine County (both listed on the National Register of Historic Places). Matson assisted Pennsylvania firm Richter & Eiler in the design of the Holy Communion Lutheran Church (Racine, Wisconsin) (1928) at 2000 W. Sixth. He also designed Racine City Hall, Horlick High School and Park High School (Racine, Wisconsin), as well as Mitchell Elementary and middle school. Frank Lloyd Wright replaced Matson in 1935 as the architect for S.C. Johnson's administration building. Matson is also credited with designing the Granada Theatre (Racine, Wisconsin) at 1924 Charles Street in Racine. Matson is also credited with designing St. Edwards Church in Racine and Roosevelt School in Racine and Fire Station No. 4 (1941) in La Crosse.

== See also ==
- National Register of Historic Places listings in Racine County, Wisconsin
