= George Bray Neighborhood Center =

Historic church in Wisconsin, United States

- United Laymen Bible Student Tabernacle
- U.S. National Register of Historic Places
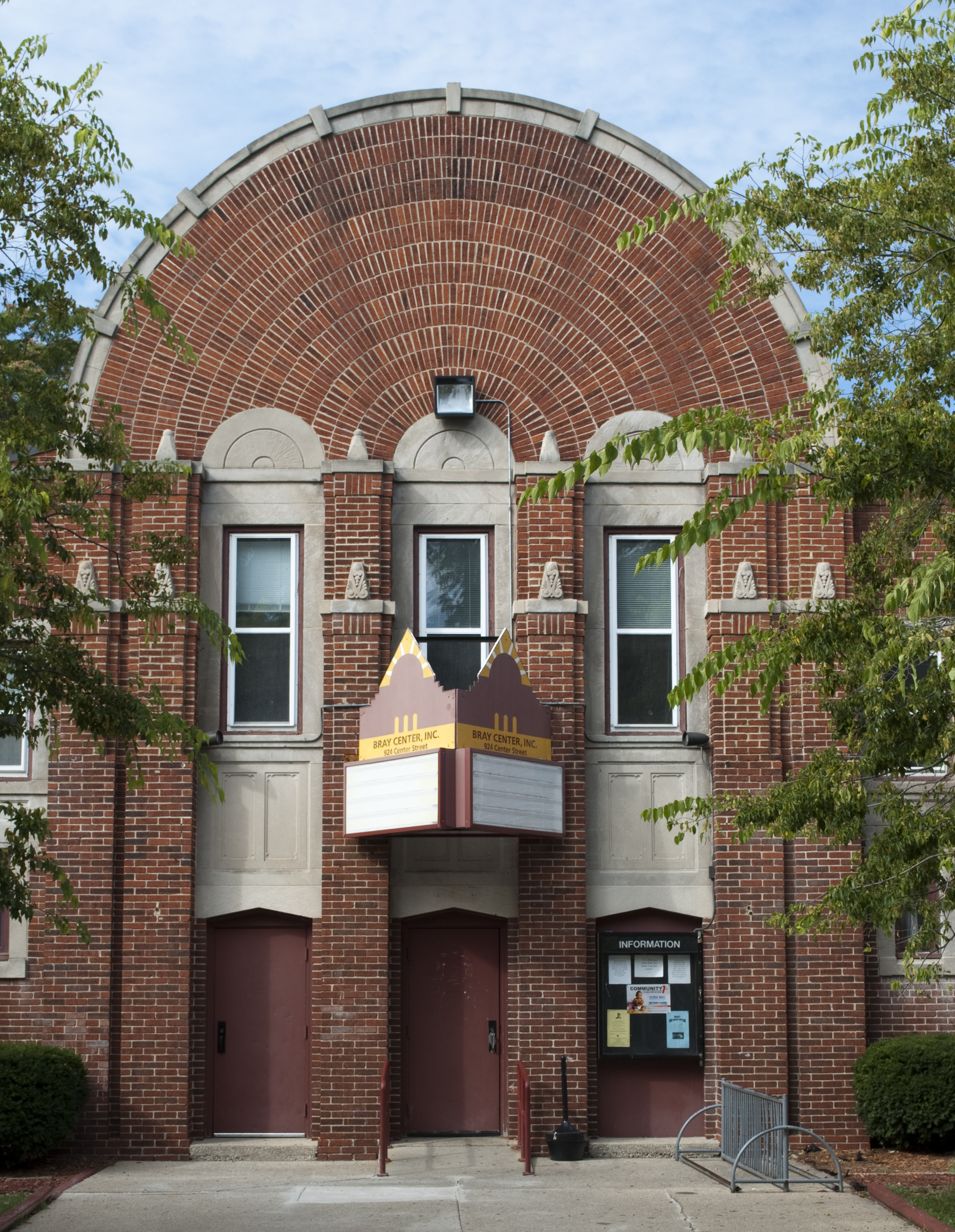
- United Laymen Bible Student Tabernacle
- Location: 924 Center St. Racine, Wisconsin
- Coordinates: 42.72213°N 87.78971°W
- Built: 1927
- Architect: J. Mandor Matson
- NRHP reference No.: 83004318
- Added to NRHP: December 8, 1983

The George Bray Neighborhood Center, formerly the United Laymen Bible Student Tabernacle or Union Tabernacle, is located at 924 Center Street in the School Section neighborhood of Racine, Wisconsin. It was built in 1927, designed by architect J. Mandor Matson, and added to the National Register of Historic Places in 1983.

Starting in 1924, members of various evangelical churches in Racine joined for inter-church Bible studies. They called themselves the Racine Laymen's Bible Union, and they took turns meeting in different churches. In 1925 they bought a lot for their own building. They hired an architect, and on May 15, 1927, the new building was "dedicated to the promotion of... Bible teaching and Gospel preaching, with earnest advocacy and generous support of the world-wide mission."

The building is a red brick auditorium with a 2-story brick facade. The facade is trimmed with two ranks of pilasters topped with finials. Above them all is a large tympanum, an arch filled with concentric arches of brick. It was designed by J. Mandor Matson, a Norwegian immigrant who practiced in Racine. The style is classed as Art Deco, but the United Laymen probably saw the Trinity in the three circles within the large circle, and they probably saw candles in the pilasters topped with finials, perhaps representing their mission to be a light to the world.

The Racine Bible Church occupied the building until 1961 or 1962. It housed the local Boy Scouts from 1965 to 1969. The Franklin Neighborhood Association, a community center organization, moved into the building in 1969. The community center was named for George Bray, then-retiring head of the center, city alderman, and founder of the Racine NAACP chapter, in 1980. The center lost state funding in 2015, and a lack of funds forced it to close in September 2016. It reopened on February 23, 2017, as a branch of the Racine Family YMCA, in a ceremony that featured Racine native and NBA player Caron Butler.
