= Chauncey Hall Building =

Historic building in Racine, Wisconsin, US

- U.S. National Register of Historic Places
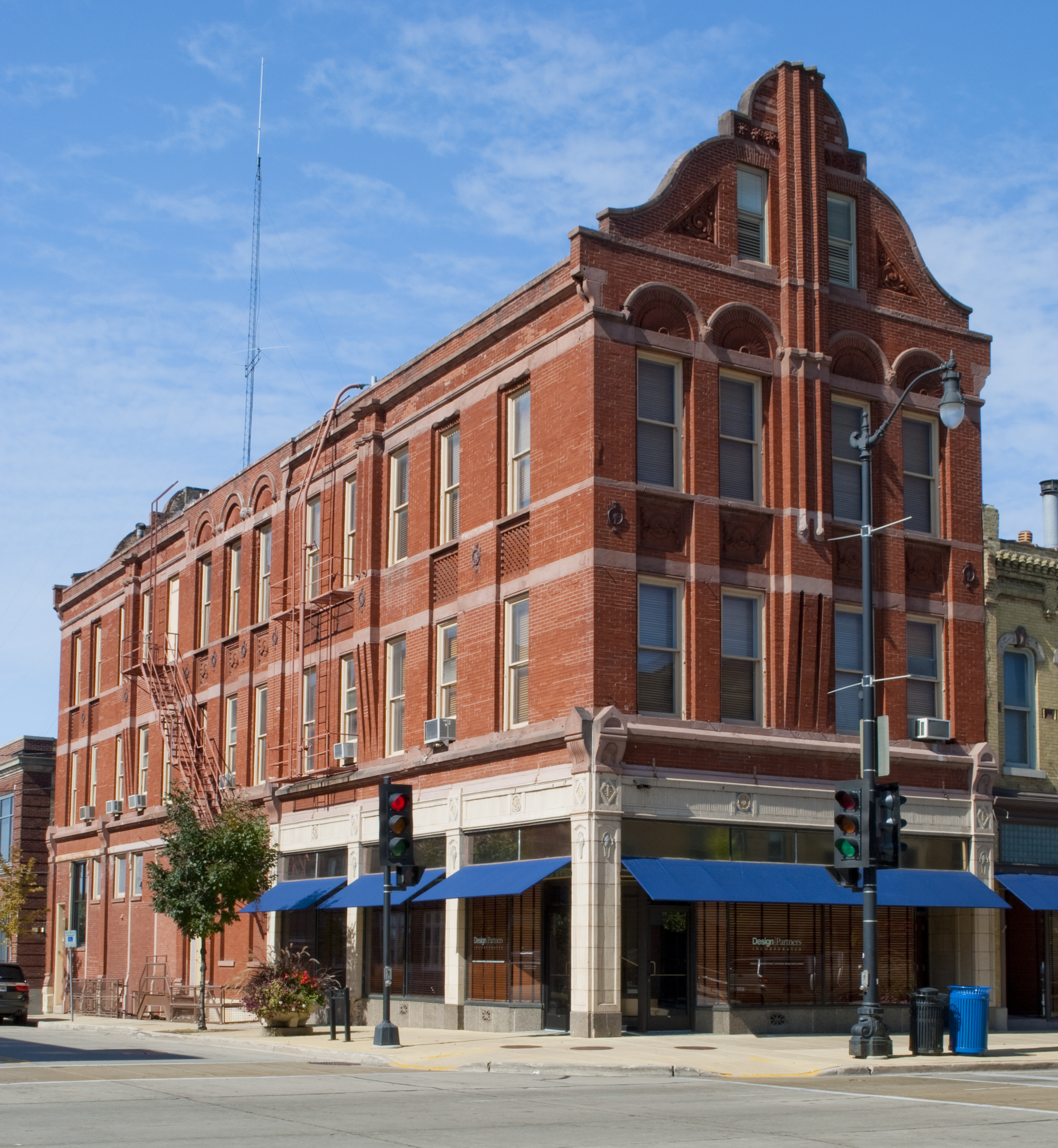
- Chauncey Hall Building

- Location within Wisconsin Location within the United States
- Location: 338-340 Main St. Racine, Wisconsin
- Coordinates: 42°43′46″N 87°47′0″W
- Area: 0.1 acres (0.040 ha)
- Built: 1883
- Architect: E. Townsend Mix
- Architectural style: Queen Anne
- NRHP reference No.: 80000175
- Added to NRHP: October 10, 1980

The Chauncey Hall Building is a building located in Racine, Wisconsin. It was added to the National Register of Historic Places in 1980. It is located within the Historic Sixth Street Business District.

It is a three-story commercial building 30 by 90 feet (9.1 m × 27.4 m) in plan, with its long axis along Fourth Street. It was designed by E. Townsend Mix, architect of Milwaukee, for banker Chauncey Hall.

== See also ==
- National Register of Historic Places in Racine County, Wisconsin
- Chauncey Hall House, also NRHP-listed in Racine
