= Hansen House (Racine, Wisconsin) =

Historic house in Wisconsin, United States

- U.S. National Register of Historic Places
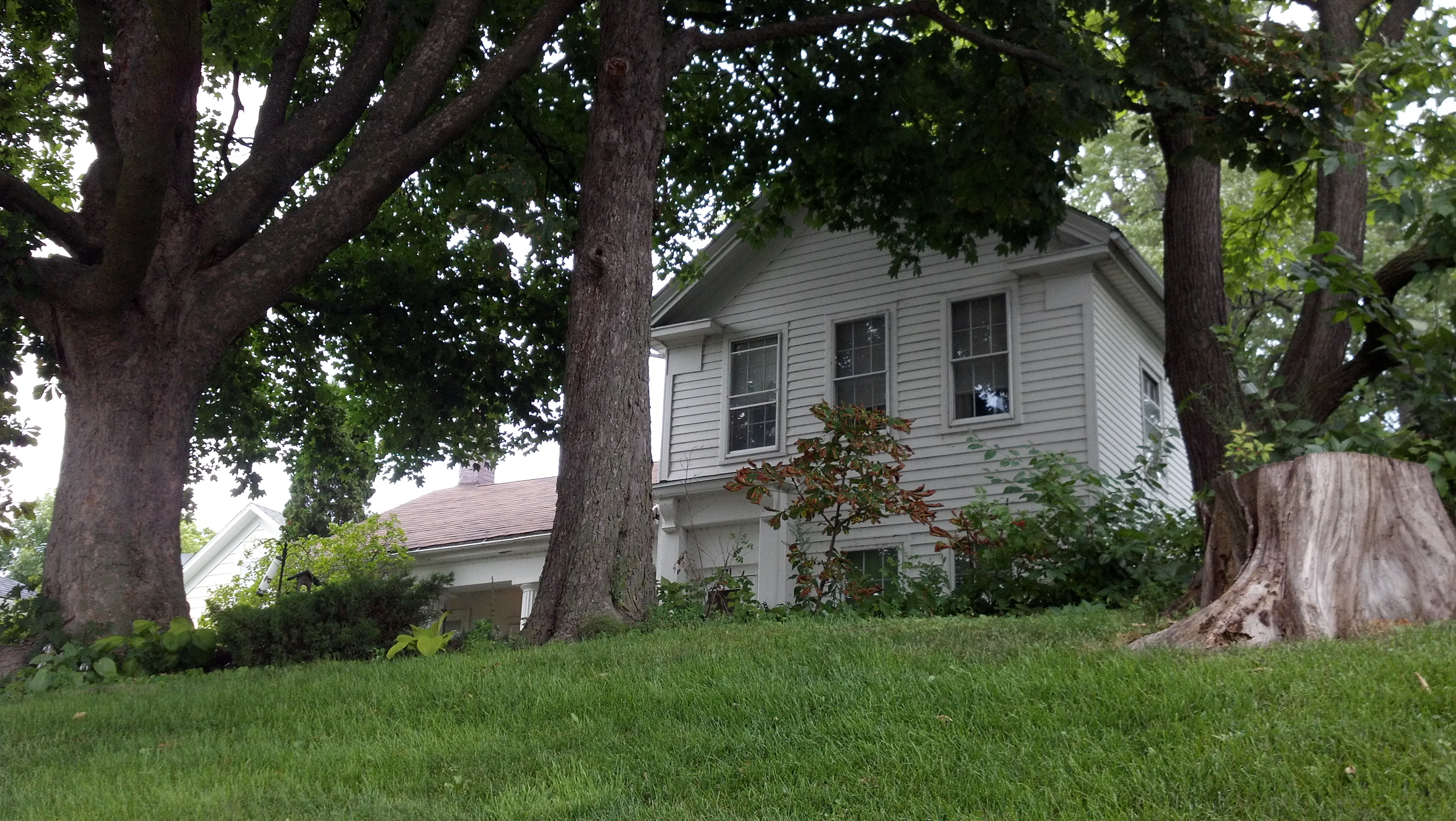

- Location within Wisconsin Location within the United States
- Location: 1221 N. Main St., Racine, Wisconsin
- Coordinates: 42°44′10″N 87°47′4″W
- Area: 0.3 acres (0.12 ha)
- Built: c.1855
- Built by: Fuller, Thomas
- Architectural style: Greek Revival
- NRHP reference No.: 79000103
- Added to NRHP: June 6, 1979

The Hansen House in Racine, Wisconsin is a Greek Revival style house probably built between 1854 and 1856 by carpenter Thomas Fuller. It was listed on the National Register of Historic Places listings in 1979.

It was deemed "the best example in Racine of a significant common type of Greek Revival house — the two-story pavilion with gable end facing the street and a onestory wing with porch. This type was popular in western New York State and throughout the Midwest."
