= Chauncey Hall House =

Historic house in Wisconsin, United States

- U.S. National Register of Historic Places
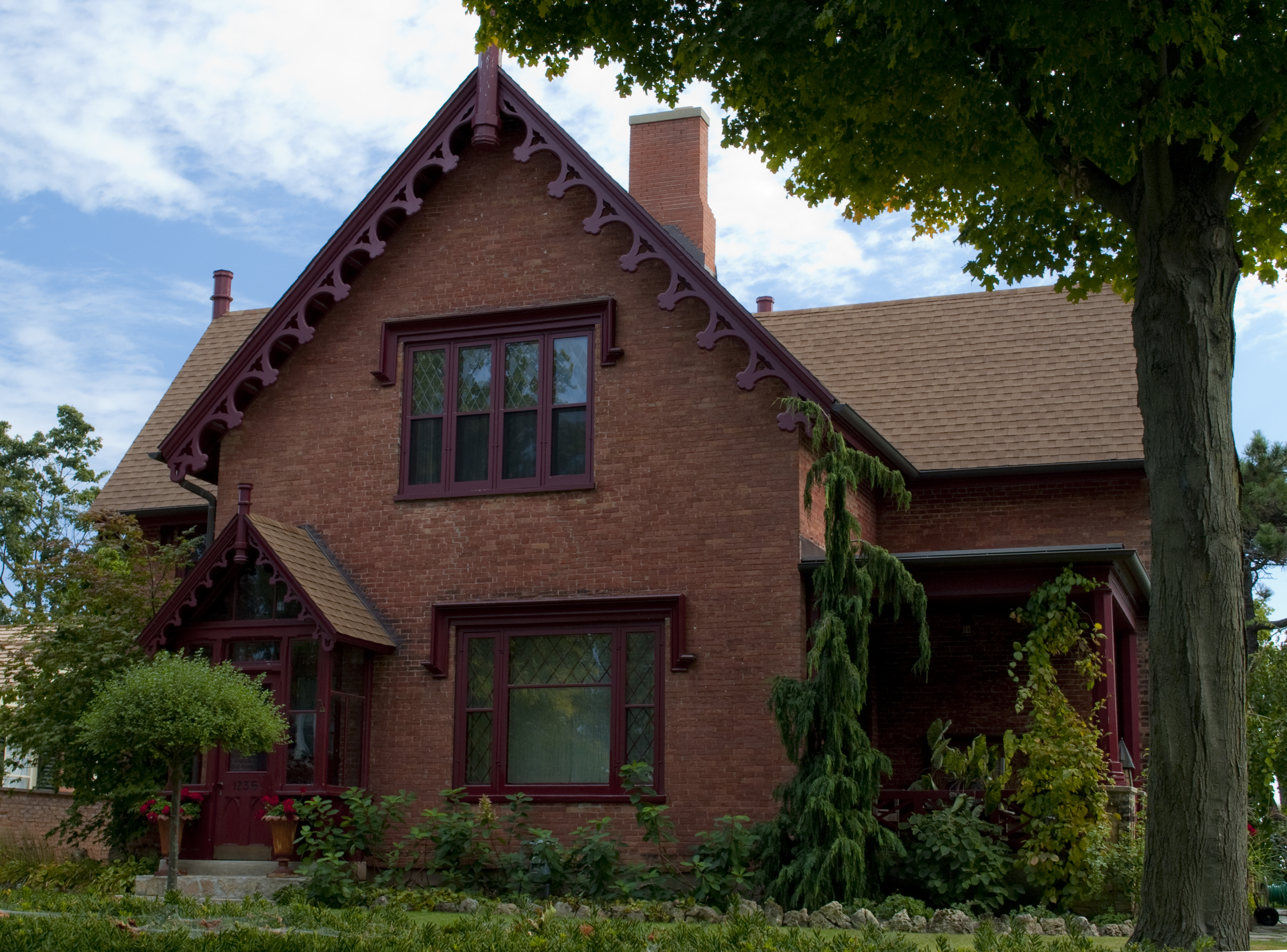
- Chauncey Hall House

- Location within Wisconsin Location within the United States
- Location: 1235 S. Main St. Racine, Wisconsin
- Coordinates: 42°43′4″N 87°46′55″W
- Area: less than one acre
- Architect: Andrew Jackson Downing
- Architectural style: Gothic Revival
- NRHP reference No.: 76000075
- Added to NRHP: January 2, 1976

The Chauncey Hall House, also known as Knight House, is located in Racine, Wisconsin, United States. It was added to the National Register of Historic Places in 1976.

Designed by architect Andrew Jackson Downing, it is a two-story red brick house, built before 1854, perhaps as early as 1842, and is the oldest Gothic Revival-style house in Racine.

It remains privately owned.

== See also ==
- Chauncey Hall Building, also NRHP-listed in Racine
