= Thomas P. Hardy House =

Historic house in Wisconsin, United States

- U.S. National Register of Historic Places
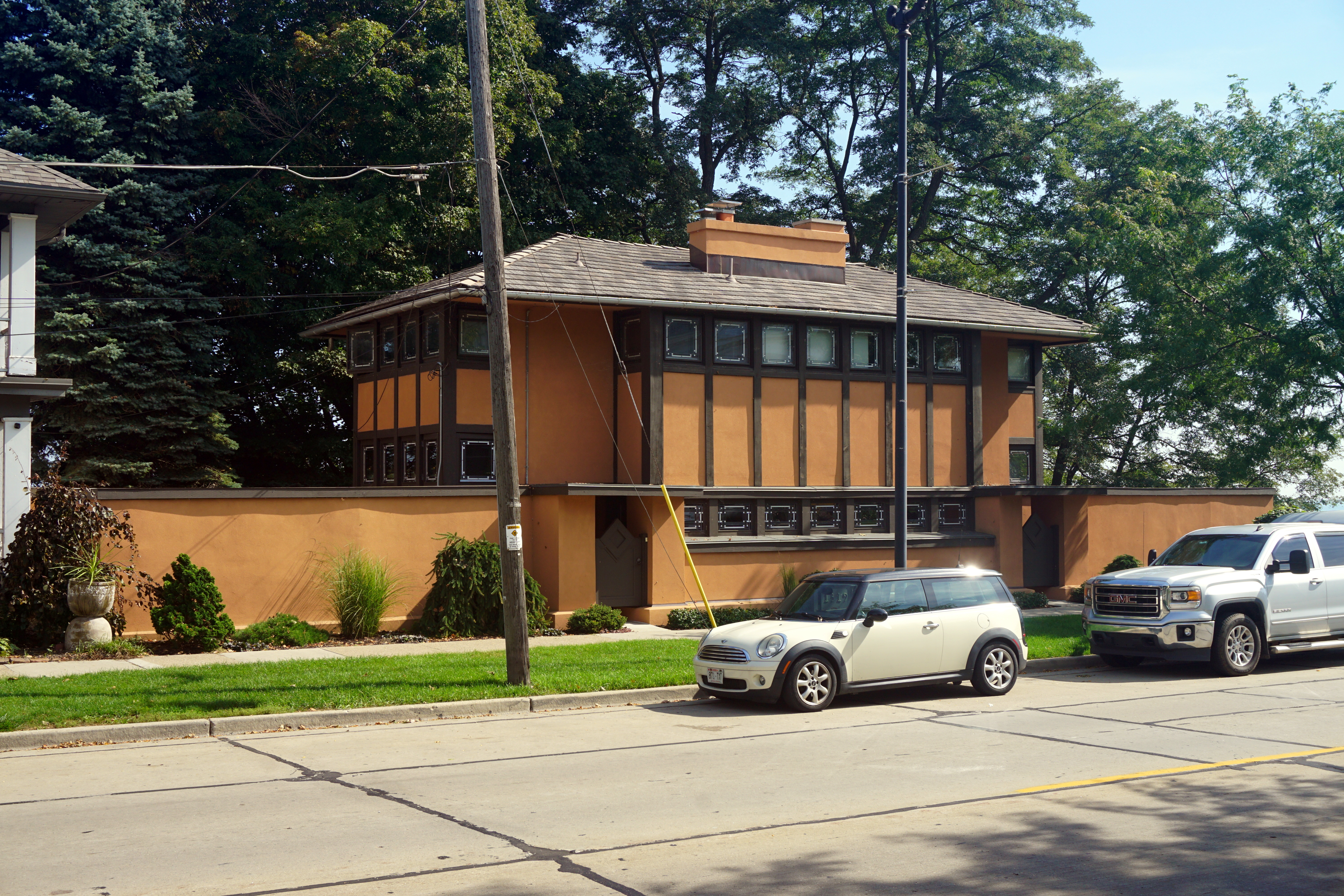

- Location within Wisconsin Location within the United States
- Location: 1319 S. Main St., Racine, Wisconsin
- Coordinates: 42°42′59″N 87°46′55″W
- Area: less than one acre
- Built: 1905
- Architect: Frank Lloyd Wright
- Architectural style: Prairie School
- NRHP reference No.: 74000120
- Added to NRHP: December 3, 1974

The Thomas P. Hardy House is a Frank Lloyd Wright-designed Prairie School home in Racine, Wisconsin, United States, that was built in 1905. The street-facing side of the house is mostly stucco, giving the residents privacy from the nearby sidewalk and street, but the expansive windows on the other side open up to Lake Michigan.

== Description and history ==
Perched on a bluff overlooking Lake Michigan, the house is built vertically up and down the hillside, and has a partial basement. The design of the seven art glass windows on the first floor facing the street is an abstraction of the floorplan of the house itself. Most of the windows are either on the top level, or on the lake side. Not visible from the street side are the terrace, one story below street level, and the two-story living room which, with its upper-story balcony, opens the entire living quarters to the lake view.

From 2013 to 2015, a renovation was completed on the home, including a color change back to its original terra cotta.

This house demonstrates Wright's ability to fit a design to a site. Most of the homes on this street are quite close to the sidewalk, since the hill drops away from the street and towards the lake very quickly, but Wright's entryway for the Hardy house is literally at the line of the sidewalk.

== Reception ==
The house has been considered one of Wright's classics. Henry Russell Hitchcock writes "Other dramatic possibilities of steep sites above water for these winged… houses are to be found in the Johnson house at Delavan Lake [Wisconsin] and the Scudder project for one of the islands at the Sault.… But the masterpiece is the Hardy house of 1905 at Racine." Kenneth Frampton states "The Hardy House … is the purest formulation that Wright was ever to make of a symmetrical, frontalized house."

It remains a private residence.

== Floor plans ==
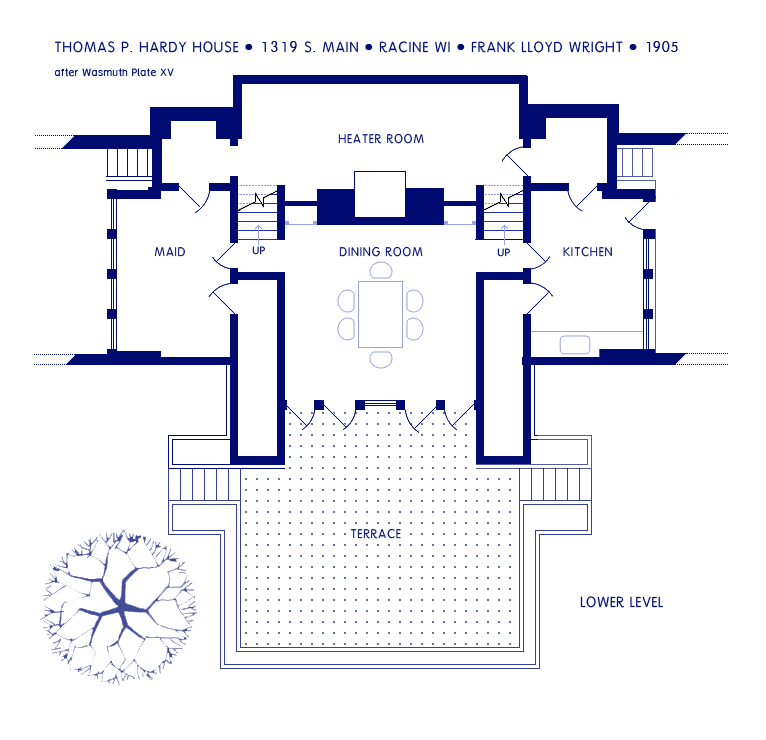
Lower level

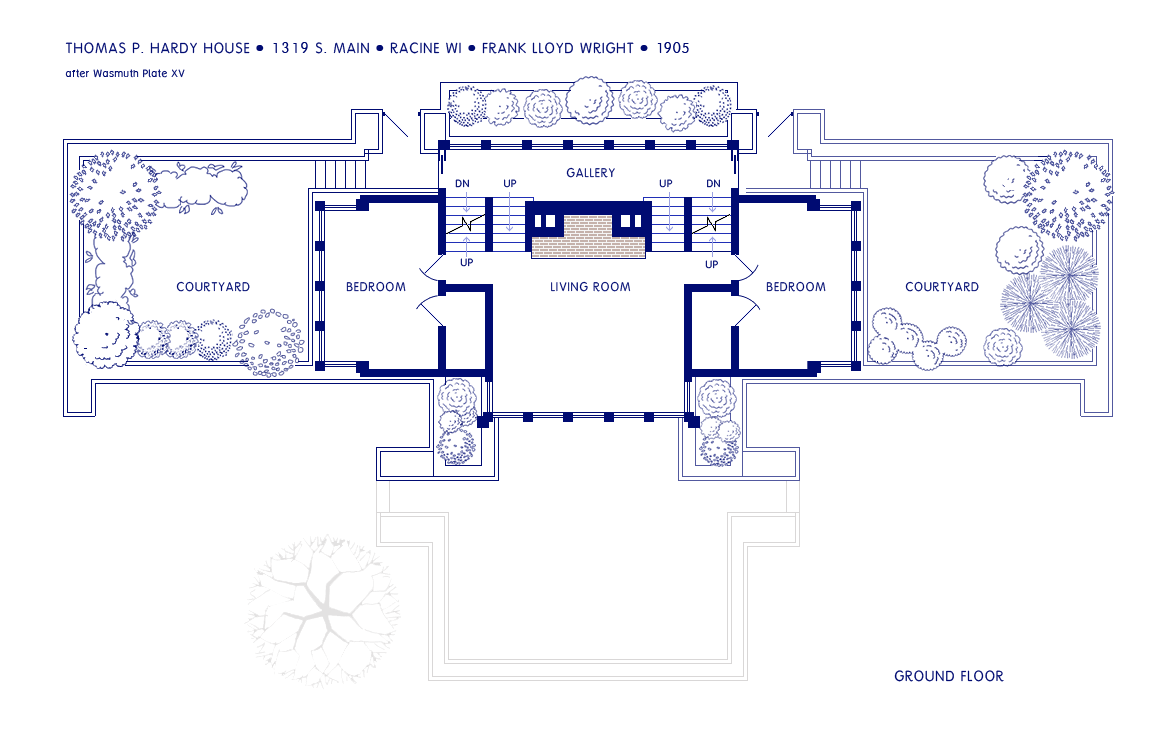
Ground floor

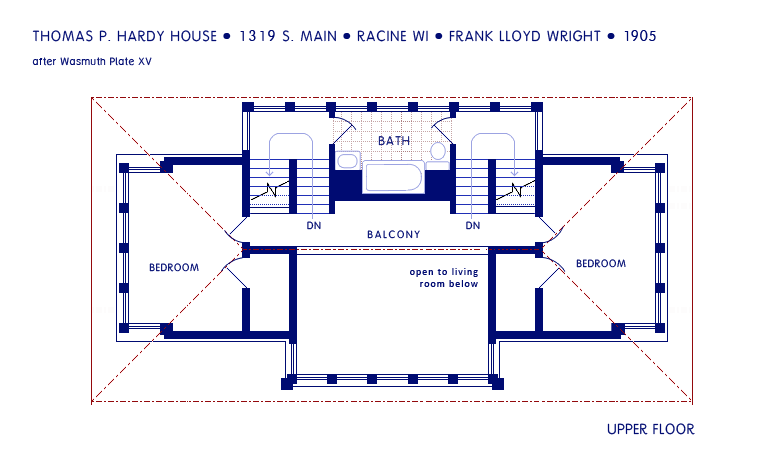
Upper floor

== See also ==
- National Register of Historic Places in Racine County, Wisconsin
- List of Frank Lloyd Wright works
