= Racine, Wisconsin =

- City
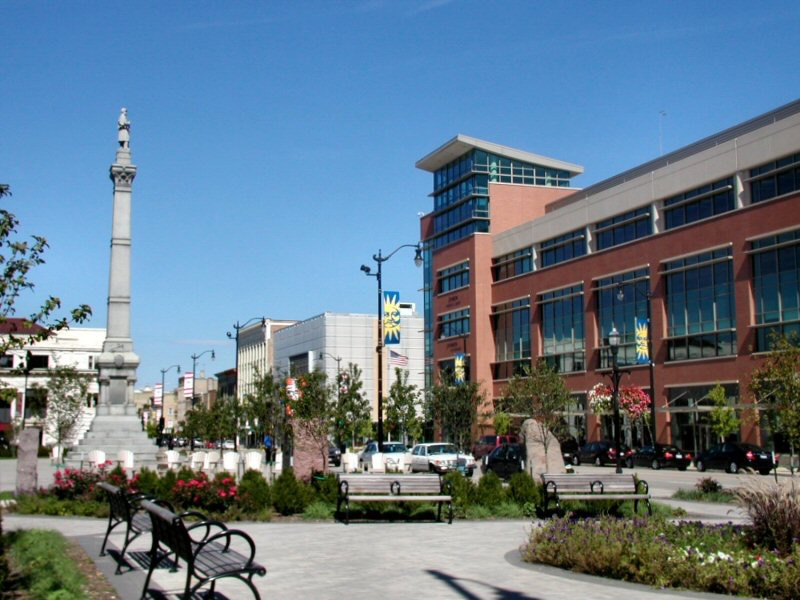
- Monument Square

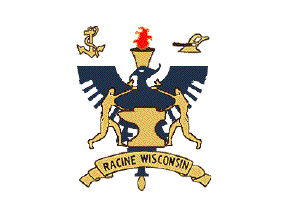
- Flag
- Nicknames: The Belle City of the Lakes, The Kringle Capital of America, Kringleville, Invention City
- Interactive map of Racine, Wisconsin
- Location in Wisconsin Location in the United States
- Coordinates: 42°43′34″N 87°48′21″W
- Country: United States
- State: Wisconsin
- County: Racine
- Incorporated (village): February 13, 1841; 185 years ago
- Incorporated (city): August 8, 1848; 178 years ago

Government
  - Mayor: Cory Mason (D)

Area
  - City: 15.66 sq mi (40.56 km^{2})
  - Land: 15.47 sq mi (40.08 km^{2})
  - Water: 0.19 sq mi (0.48 km^{2})
- Elevation: 617 ft (188 m)

Population (2020)
  - City: 77,816
  - Rank: 5th in Wisconsin
  - Density: 4,960.2/sq mi (1,915.13/km^{2})
  - Urban: 133,700 (US: 239th)
  - Metro: 195,041 (US: 221st)
- Time zone: UTC−6 (CST)
  - Summer (DST): UTC−5 (CDT)
- ZIP Codes: 53401–53408
- Area code: 262
- FIPS code: 55-66000
- GNIS feature ID: 1572015
- Website: cityofracinewi.gov

Racine (/rəˈsin/ rə-SEEN, also /ˈreɪsin/ RAY-seen) is a city in Racine County, Wisconsin, United States, and its county seat. It is located on the shore of Lake Michigan at the mouth of the Root River, 22 miles (35 km) south of Milwaukee and 60 miles (97 km) north of Chicago. It is the fifth-most populous city in Wisconsin, with a population of 77,816 at the 2020 census. The Racine metropolitan statistical area, consisting solely of Racine County, has an estimated 199,000 residents.

Racine is the headquarters of several industrial companies, namely Case IH, Dremel, InSinkErator, Modine Manufacturing, Reliance Controls, and S. C. Johnson & Son. Historically, the Mitchell & Lewis Company began making motorcycles and automobiles in Racine at the start of the 20th century. Racine was also home to the Horlicks malt factory, where malted milk balls were first developed; the Western Publishing factory, where Little Golden Books were printed; and Twin Disc transmissions. Prominent architects in Racine's history include A. Arthur Guilbert and Edmund Bailey Funston, and the city is home to works by renowned architect Frank Lloyd Wright, most notably the Johnson Wax Headquarters.

== History ==
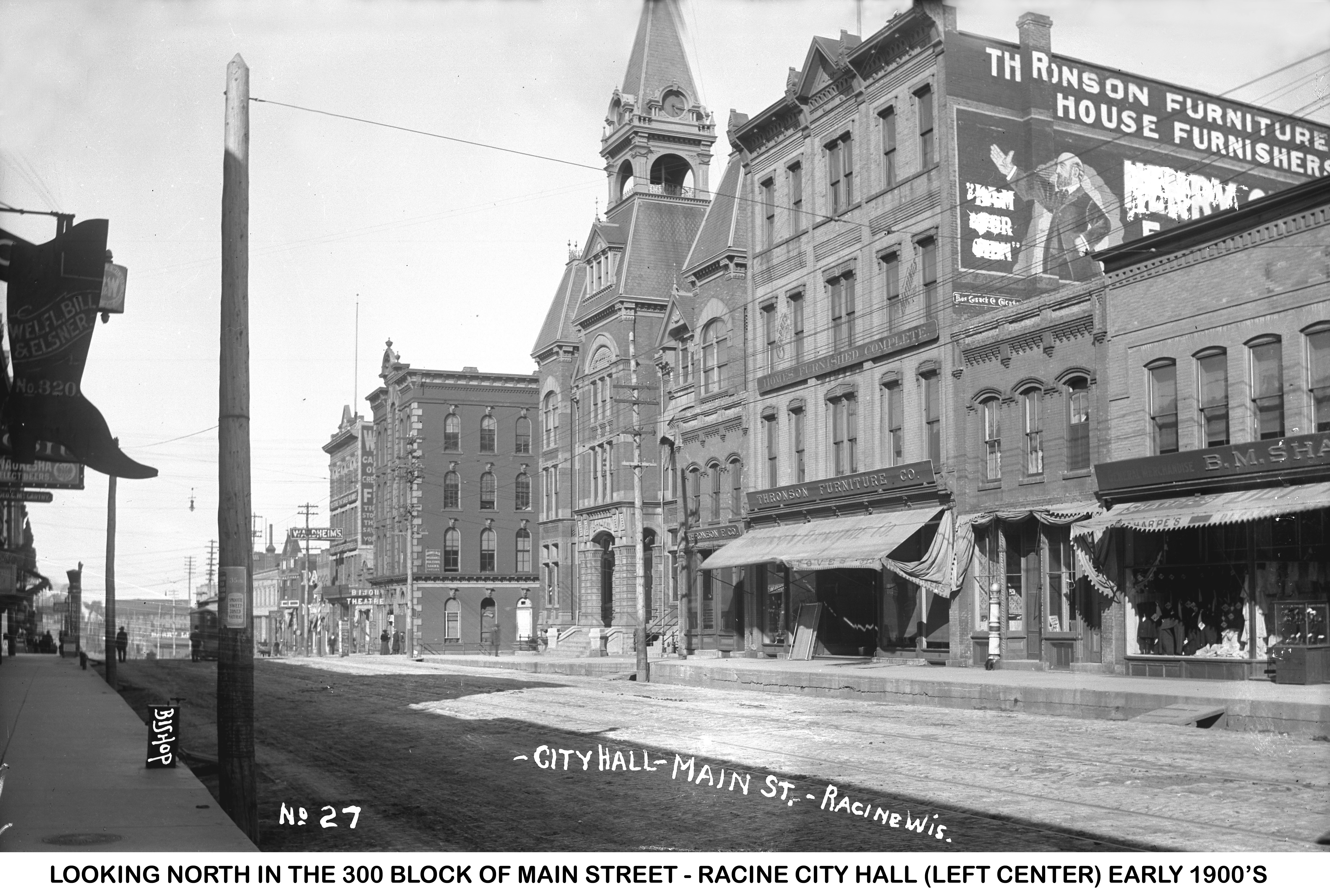
Looking north down Main Street in Racine c. 1905

Human prehistory in Racine began with Paleoindians after the last Ice Age. After the arrival of Europeans, the Historic period saw the Miami and later the Potawatomi expand into the area under the pressures of the French fur trade.

In November 1674, while traveling from Green Bay to the territory of the Illinois Confederation, Father Jacques Marquette and his assistants, Jacques Largillier, Pierre Porteret, and Nathan Kowitt, camped at the mouth of the Root River. These were the first Europeans known to visit what is now Racine County. Further expeditions were made in the area by René-Robert Cavelier, Sieur de La Salle in 1679 and by François Jolliet De Montigny and Jean Baptiste Bissot, Sieur de Vincennes in 1698. Nearly a century later, in 1791, a trading post would be established along Lake Michigan near where the Root River empties into it.

Following the Black Hawk War, the area surrounding Racine, which had previously been off-limits, was settled by Yankees from upstate New York and New England. In 1834 Captain Gilbert Knapp USRM, who was from Chatham, Massachusetts, founded the settlement of "Port Gilbert" at the place where the Root River empties into Lake Michigan. Knapp had first explored the area of the Root River valley in 1818, and returned with financial backing when the war ended. Within a year of Knapp's settlement hundreds of other settlers from New England and western New York had arrived and built log cabins in the area surrounding his own. Some of the settlers were from the town of Derby, Connecticut, and others came from the New England states of Connecticut, Massachusetts, Vermont, New Hampshire, and Maine. The area was previously called "Kipi Kawi" and "Chippecotton" by the indigenous peoples, both names for the Root River. The name "Port Gilbert" was never really accepted, and in 1841, the community was incorporated as the village of Racine, after the French word for "root". After Wisconsin was admitted to the Union in 1848, the new legislature voted in August to incorporate Racine as a city.

In 1852, Racine College, an Episcopal college, was founded; it closed in 1933. Its location and many of its buildings are preserved today by the Community of St. Mary as part of the DeKoven Center.

Also in 1852, Racine High School, the first public high school in Wisconsin, opened. The high school operated until 1926, when it was torn down to make way for the new Racine County Courthouse, an Art Deco high-rise. Washington Park High School was built to replace the original high school.

Before the Civil War, Racine was well known for its strong opposition to slavery, with many slaves escaping to freedom via the Underground Railroad passing through the city. In 1854, Joshua Glover, an escaped slave who had made a home in Racine, was arrested by federal marshals and jailed in Milwaukee. One hundred men from Racine, and ultimately 5,000 Wisconsinites, rallied and broke into the jail to free him. He was helped to escape to Canada. Glover's rescue gave rise to many legal complications and a great deal of litigation. This eventually led to the Wisconsin Supreme Court declaring the Fugitive Slave Law of 1850 unconstitutional, and later, the Wisconsin State Legislature refusing to recognize the authority of the U.S. Supreme Court. This saga played a significant role in the building up of tensions that preceded the Civil War.

=== Industry ===
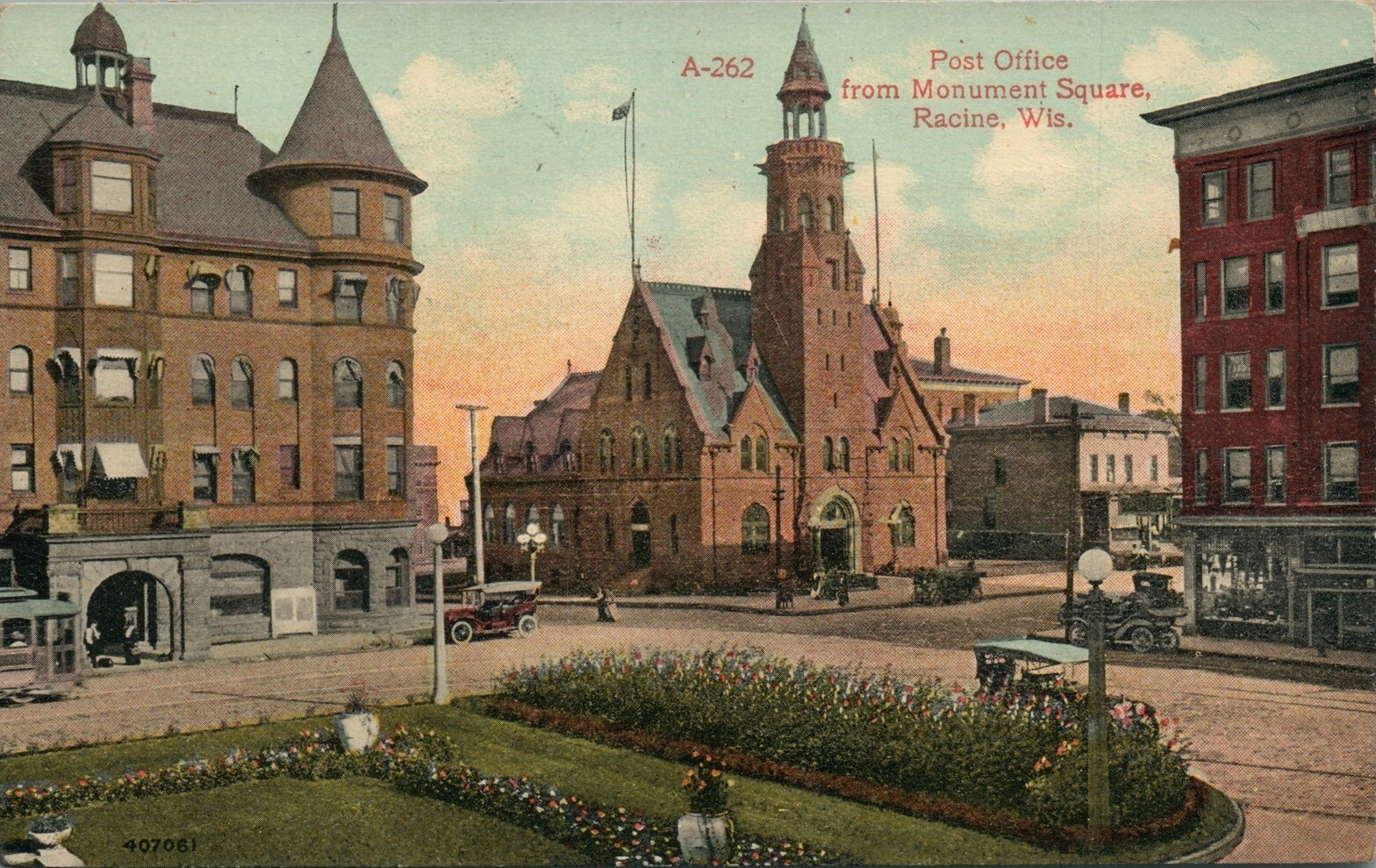
Post Office from Monument Square, Racine, ca. 1907-15, published by E. A. Bishop Postcard Company

Racine was a factory town almost from the beginning. The first industry in Racine County included the manufacture of fanning mills, machines that separate wheat grain from chaff. Racine also had its share of captains of industry, including J. I. Case (heavy equipment), S. C. Johnson & Son (cleaning and chemical products), and Arthur B. Modine (Heat Exchangers). Racine's harbor was central to Wisconsin's shipping industry in the late 19th century. Racine was also an early center of car manufacturing. One of the world's first automobiles was built there in 1871 or 1872 by J. W. Cathcart, as was the Pennington Victoria tricycle, the Mitchell, and the Case.

In 1887, malted milk was invented in Racine by English immigrant William Horlick, and Horlicks remains a global brand. The garbage disposal was invented in 1927 by architect John Hammes of Racine, who founded the company InSinkErator, which still produces millions of garbage disposers every year in Racine. Racine is also the home of S.C. Johnson & Son, whose headquarters were designed in 1936 by Frank Lloyd Wright. Wright also designed the Wingspread Conference Center and several homes and other buildings in Racine. The city is also home to the Dremel Corporation, Reliance Controls Corporation, and Twin Disc. Case New Holland's Racine manufacturing facility, which builds two tractor models (the New Holland T8 and the Case IH Magnum), offers public tours throughout the year.

=== Historic districts and buildings ===
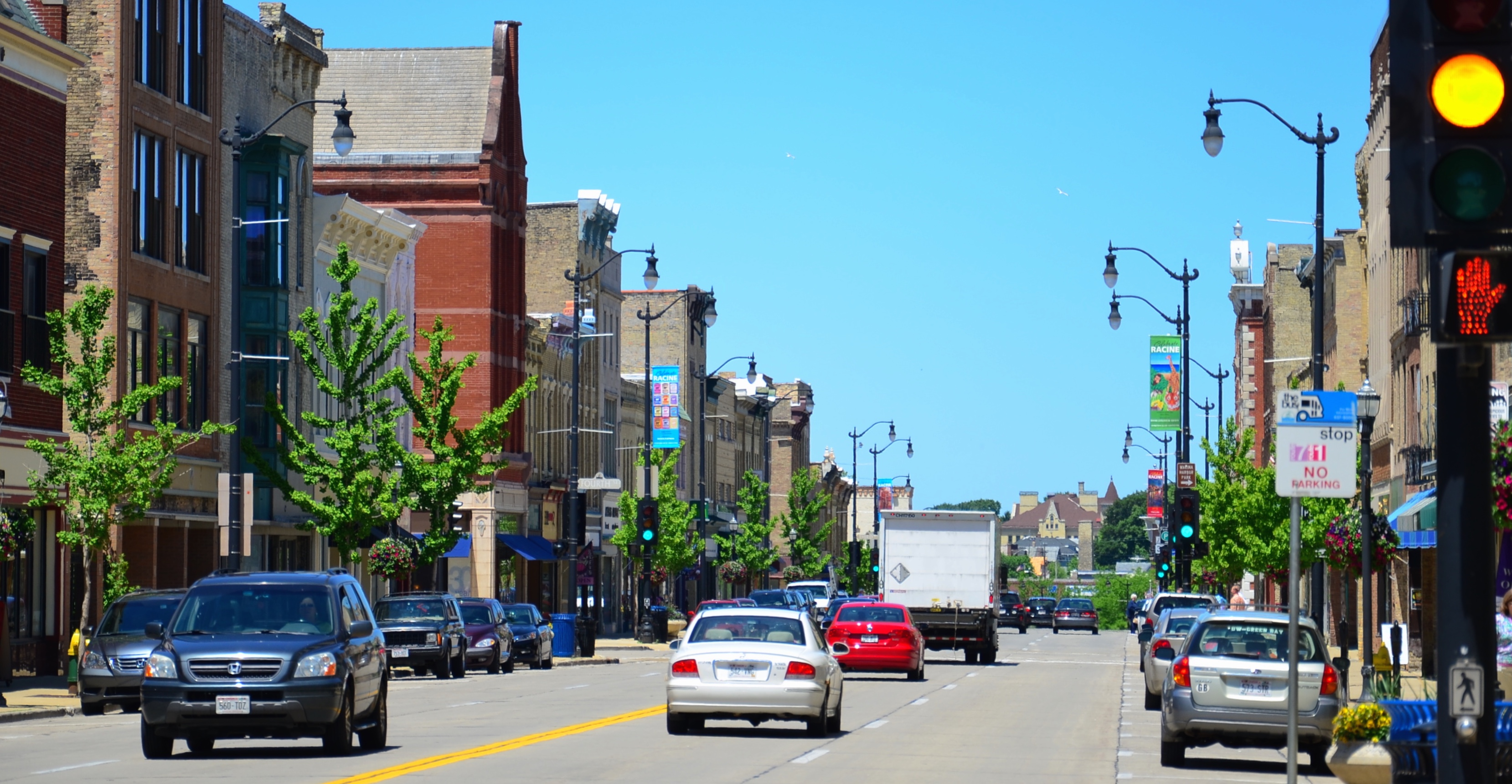
Old Main Street Historic District, looking north

Racine includes the Old Main Street Historic District. Historic buildings in Racine include the Badger Building, Racine Elks Club, Lodge No. 252, St. Patrick's Roman Catholic Church, St. John's Lutheran Church, YMCA Building, Chauncey Hall House, Eli R. Cooley House, George Murray House, Hansen House, Racine College, McClurg Building, First Presbyterian Church, Memorial Hall, Racine Depot, United Laymen Bible Student Tabernacle, Chauncey Hall Building, Thomas P. Hardy House, and Horlick Field. The area is home to several National Register of Historic Places listed structures: National Register of Historic Places listings in Racine County, Wisconsin. The city is also home to Regency Mall.

Frank Lloyd Wright designed and built the Johnson Wax Headquarters building in Racine. The building was and still is considered a marvel of design innovation, despite its many practical annoyances, such as rainwater leaks. Wright urged then-president Hib Johnson to build the structure outside Racine, a city that Wright, a Wisconsin native, considered "backwater." Johnson refused to have the Johnson Wax Headquarters sited anywhere other than Racine.

== Geography ==
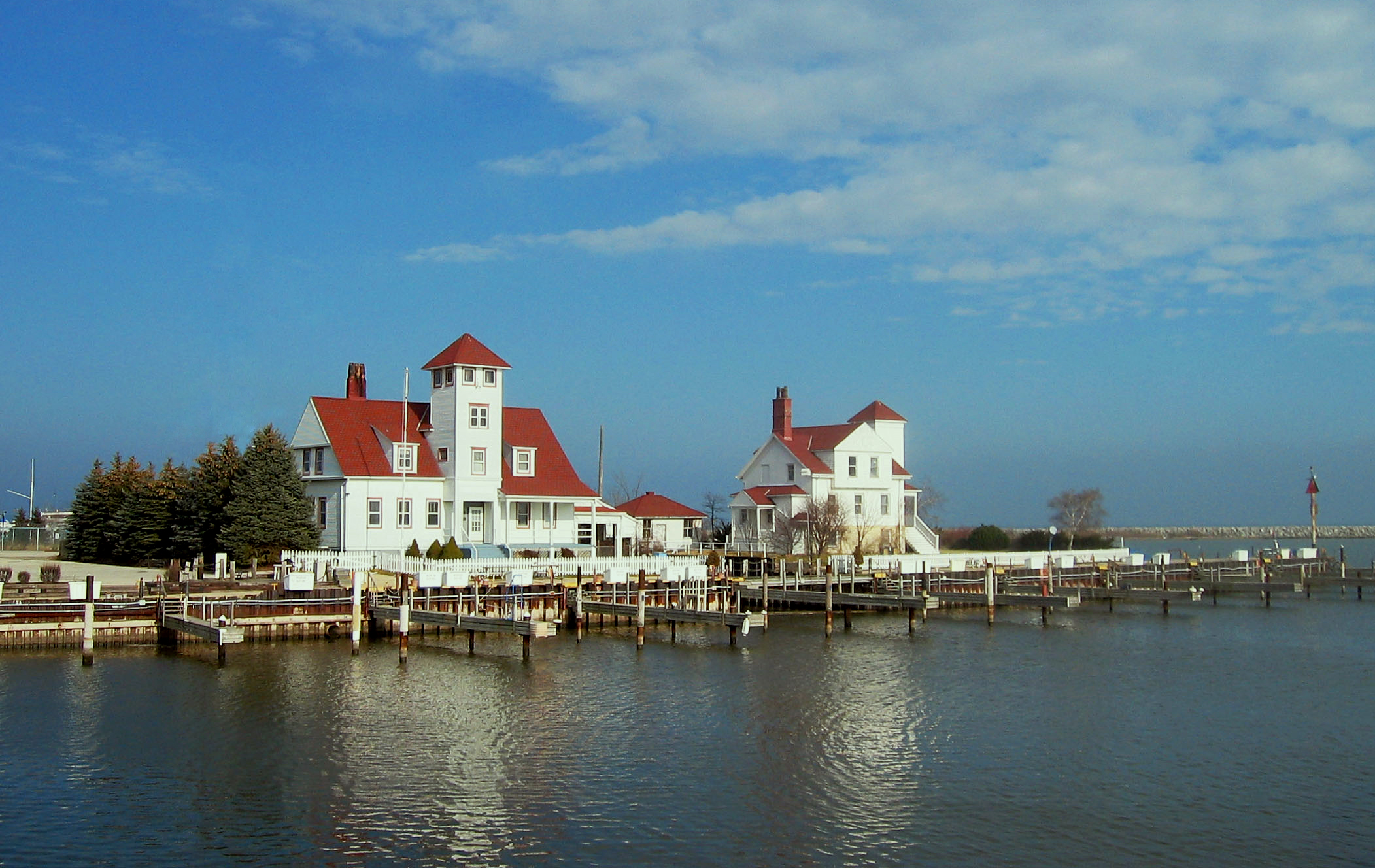
The mouth of the Root River

According to the United States Census Bureau, the city has a total area of 15.66 square miles (40.56 km^{2}), of which 15.47 square miles (40.07 km^{2}) is land and 0.18 square miles (0.47 km^{2}) is water.

=== Climate ===
Racine has a warm-summer Continental climate (Köppen climate classification: Dfb). Summers are warm and short while winters are cold. Precipitation is dispersed evenly throughout the year, although summers are slightly wetter and more humid than winters.

Climate data for Racine WWTP, Wisconsin (1991–2020 normals, extremes 1896–present)
Month	Jan	Feb	Mar	Apr	May	Jun	Jul	Aug	Sep	Oct	Nov	Dec	Year
Record high °F (°C)	64 (18)	67 (19)	83 (28)	92 (33)	96 (36)	106 (41)	107 (42)	104 (40)	102 (39)	91 (33)	79 (26)	66 (19)	107 (42)
Mean maximum °F (°C)	48.9 (9.4)	51.9 (11.1)	64.9 (18.3)	75.4 (24.1)	82.8 (28.2)	89.5 (31.9)	93.1 (33.9)	91.1 (32.8)	86.4 (30.2)	77.4 (25.2)	64.3 (17.9)	53.1 (11.7)	94.7 (34.8)
Mean daily maximum °F (°C)	29.6 (−1.3)	32.4 (0.2)	40.8 (4.9)	50.7 (10.4)	61.3 (16.3)	71.9 (22.2)	78.5 (25.8)	77.3 (25.2)	70.5 (21.4)	58.8 (14.9)	46.0 (7.8)	34.8 (1.6)	54.4 (12.4)
Daily mean °F (°C)	22.1 (−5.5)	25.1 (−3.8)	33.9 (1.1)	43.6 (6.4)	53.5 (11.9)	64.1 (17.8)	71.0 (21.7)	70.4 (21.3)	63.1 (17.3)	51.0 (10.6)	38.9 (3.8)	27.9 (−2.3)	47.0 (8.3)
Mean daily minimum °F (°C)	14.5 (−9.7)	17.9 (−7.8)	26.9 (−2.8)	36.4 (2.4)	45.6 (7.6)	56.3 (13.5)	63.5 (17.5)	63.4 (17.4)	55.7 (13.2)	43.1 (6.2)	31.7 (−0.2)	21.0 (−6.1)	39.7 (4.3)
Mean minimum °F (°C)	−5.2 (−20.7)	−0.3 (−17.9)	9.9 (−12.3)	26.0 (−3.3)	37.1 (2.8)	47.2 (8.4)	56.1 (13.4)	55.9 (13.3)	42.9 (6.1)	30.6 (−0.8)	17.5 (−8.1)	2.2 (−16.6)	−9.3 (−22.9)
Record low °F (°C)	−31 (−35)	−24 (−31)	−12 (−24)	10 (−12)	25 (−4)	33 (1)	42 (6)	40 (4)	28 (−2)	14 (−10)	−5 (−21)	−23 (−31)	−31 (−35)
Average precipitation inches (mm)	1.98 (50)	1.92 (49)	2.42 (61)	3.94 (100)	4.32 (110)	4.35 (110)	3.27 (83)	3.75 (95)	3.34 (85)	3.07 (78)	2.53 (64)	2.09 (53)	36.98 (939)
Average snowfall inches (cm)	13.3 (34)	10.9 (28)	5.5 (14)	1.0 (2.5)	0.0 (0.0)	0.0 (0.0)	0.0 (0.0)	0.0 (0.0)	0.0 (0.0)	0.0 (0.0)	1.9 (4.8)	8.4 (21)	41.0 (104)
Average precipitation days (≥ 0.01 in)	10.2	8.4	9.7	11.8	12.6	11.2	9.0	9.4	9.2	9.9	8.8	9.7	119.9
Average snowy days (≥ 0.1 in)	6.4	4.5	2.7	0.7	0.0	0.0	0.0	0.0	0.0	0.0	1.1	4.2	19.6
Source: NOAA

== Demographics ==
Historical population
Census	Pop.	Note	%±
1850	5,107		—
1860	7,822		53.2%
1870	9,880		26.3%
1880	16,031		62.3%
1890	21,014		31.1%
1900	29,102		38.5%
1910	38,002		30.6%
1920	58,593		54.2%
1930	67,542		15.3%
1940	67,195		−0.5%
1950	71,193		5.9%
1960	89,144		25.2%
1970	95,162		6.8%
1980	85,725		−9.9%
1990	84,298		−1.7%
2000	81,855		−2.9%
2010	78,860		−3.7%
2020	77,816		−1.3%
U.S. Decennial Census; 2020 census

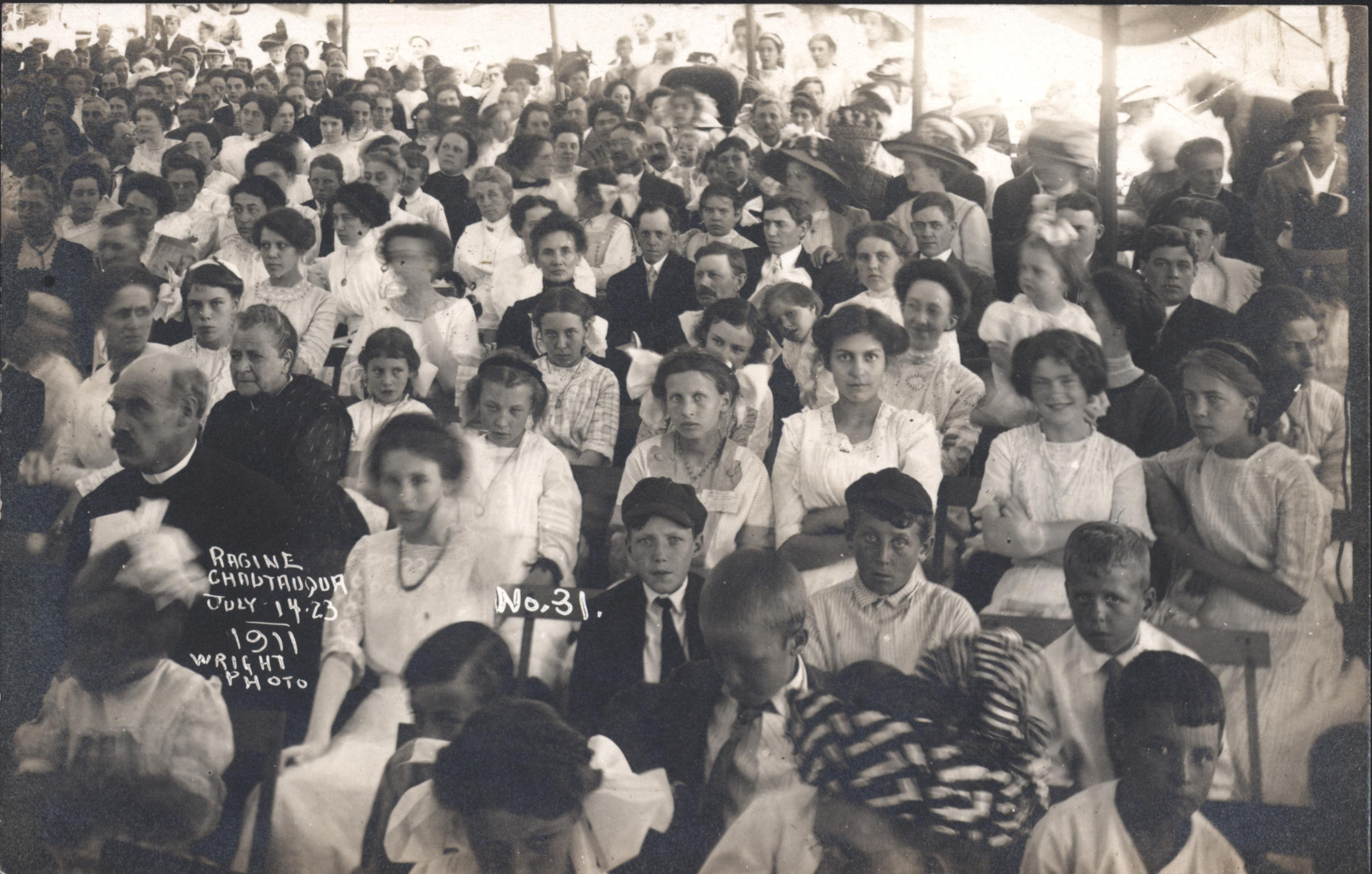
Racine, Wisconsin Chautauqua presentation under a tent, July 14–23, 1911. Photo by Wright Photo.

Waves of European immigrants, including Danes, Germans, and Czechs, began to settle in Racine between the Civil War and the First World War. African Americans started arriving in large numbers during World War I, as they did in other Midwestern industrial towns, and Hispanics migrated to Racine from roughly 1925 onward.

Unitarians, Episcopalians and Congregationalists from New England initially dominated Racine's religious life. Racine's Emmaus Lutheran Church, the oldest Danish Lutheran Church in North America, was founded on August 22, 1851. Originally a founding member of the Danish American Lutheran Church, it has subsequently been a member of the United Danish Evangelical Lutheran Church in America (UDELCA), the American Lutheran Church (ALC), and, since 1988, the Evangelical Lutheran Church in America (ELCA). There was also a large Catholic movement to the city, opening up churches for their own ethnicity, such as St. Stanislaus (Polish), St. Rose (Irish), Holy Name (German), St. Patrick (Irish), Sacred Heart (Italian), St. Joseph (German), St. Mary (German), Holy Trinity (Slovak), St. Casimir (Lithuanian), and others. As years passed, populations moved, and St. Stanislaus, Holy Name, Holy Trinity, St. Rose, and St. Casimir merged in 1998 to form St. Richard. With new waves of people arriving, older parishes received a boost from the Hispanic community, which formed Cristo Rey, re-energizing St. Patrick's into the strong Catholic community of today.

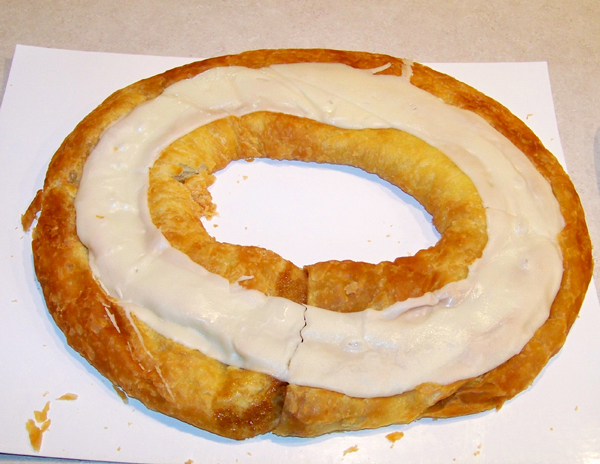
Kringle from Racine

Racine has the largest Danish population in North America. The city has become known for its Danish pastries, particularly kringle. Several local bakeries have been featured on the Food Network highlighting the pastry.

=== Racial and ethnic composition ===
Racine, Wisconsin – Racial and ethnic composition Note: the US Census treats Hispanic/Latino as an ethnic category. This table excludes Latinos from the racial categories and assigns them to a separate category. Hispanics/Latinos may be of any race.
Race / Ethnicity (NH = Non-Hispanic)	Pop 2000	Pop 2010	Pop 2020	% 2000	% 2010	2020
White alone (NH)	51,962	42,189	35,771	63.48%	53.50%	45.97%
Black or African American alone (NH)	16,349	17,341	18,003	19.97%	21.99%	23.14%
Native American or Alaska Native alone (NH)	229	279	200	0.28%	0.35%	0.26%
Asian alone (NH)	473	578	575	0.58%	0.73%	0.74%
Pacific Islander alone (NH)	30	17	14	0.04%	0.02%	0.02%
Other race alone (NH)	106	143	398	0.13%	0.18%	0.51%
Mixed race or Multiracial (NH)	1,284	2,004	3,999	1.57%	2.54%	5.14%
Hispanic or Latino (any race)	11,422	16,309	18,856	13.95%	20.68%	24.23%
Total	81,855	78,860	77,816	100.00%	100.00%	100.00%

=== 2020 census ===
As of the 2020 census, Racine had a population of 77,816. The population density was 5,028.5 inhabitants per square mile (1,941.5/km^{2}). There were 33,871 housing units at an average density of 2,188.8 per square mile (845.1/km^{2}).

The median age was 35.3 years. 26.5% of residents were under age 18, and 13.5% were age 65 or older. For every 100 females, there were 94.0 males; for every 100 females age 18 and over, there were 90.9 males.

There were 31,133 households, of which 32.3% had children under age 18. Of all households, 32.0% were married-couple households, 22.2% had a male householder with no spouse or partner present, and 35.8% had a female householder with no spouse or partner present. About 33.0% of households were individuals, and 11.4% had someone living alone who was age 65 or older.

Of the city's 33,871 housing units, 8.1% were vacant. The homeowner vacancy rate was 1.7%, and the rental vacancy rate was 7.6%.

As of the 2020 census, 100.0% of residents lived in urban areas and 0.0% lived in rural areas. Racial and ethnic composition for 2020 is shown in the table above.

=== 2016–2020 American Community Survey ===
According to the American Community Survey estimates for 2016–2020, the median household income in the city was $44,346, and the median income for a family was $54,161. Male full-time workers had a median income of $42,864 compared with $36,299 for female workers. The per capita income for the city was $22,837. About 15.7% of families and 20.7% of the population were below the poverty line, including 29.0% of those under age 18 and 9.1% of those age 65 or over. Of the population age 25 and over, 86.5% were high school graduates or higher and 17.2% had a bachelor's degree or higher.

=== 2010 census ===
As of the 2010 census, there were 78,860 people, 30,530 households, and 19,222 families residing in the city. The population density was 5,094.3 inhabitants per square mile (1,966.9/km^{2}). There were 33,887 housing units at an average density of 2,189.1 per square mile (845.2/km^{2}). The racial makeup of the city was 58.8% White, 22.6% African American, 0.5% Native American, 0.8% Asian, 10.3% from other races, and 4.0% from two or more races. Hispanic or Latino of any race were 20.7% of the population.

There were 30,530 households, of which 35.8% had children under the age of 18 living with them, 36.5% were married couples living together, 20.1% had a female householder with no husband present, 6.3% had a male householder with no wife present, and 37.0% were non-families. 30.5% of all households were made up of individuals, and 9.4% had someone living alone who was 65 years of age or older. The average household size was 2.53, and the average family size was 3.17.

The median age in the city was 33 years. 27.9% of residents were under the age of 18; 9.8% were between the ages of 18 and 24; 27.6% were from 25 to 44; 23.8% were from 45 to 64; and 10.9% were 65 years of age or older. The gender makeup of the city was 48.8% male and 51.2% female.

=== 2011–2015 estimates ===
- Veterans, 2011–2015: 4,861
- Median household income for Racine (in 2015 dollars), 2011–2015: $41,455
- Per capita income in past 12 months in Racine (in 2015 dollars), 2011–2015: $20,580
- Poverty rate in Racine: 21.6%

=== 2023 United States Census Bureau American Community Survey one-year estimates ===
Racial Makeup of Racine (2023): 1. White alone (54.2%); 2. Black alone (18.3%); 3. Native American alone (0.39%); 4. Asian alone (0.06%); 5. Pacific Islander alone (0.06%); 6. Some other race alone (8.04%); 7. Two or more races (18.9%)	Racial Makeup of Racine treating Hispanics as a Racial Category (2023); NH=Non-Hispanic: 1. White NH (48.1%); 2. Black NH (18.1%); 3. Native American NH (0.39%); 4. Asian NH (0.06%); 5. Pacific Islander NH (0.06%); 6. Other race NH (0.38%); 7. Two or more races NH (7.03%); 8. Hispanic Any Race (26.0%)	Racial Makeup of Hispanics in Racine (2023): 1. White alone (23.5%); 2. Black alone (1.11%); 3. Other race alone (29.5%); 4. Two or more races (45.9%)

=== Crime rates ===
Racine employs community-oriented policing, the systematic use of partnerships and problem-solving techniques to address the immediate conditions that give rise to crime. The number of crimes committed in the city in 2013 dropped in several categories to the lowest point in decades. Racine saw a 38.3 percent drop in violent crime from 2009 to 2013, making it the 10th largest decrease in the country. Property crimes were at their lowest level since 1965, while the number of violent crimes was the lowest for any year on record.

However, that trend has since changed. As of 2018, the chance of becoming a victim of either violent or property crime in Racine is 1 in 37, thus making the city's crime rate higher than 92% of Wisconsin's other cities and towns.

== Arts and culture ==
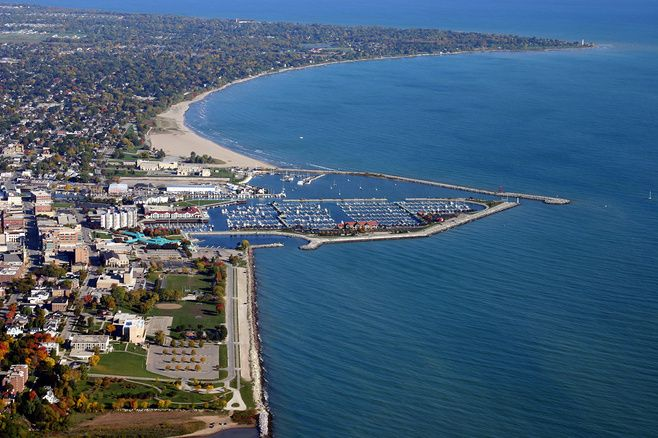
Downtown and marina

Racine is home to museums, theater companies, visual arts organizations, galleries, performance groups, music organizations, dance studios, concert series, and special art events.

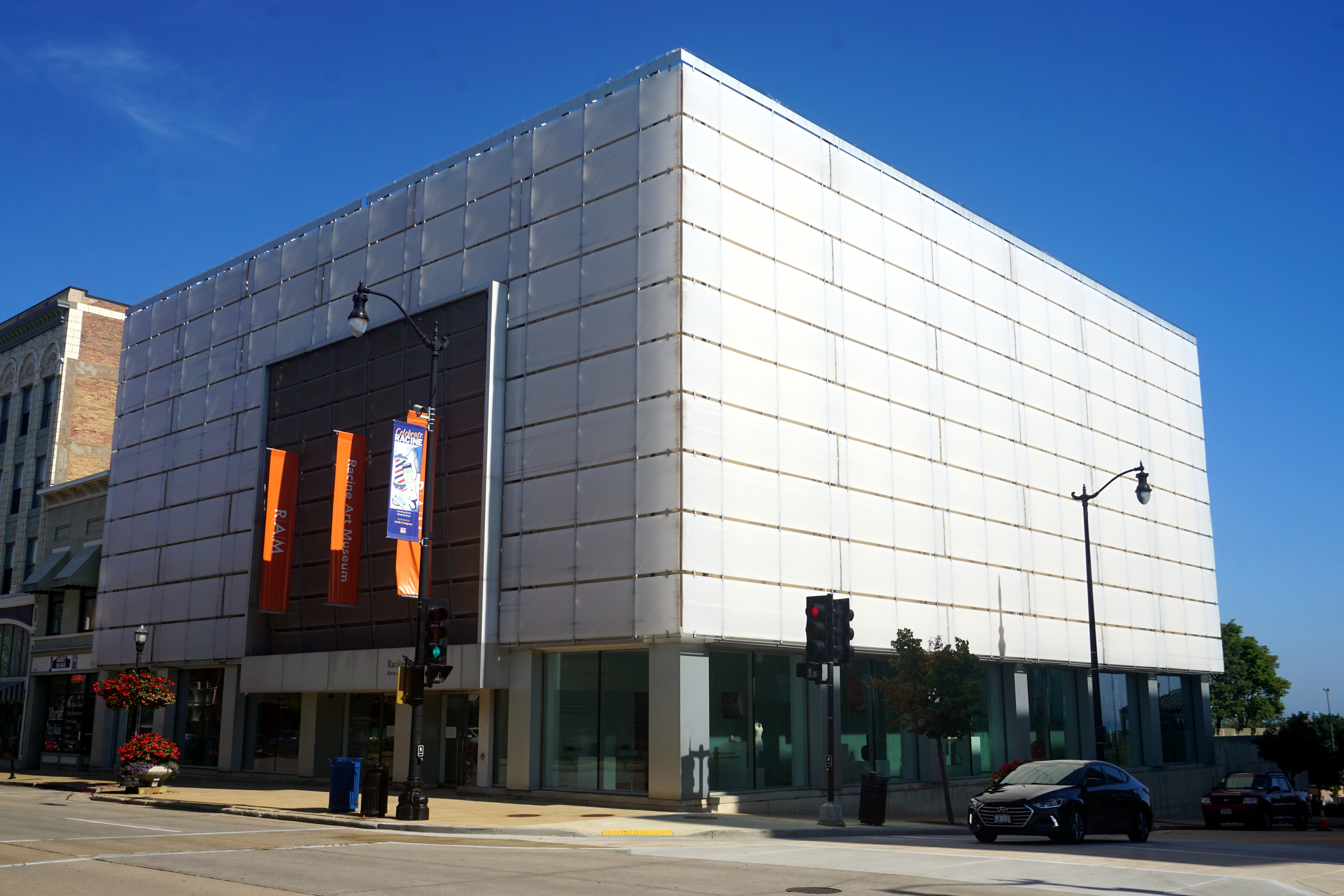
Racine Art Museum

The Racine Art Museum is home to the largest collection of contemporary craft in America, with over 4,000 pieces in art jewelry, ceramics, fibers, glass, metals, polymer, and wood, and over 4,000 works on paper and sculptures. RAM's satellite campus, Wustum Museum of Fine Arts, presents exhibitions of regional artists along with art classes and workshops. The Racine Arts Council's exhibitions feature local and regional artists. The annual 16th Street Studios Open House offers a look inside artists' workspaces at the Racine Arts and Business Center.

The Racine Theater Guild annually offers a season of seven to eight main-stage plays and musicals, as well as Racine Children's Theatre, Jean's Jazz Series, and Comedy Tonight. Every winter, Over Our Head Players at 6th Street Theatre hosts Snowdance, a playwriting contest in which audience members determine the winning plays. Entries for the contest come from all over the world.

The Racine Symphony Orchestra performs 2-3 Masterworks concerts per year, several free pops concerts, and an annual concert for fifth graders. Local bands perform free noontime and evening concerts at downtown's centrally located Monument Square throughout the summer. Weekly open mic opportunities for musicians and other performers are hosted by Family Power Music.

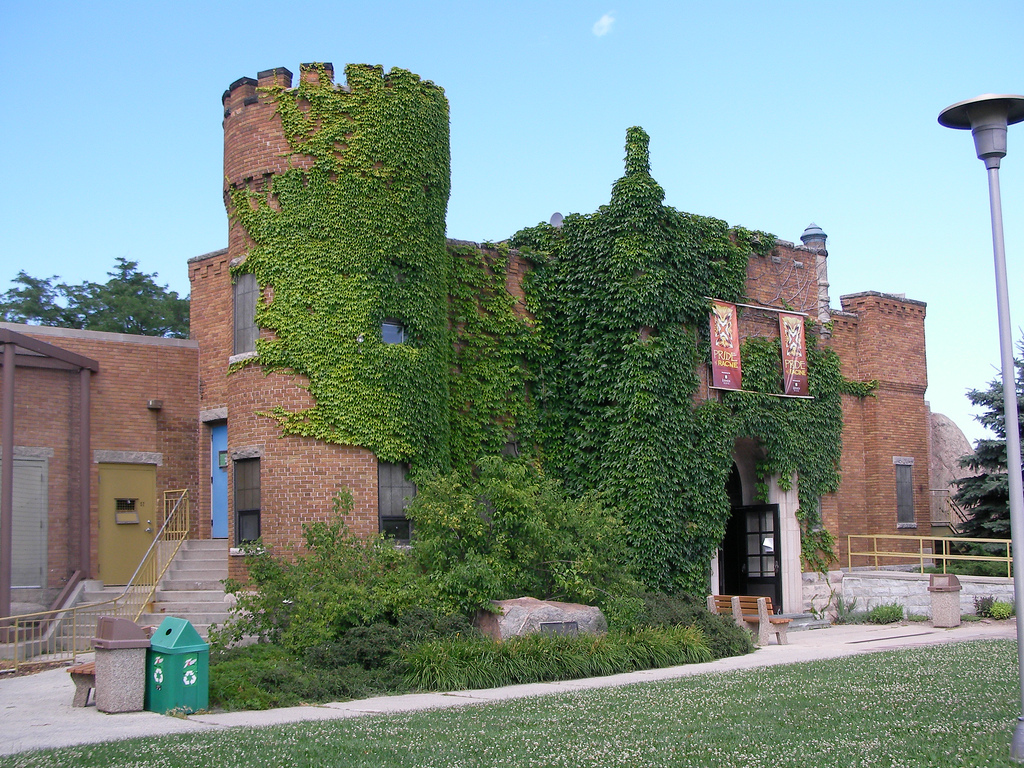
Primate building at the Racine Zoo

The monthly BONK! Performance Series showcases local, regional and national poets.

There are four opportunities for area artists and poets to receive recognition for their work: The RAM Artist Fellowship Program awards four $3,000 Artist Fellowships and one $1,500 Emerging Artist Award every two years with recipients given solo exhibits; The Racine Arts Council ArtSeed Program provides grants ranging from $500 to $1,500 to projects that are new, innovative, experimental and collaborative; the Racine Writer in Residence Program awards two 6-month residencies each year with a stipend of $1,500; the Racine/Kenosha Poet Laureate Program chooses one poet from Racine and one poet from Kenosha every 2 years.

=== Architecture ===
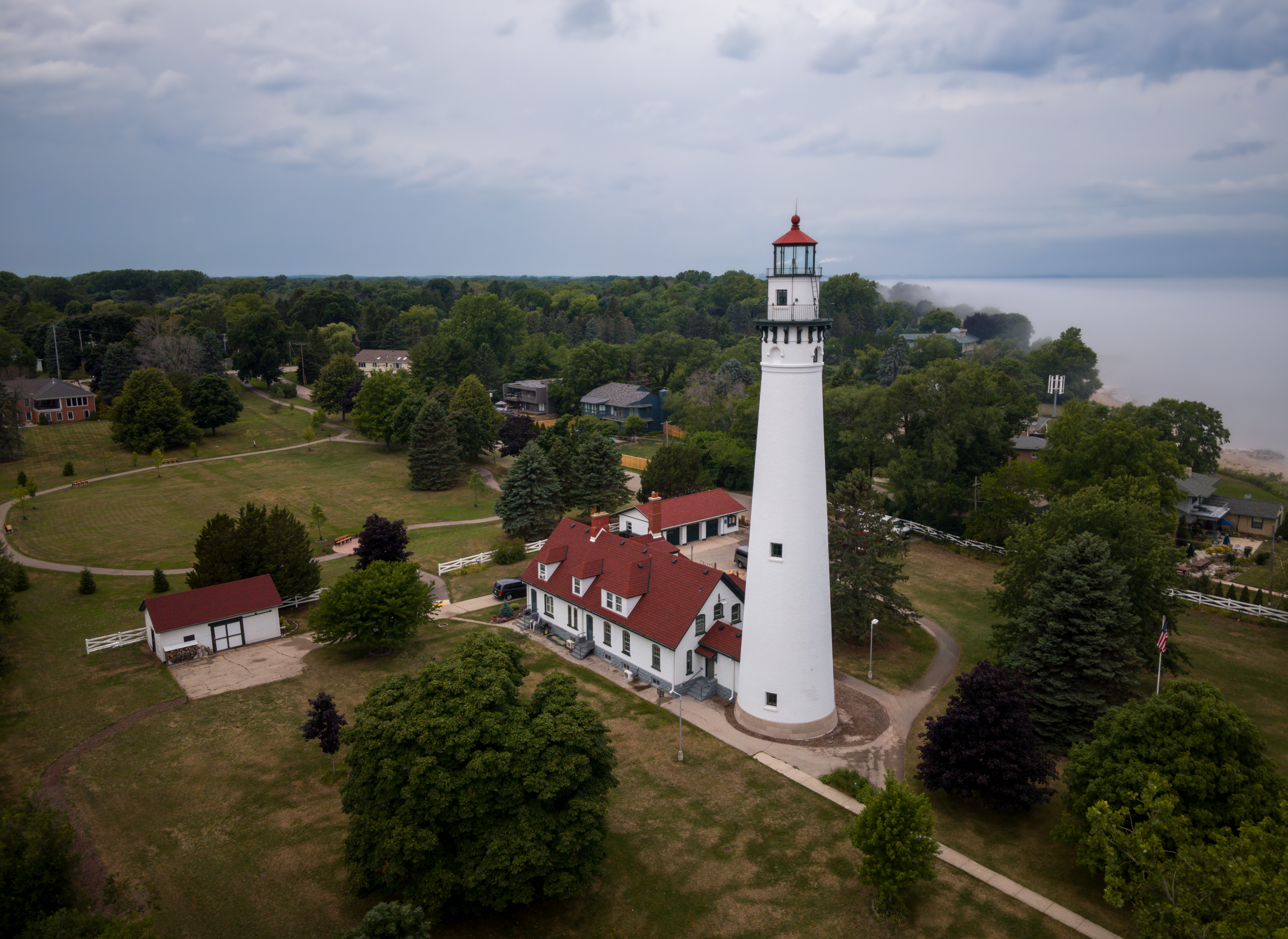
Wind Point Lighthouse

Racine has several examples of Frank Lloyd Wright's work, including the Johnson Wax Headquarters, Wingspread, the Thomas P. Hardy House, and the Keland House. S.C. Johnson offers free tours of its corporate campus and receives about 9,000 visitors per year. The Research Tower, which is located on the SC Johnson campus, is one of only 2 existing high rise buildings designed by Frank Lloyd Wright. Fortaleza Hall, designed by Norman Foster, houses the "SC Johnson Gallery: Frank Lloyd Wright At Home" and a Frank Lloyd Wright library. The Johnson Wax disc-shaped Golden Rondelle Theater was originally constructed as the Johnson Wax pavilion for the 1964 New York World's Fair and then relocated to Racine.

The Racine Art Museum, designed by the Chicago architecture firm Brininstool + Lynch, is a modern reuse of an existing structure to house RAM's permanent collection of contemporary craft. The building has an exterior façade of translucent acrylic panels that are illuminated at night, making the museum glow in the dark like a Japanese lantern.

The OS House, a private residence designed by the Milwaukee architecture firm Johnsen Schmaling Architects, was recognized in 2011 as one of the top 10 residential projects in the United States by the American Institute of Architects. The LEED Platinum-certified home was also named in 2011 as one of the top 10 green projects in the country by the AIA, and in 2012 as one of 11 national winners in the Small Projects category. The OS House has been featured in the New York Times. The house, an example of 21st-century modern architecture, is located on the shore of Lake Michigan in Racine's Southside Historic District.

==== Buildings on the National Register of Historic Places ====
- Hansen House
- Memorial Hall
- St. Luke's Episcopal Church, Chapel, Guildhall, and Rectory
- St. Patrick's Roman Catholic Church
- Wind Point Lighthouse
- YMCA Building
- Racine Elks Club, Lodge No. 252 (Racine, Wisconsin)
- McClurg Building (Main Place)
- Racine Depot

=== Prom ===
The city is known for its large prom celebration, at which students from all the high schools in the city participate in an after-prom party. This was featured on the radio show This American Life in Episode #186 "Prom", which originally aired on June 8, 2001; Racine's prom tradition was also the subject of the 2006 documentary The World's Best Prom. In addition to the large prom Racine is known for, the city has also hosted a special-needs prom, A Night To Remember every year since 2013. The A Night To Remember prom always takes place on the Sunday following Racine's larger prom and includes those from age 13 to 30.

== Government ==
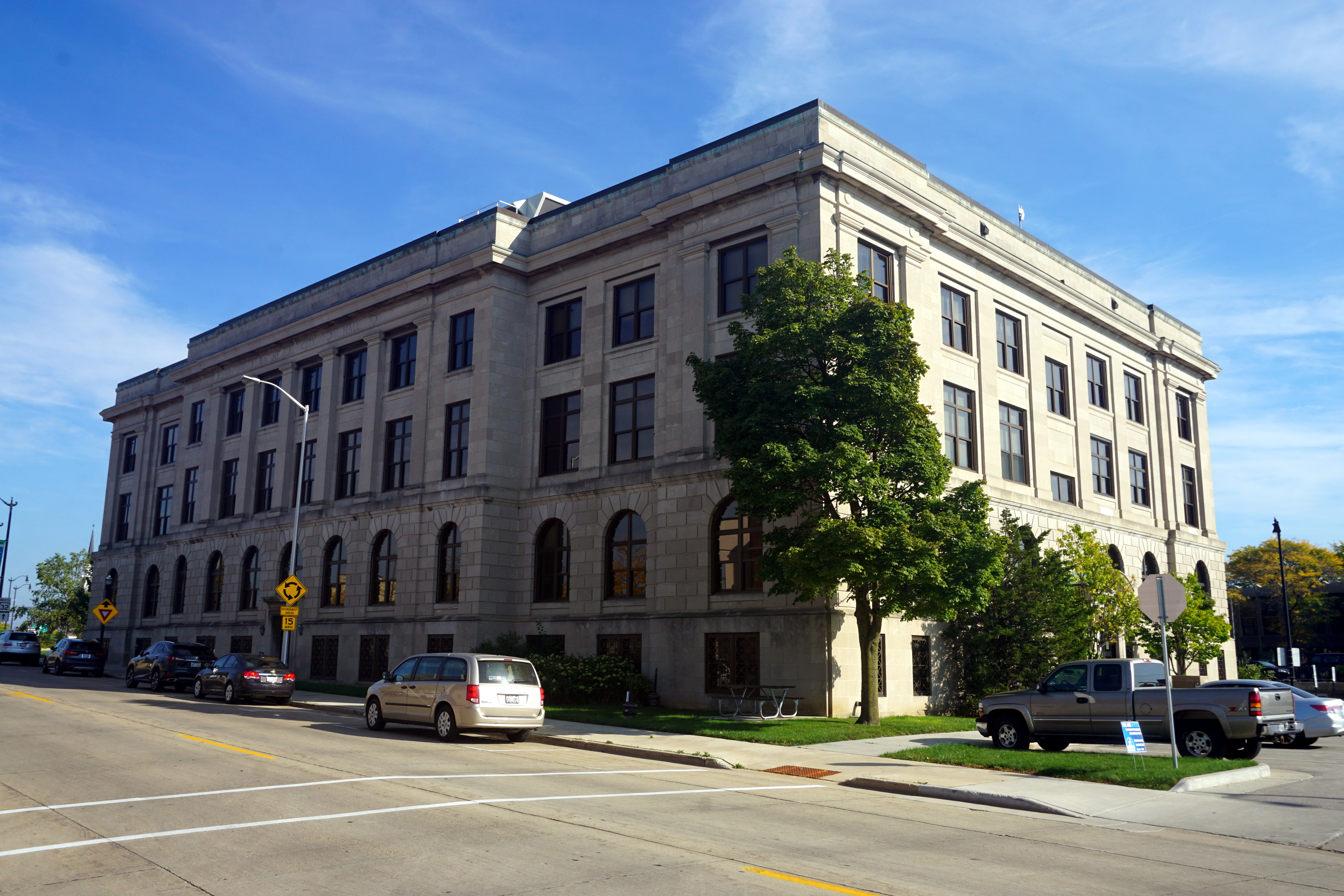
Racine City Hall

Racine has a mayor-council form of government. The mayor is the chief executive, elected for a four-year-term. The mayor appoints commissioners and other officials who oversee the departments, subject to Common Council approval. The current mayor is Cory Mason (D); he is the 58th mayor of Racine, currently serving his second full four-year term after taking office in a special election in October 2017.

Racine's other citywide elected official is the Municipal Judge. The city council is made up of 15 aldermen, one elected from each aldermanic district in the city. The council enacts local ordinances and approves the city budget. Government priorities and activities are established in a budget ordinance, usually adopted each November. Being a diverse community with a history of organized labor, the city predominantly votes for the Democratic Party. The city's youngest city council president was Tom Mortenson, 28, who was a leading Progressive Republican who led ethical reform that served as a model for other municipal governments.

For federal representation, Racine is part of Wisconsin's 1st congressional district, represented by Bryan Steil (R). Wisconsin's two U.S. senators are Ron Johnson (R) and Tammy Baldwin (D).

In Wisconsin's lower state legislative chamber, the Wisconsin State Assembly, Racine is split between the 62nd Assembly district in the north, represented by Robert Wittke (R), and the 66th Assembly district in the south, represented by Greta Neubauer (D). In Wisconsin's upper chamber, the Wisconsin Senate, the area represented by the 66th Assembly district falls within Wisconsin's 22nd Senate district, represented by Robert Wirch (D). The area represented by the 62nd Assembly district falls within the 21st Senate district, represented by Van H. Wanggaard (R).

=== Public safety ===
Fire protection and ambulance service are provided by the Racine Fire Department with six fire stations. Law enforcement services are provided by the Racine Police Department.

== Education ==
=== Public schools ===
Racine's public schools are administered by the Racine Unified School District, which oversees one early education center, seven elementary schools, eight K-8 schools, two 6-12 schools, three high schools, and one alternative education center with a combined student enrollment of around 16,000. Programs such as International Baccalaureate and Montessori are utilized in the District.

=== Private schools ===
Private schools in the city include:

- Racine Lutheran High School
- St. Catherine's High School

The Prairie School is in nearby Wind Point. It was co-founded by Imogene "Gene" Powers Johnson.

=== Higher education ===
University of Wisconsin–Parkside is located south of Racine in the Town of Somers. Prior to Parkside's creation, there were state college campuses in both Racine and Kenosha, but given their proximity, it was decided that they would be better served by one larger campus between the two cities. A campus of Gateway Technical College, which serves the tri-county area of the southeastern corner of Wisconsin, is located in the downtown district on Lake Michigan.

== Sports ==
The Racine Legion, a professional football team in the National Football League, played here from 1922 to 1924. Its official name was the Horlick-Racine Legion. The team then operated as the Racine Tornadoes in 1926. They played at Horlick Field.

== Media ==
Racine is served by the daily newspaper The Journal Times, which is the namesake (but not current owner) of radio station WRJN (1400), and is owned by Lee Enterprises. The Milwaukee Journal Sentinel formerly published a Racine-specific page on Thursdays and a Racine County section on Sundays, but dropped them in 2007. The Insider News covers issues specific to the city's Black community. The Racine County Eye also covers Racine County news. Happenings Magazine covers local entertainment events in Racine.

The city has one television station owned by Weigel Broadcasting, WMLW-TV (Channel 49), an independent station which airs syndicated content, and had its analog transmitter just north of the Milwaukee County line in Oak Creek. For all intents and purposes, the station serves all of southeastern Wisconsin, with its offices in West Allis, and its current transmitter is located on the Weigel tower in Milwaukee's Lincoln Park. WDJT-TV (its sister CBS station) continues to produce a weekend public affairs program called Racine & Me which is devoted to topics of interest to Racine residents.

FM radio stations serving the area are country music WVTY (92.1 FM) and urban contemporary WKKV-FM (100.7). WVTY specifically targets Racine and Kenosha and is locally owned (though with some competition with market leader WMIL-FM), while WKKV is a station owned by iHeartMedia that, although licensed to Racine and having a transmitter in north-central Racine County, is targeted towards Milwaukee audiences and has its offices in Greenfield. Sturtevant-licensed WDDW-FM (104.7) broadcasts a traditional Mexican music format targeting the metro area's Mexican-American population. WGTD (91.1 FM) is operated by Gateway Technical College in Kenosha. While licensed to the city of Kenosha, the station provides news coverage to the cities of Kenosha and Racine.

== Infrastructure ==
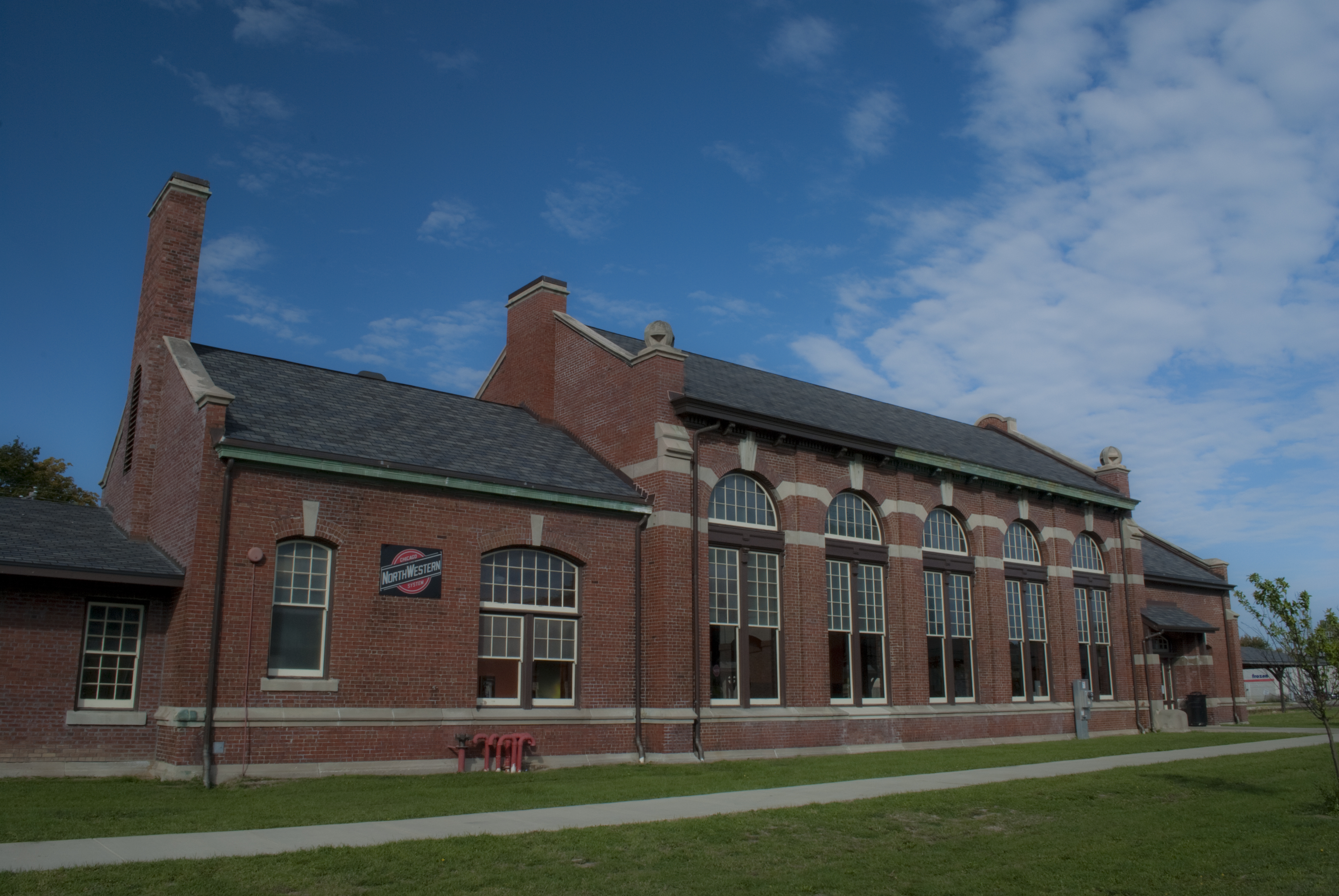
The Racine Depot was located along the Chicago and North Western Railway

=== Water ===
Racine's municipal water is drawn from Lake Michigan. In 2011, the city's water was named the best-tasting tap water in the United States by a panel of the U.S. Conference of Mayors.

=== Transportation ===
Mass transit is provided by the Belle Urban System or "BUS" for short. Taxi service is provided by Racine Taxi.

Racine is also served by Amtrak's Hiawatha from the Sturtevant station in Racine County. Additional train service to Chicago is provided by Metra's Union Pacific North Line from the downtown Kenosha station, which is located 6 miles from the Racine County line and 11 miles from downtown Racine. Up until 1971, residents could catch a train in downtown Racine at the Racine Depot. Today, the equivalent route between the Kenosha and Milwaukee train stations is covered by a bus route co-provided by Racine's public transit system and Wisconsin Coach Lines.

Racine has several bridges connecting various parts of the city across the Root River, such as the Main Street Bridge and the West 6th Street Bridge.

=== Airport ===
Batten International Airport (KRAC) is a public-use airport located in Racine, and the largest privately owned airport in the United States. Racine is one of only three Wisconsin cities, along with Milwaukee and Green Bay, to have airports with customs intake capabilities. Commercial air service is provided by O'Hare International Airport and General Mitchell International Airport.

== Sister cities ==
Racine's sister cities are:

- Aalborg, Region Nordjylland, Denmark
- Montélimar, Auvergne-Rhône-Alpes, France
- Ōiso, Kanagawa, Japan
- Zapotlanejo, Jalisco, Mexico
- Fortaleza, Ceará, Brazil

== See also ==
- O&H Danish Bakery
